= Gunpowder Plot =

1605 failed attempt to kill King James I of England

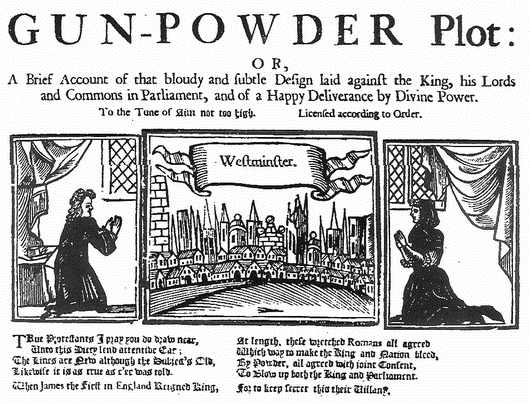
- A late 17th- or early 18th-century report of the plot
- Date: 5 November 1605
- Location: London, England
- Type: Bombing, terrorism
- Participants: Robert Catesby, John and Christopher Wright, Robert and Thomas Wintour, Thomas Percy, Guy Fawkes, Robert Keyes, Thomas Bates, John Grant, Ambrose Rookwood, Sir Everard Digby and Francis Tresham
- Outcome: Failure, plotters executed (some posthumously).

The Gunpowder Plot of 1605, in earlier centuries often called the Gunpowder Treason Plot or the Jesuit Treason, was an unsuccessful attempted regicide against King James VI of Scotland and I of England by a group of English Catholics, led by Robert Catesby.

The plan was to blow up the House of Lords during the State Opening of Parliament on Tuesday 5 November 1605, (Note: Dates are given according to the Julian calendar, which was used in England and Wales until 1752.) as the prelude to a popular revolt in the Midlands during which King James's nine-year-old daughter, Princess Elizabeth, was to be installed as the new head of state. Catesby is suspected by historians to have embarked on the scheme after hopes of greater religious tolerance under James had faded, leaving many English Catholics disappointed. His fellow conspirators were John and Christopher Wright, Robert and Thomas Wintour, Thomas Percy, Guy Fawkes, Robert Keyes, Thomas Bates, John Grant, Ambrose Rookwood, Sir Everard Digby and Francis Tresham. Fawkes, who had 10 years of military experience fighting in the Spanish Netherlands in the failed suppression of the Dutch Revolt, was given charge of the explosives.

On 26 October 1605, an anonymous letter of warning was sent to William Parker, 4th Baron Monteagle, a Catholic member of Parliament, who immediately showed it to the authorities. During a search of the House of Lords on the evening of 4 November, Fawkes was discovered guarding 36 barrels of gunpowder—enough to reduce the House of Lords to rubble—and arrested. Hearing that the plot had been discovered, most of the conspirators fled from London while trying to enlist support along the way. Several made a last stand against the pursuing Sheriff of Worcestershire and a posse of his men at Holbeche House; in the ensuing gunfight Catesby was one of those shot and killed. At their trial on 27 January 1606, eight of the surviving conspirators, including Fawkes, were convicted and sentenced to be hanged, drawn and quartered.

Some details of the assassination attempt were allegedly known by the principal Jesuit of England, Henry Garnet. Although Garnet was convicted of high treason and put to death, doubt has been cast on how much he really knew. As the plot's existence was revealed to him through confession, Garnet was prevented from informing the authorities by the absolute confidentiality of the confessional. Although anti-Catholic legislation was introduced soon after the discovery of the plot, many important and loyal Catholics remained in high office during the rest of King James I's reign. The thwarting of the Gunpowder Plot was commemorated for many years afterwards by special sermons and other public events such as the ringing of church bells, which evolved into the British variant of Bonfire Night of today.

== Background ==
=== Religion in England ===
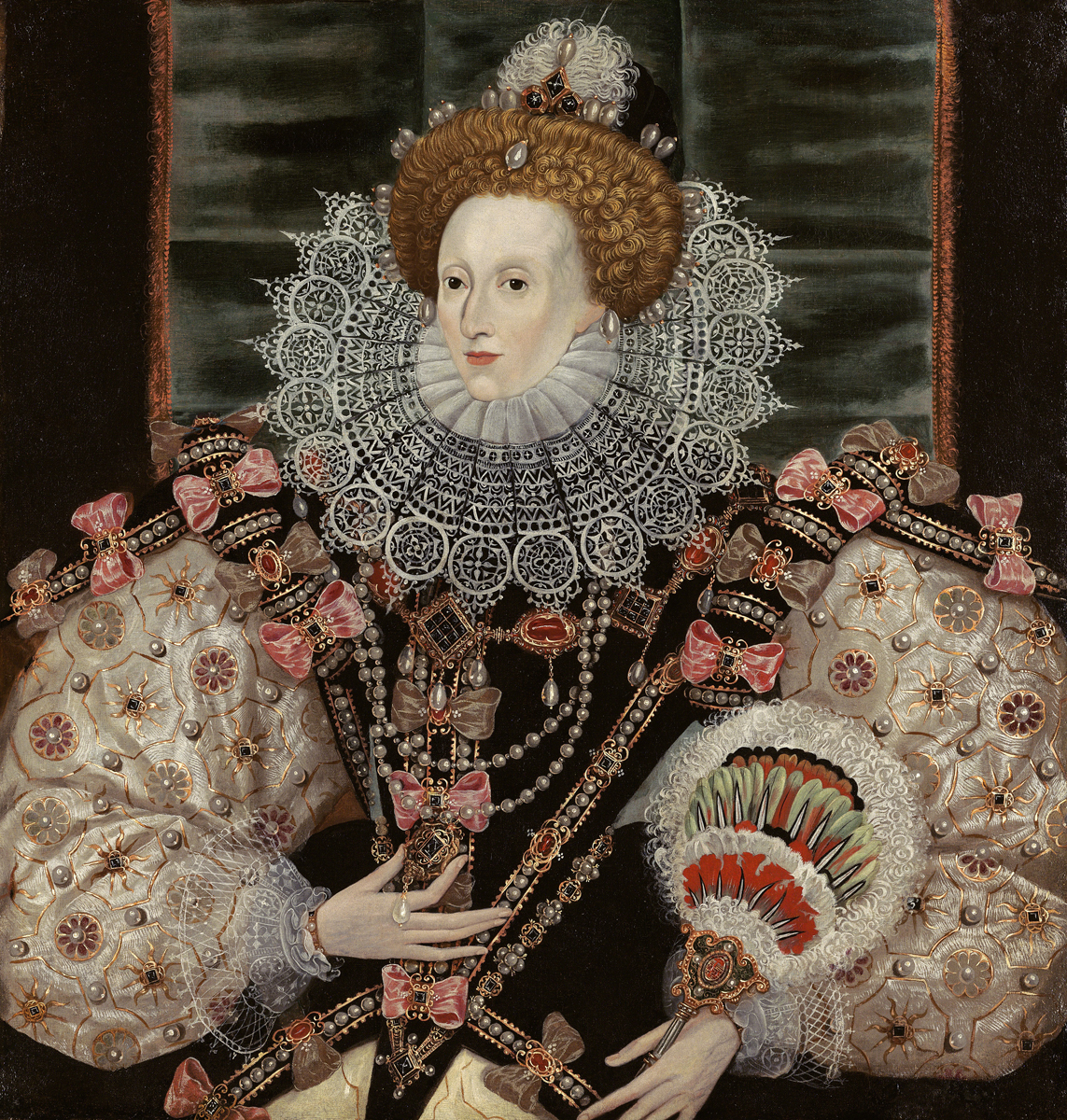
Elizabeth I, queen from 1558 to 1603

Between 1532 and 1540, King Henry VIII took control of the English Church from Rome, the start of several decades of religious tension in England. English Catholics struggled in a society dominated by the newly separate and increasingly Protestant Church of England. Henry's daughter, Queen Elizabeth I, responded to the growing religious divide by introducing the Elizabethan Religious Settlement, which required anyone appointed to a public or church office to swear allegiance to the monarch as head of the Church and state. The penalties for refusal were severe; fines were imposed for recusancy, and repeat offenders risked imprisonment and execution. Catholicism became marginalised and its adherence shrank to remote areas that were far from London. Despite the threat of torture or execution, priests continued to practise their faith in secret.

=== Succession ===
Queen Elizabeth, unmarried and childless, steadfastly refused to name an heir. Many Catholics believed that her Catholic cousin, Mary, Queen of Scots, was the legitimate heir to the English throne, but she was executed for treason in 1587. The English Secretary of State, Robert Cecil, negotiated secretly with Mary's son and successor, King James VI of Scotland. In the months before Elizabeth's death on 24 March 1603, Cecil prepared the way for James to succeed her.

Some exiled Catholics favoured Philip II of Spain's daughter, Isabella, as Elizabeth's successor. More moderate Catholics looked to James's and Elizabeth's cousin Lady Arbella Stuart, a woman thought to have Catholic sympathies. As Elizabeth's health deteriorated, the government detained those they considered to be the "principal papists", and the Privy Council grew so worried that Arbella Stuart was moved closer to London to prevent her from being kidnapped by papists.

Despite competing claims to the English throne, the transition of power following Elizabeth's death went smoothly. (Note: The heir presumptive under the terms of Henry VIII's will, i.e. either Edward Seymour, Viscount Beauchamp, or Anne Stanley, Countess of Castlehaven, depending on whether one recognised the legitimacy of the first-mentioned's birth; and the Lady Arbella Stuart on grounds similar to James's own.) James's succession was announced by a proclamation from Cecil on 24 March, which was generally celebrated. Leading papists, rather than causing trouble as anticipated, reacted to the news by offering their enthusiastic support for the new monarch. Jesuit priests, whose presence in England was punishable by death, also demonstrated their support for James, who was widely believed to embody "the natural order of things". James ordered a ceasefire in the conflict with Spain, and even though the two countries were still technically at war, King Philip III sent his envoy, Don Juan de Tassis, to congratulate James on his accession.

For decades, the English had lived under a monarch who refused to provide an heir, but James arrived with a family and a clear line of succession. His wife, Anne of Denmark, was the daughter of King Frederick II of Denmark. Their eldest child, the nine-year-old Henry, was considered a handsome and confident boy, and their two younger children, Elizabeth and Charles, were proof that James was able to provide heirs to continue the Protestant monarchy.

=== Early reign of James I ===
James's attitude towards Catholics was more moderate than that of his predecessor, perhaps even tolerant. He swore that he would not "persecute any that will be quiet and give an outward obedience to the law", and believed that exile was a better solution than capital punishment: "I would be glad to have both their heads and their bodies separated from this whole island and transported beyond seas." Some Catholics believed that the martyrdom of James's mother, Mary, Queen of Scots, would encourage James to convert to the Catholic faith, and the Catholic houses of Europe may also have shared that hope.

James received an envoy from Albert of Habsburg, ruler of the remaining Catholic territories in the Netherlands after over 30 years of war in the Dutch Revolt by English-supported Protestant rebels. For the Catholic expatriates engaged in that struggle, the restoration by force of a Catholic monarchy was an intriguing possibility, but following the failed Spanish invasion of England in 1588 the papacy had taken a longer-term view on the return of a Catholic monarch to the English throne.

During James I's reign the European wars of religion were intensifying. Protestants and Catholics were engaged in violent persecution of each other across Europe following the Protestant Reformation. Catholics made several assassination attempts on Protestant rulers in Europe and in England, including plans to poison James I's predecessor, Elizabeth I. In 1589, during the French Wars of Religion, the French King Henri III was mortally wounded with a dagger by Jacques Clément, a fanatic member of the Catholic League of France. Nine years later, the Jesuit Juan de Mariana's 1599 On Kings and the Education of Kings (De rege et regis institutione) argued in support of tyrannicide. This work recounted the assassination of Henry III and argued for the legal right to overthrow a tyrant. Perhaps due in part to the publication of De rege, until the 1620s, some English Catholics believed that regicide was justifiable to remove 'tyrants' from power. Much of the "rather nervous" political writing from James I was "concerned with the threat of Catholic assassination and refutation of the [Catholic] argument that 'faith did not need to be kept with heretics'".

=== Early plots ===
In the absence of any sign that James would move to end the persecution of Catholics, as some had hoped for, several members of the clergy (including two anti-Jesuit priests) decided to take matters into their own hands. In what became known as the Bye Plot, the priests William Watson and William Clark planned to kidnap James and hold him in the Tower of London until he agreed to be more tolerant towards Catholics. Cecil received news of the plot from several sources, including the Archpriest George Blackwell, who instructed his priests to have no part in any such schemes. At about the same time, Lord Cobham, Lord Grey de Wilton, Griffin Markham and Walter Raleigh hatched what became known as the Main Plot, which involved removing James and his family and supplanting them with Arbella Stuart, James' first cousin. Amongst others, they approached Philip III of Spain for funding, but were unsuccessful. All those involved in both plots were arrested in July and tried in autumn 1603. George Brooke was executed, but James—keen not to have too bloody a start to his reign—reprieved Cobham, Grey, and Markham while they were at the scaffold. Raleigh, who had watched while his colleagues sweated, had been due to be executed a few days later, but was also pardoned. Arbella Stuart denied any knowledge of the Main Plot. However, the two priests, Watson and Clark—condemned and "very bloodily handled"—were executed.

The Catholic community responded to news of these plots with shock. The Bye Plot revealed by Catholics was instrumental in saving them from further persecution, and James was grateful enough to allow pardons for those recusants who sued for them, as well as postponing payment of their fines for a year.

On 19 February 1604, shortly after he discovered that his wife, Queen Anne, had been sent a rosary from Pope Clement VIII via one of James's spies, (Note: Historians are divided on when and if Anne converted to Catholicism. "Some time in the 1590s, Anne became a Roman Catholic." "Some time after 1600, but well before March 1603, Queen Anne was received into the Catholic Church in a secret chamber in the royal palace". "... Sir John Lindsay went to Rome in November 1604 and had an audience with the pope at which he revealed that the queen was already a Catholic". "Catholic foreign ambassadors—who would surely have welcomed such a situation—were certain that the Queen was beyond their reach. 'She is a Lutheran', concluded the Venetian envoy Nicolo Molin in 1606." "In 1602 a report appeared, claiming that Anne ... had converted to the Catholic faith some years before. The author, the Scottish Jesuit Robert Abercromby, testified that James had received his wife's desertion with equanimity, commenting, 'Well, wife, if you cannot live without this sort of thing, do your best to keep things as quiet as possible'. Anne would, indeed, keep her religious beliefs as quiet as possible: for the remainder of her life—even after her death—they remained obfuscated.") Sir Anthony Standen, James denounced the Catholic Church. Three days later, he ordered all Jesuits and all other Catholic priests to leave the country, and reimposed the collection of fines for recusancy.

James changed his focus from the anxieties of English Catholics to the establishment of an Anglo-Scottish union. He also appointed Scottish nobles such as George Home to his court, which proved unpopular with the Parliament of England. Some Members of Parliament made it clear that, in their view, the "effluxion of people from the Northern parts" was unwelcome, and compared them to "plants which are transported from barren ground into a more fertile one". Even more discontent resulted when the King allowed his Scottish nobles to collect the recusancy fines. There were 5,560 convicted of recusancy in 1605, of whom 112 were landowners. The very few Catholics of great wealth who refused to attend services at their parish church were fined £20 per month. Those of more moderate means had to pay two-thirds of their annual rental income; middle class recusants were fined one shilling a week, although the collection of all these fines was "haphazard and negligent". When James came to power, almost £5,000 a year (equivalent to almost £12 million in 2020) was being raised by these fines. (Note: Comparing relative purchasing power of £5,000 in 1605 with 2008.)

On 19 March, the King gave his opening speech to his first English Parliament in which he spoke of his desire to secure peace, but only by "profession of the true religion". He also spoke of a Christian union and reiterated his desire to avoid religious persecution. For the Catholics, the King's speech made it clear that they were not to "increase their number and strength in this Kingdom", that "they might be in hope to erect their Religion again". To John Gerard, these words were almost certainly responsible for the heightened levels of persecution the members of his faith now suffered, and for the priest Oswald Tesimond, they were a repudiation of the early claims that the King had made, upon which the papists had built their hopes. A week after James's speech, Edmund, Lord Sheffield, informed the king of over 900 recusants brought before the Assizes in Normanby, and on 24 April, the Popish Recusants Act 1605 was introduced in Parliament which threatened to outlaw all English followers of the Catholic Church.

== Plot ==
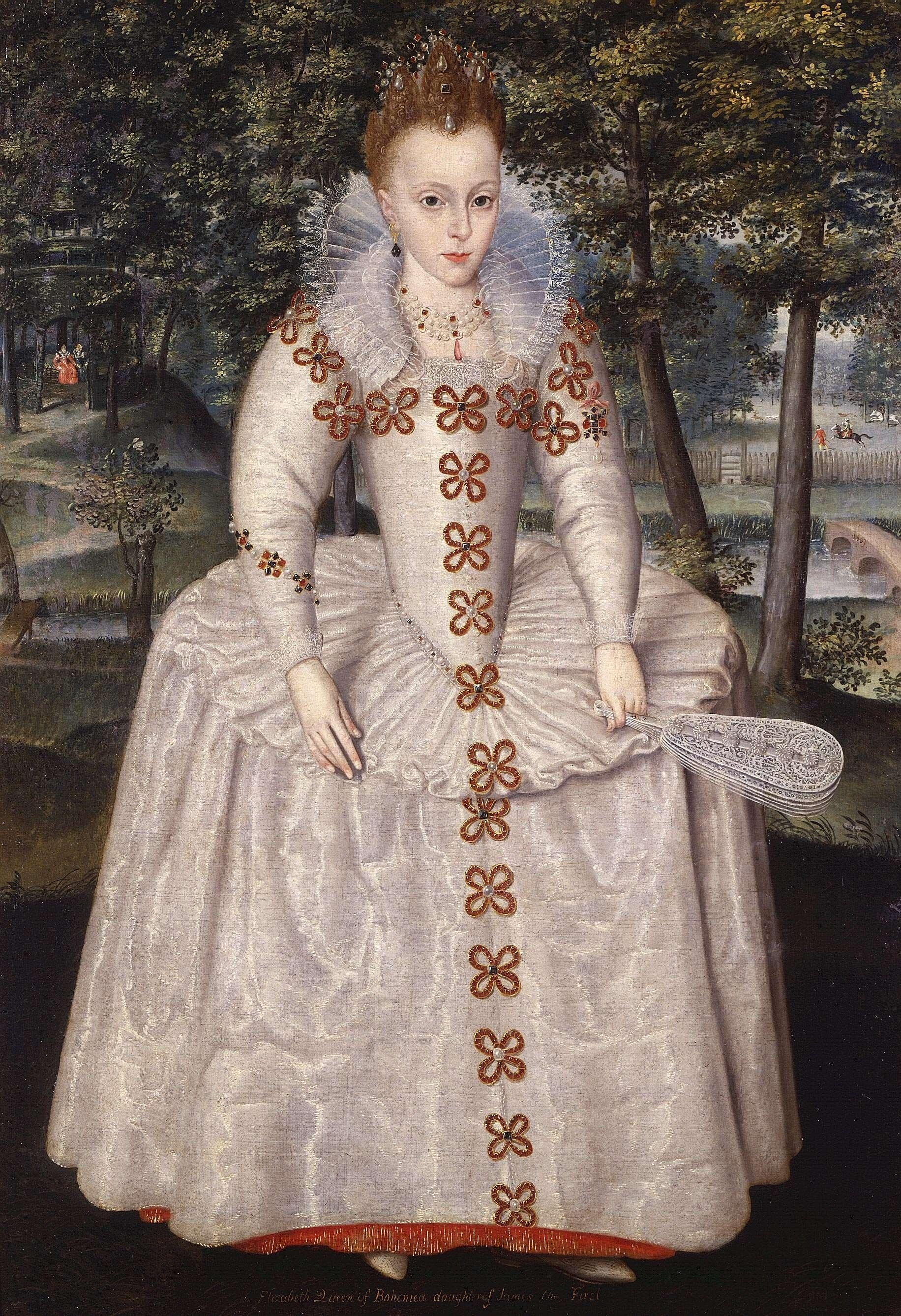
King James's daughter Elizabeth, whom the conspirators planned to install on the throne as a Catholic queen; portrait by Robert Peake the Elder, National Maritime Museum

The conspirators' principal aim was to kill King James, but many other important targets would also be present at the State Opening of Parliament, including the monarch's nearest relatives and members of the Privy Council. The senior judges of the English legal system, most of the Protestant aristocracy, and the bishops of the Church of England would all have attended in their capacity as members of the House of Lords, along with the members of the House of Commons. Another important objective was the kidnapping of the King's daughter, Elizabeth. Housed at Coombe Abbey near Coventry, she lived only ten miles north of Warwick—convenient for the plotters, most of whom lived in the Midlands. Once the King and his Parliament were dead, the plotters intended to install Elizabeth on the English throne as a titular queen. The fate of her brothers, Henry and Charles, would be improvised; their role in state ceremonies was, as yet, uncertain. The plotters planned to use Henry Percy, 9th Earl of Northumberland, as Elizabeth's regent, but most likely never informed him of this.

=== Initial recruitment ===
Robert Catesby, a man of "ancient, historic and distinguished lineage", was the inspiration behind the plot. He was described by contemporaries as "a good-looking man, about six feet tall, athletic and a good swordsman". Along with several other conspirators, he took part in the Essex Rebellion in 1601 during which he was wounded and captured. Queen Elizabeth allowed him to escape with his life after fining him 4,000 marks (equivalent to more than £6 million in 2008), after which he sold his estate in Chastleton. (Note: Comparing relative average earnings of £3,000 in 1601 with 2008.)

In 1603 Catesby helped to organise a mission to the new king of Spain, Philip III, urging Philip to launch an invasion attempt on England, which they assured him would be well supported, particularly by the English Catholics. Thomas Wintour was chosen as the emissary, but the Spanish king, although sympathetic to the plight of Catholics in England, was intent on making peace with James. Wintour had also attempted to convince the Spanish envoy Don Juan de Tassis that "3,000 Catholics" were ready and waiting to support such an invasion. Concern was voiced by Pope Clement VIII that using violence to achieve a restoration of Catholic power in England would result in the destruction of those that remained.

According to contemporary accounts, (Note: Some of the information in these accounts would have been given under pain or threat of torture, and may also have been subject to government interference, and should therefore be viewed with caution.) in February 1604, Catesby invited Thomas Wintour to his house in Lambeth, where they discussed Catesby's plan to re-establish Catholicism in England by blowing up the House of Lords during the State Opening of Parliament. Wintour was known as a competent scholar, able to speak several languages, and he had fought with the English army in the Netherlands. His uncle, Francis Ingleby, had been executed for being a Catholic priest in 1586, and Wintour later converted to Catholicism. Also present at the meeting was John Wright, a devout Catholic said to be one of the best swordsmen of his day, and a man who had taken part with Catesby in the Earl of Essex's rebellion three years earlier. Despite his reservations over the possible repercussions should the attempt fail, Wintour agreed to join the conspiracy, perhaps persuaded by Catesby's rhetoric: "Let us give the attempt and where it faileth, pass no further."

Wintour travelled to Flanders to enquire about Spanish support. While there, he sought out Guy Fawkes, a committed Catholic who had served as a soldier in the Southern Netherlands under the command of William Stanley, and in 1603 had been recommended for a captaincy. Accompanied by John Wright's brother Christopher, Fawkes had also been a member of the 1603 delegation to the Spanish court pleading for an invasion of England. Wintour told Fawkes that "some good frends of his wished his company in Ingland", and that certain gentlemen "were uppon a resolution to doe some whatt in Ingland if the pece with Spain healped us nott". The two men returned to England late in April 1604, telling Catesby that Spanish support was unlikely. Thomas Percy, Catesby's friend and John Wright's brother-in-law, was introduced to the plot several weeks later.

Percy had found employment with his kinsman the Earl of Northumberland, and by 1596, was his agent for the family's northern estates. About 1600–1601 he served with his patron in the Low Countries. At some point during Northumberland's command in the Low Countries, Percy became his agent in his communications with James I. Percy was reputedly a "serious" character who had converted to the Catholic faith. His early years were, according to a Catholic source, marked by a tendency to rely on "his sword and personal courage". Northumberland, although not a Catholic himself, planned to build a strong relationship with James I in order to better the prospects of English Catholics, and to reduce the family disgrace caused by his cousin's separation from his wife Martha Wright, a favourite of Elizabeth I.

Thomas Percy's meetings with James seemed to go well. Percy returned with promises of support for the Catholics, and Northumberland believed that James would go so far as to allow Mass in private houses, so as not to cause public offence. Percy, keen to improve his standing, went even further, claiming that the future king would guarantee the safety of English Catholics.

=== Initial planning ===
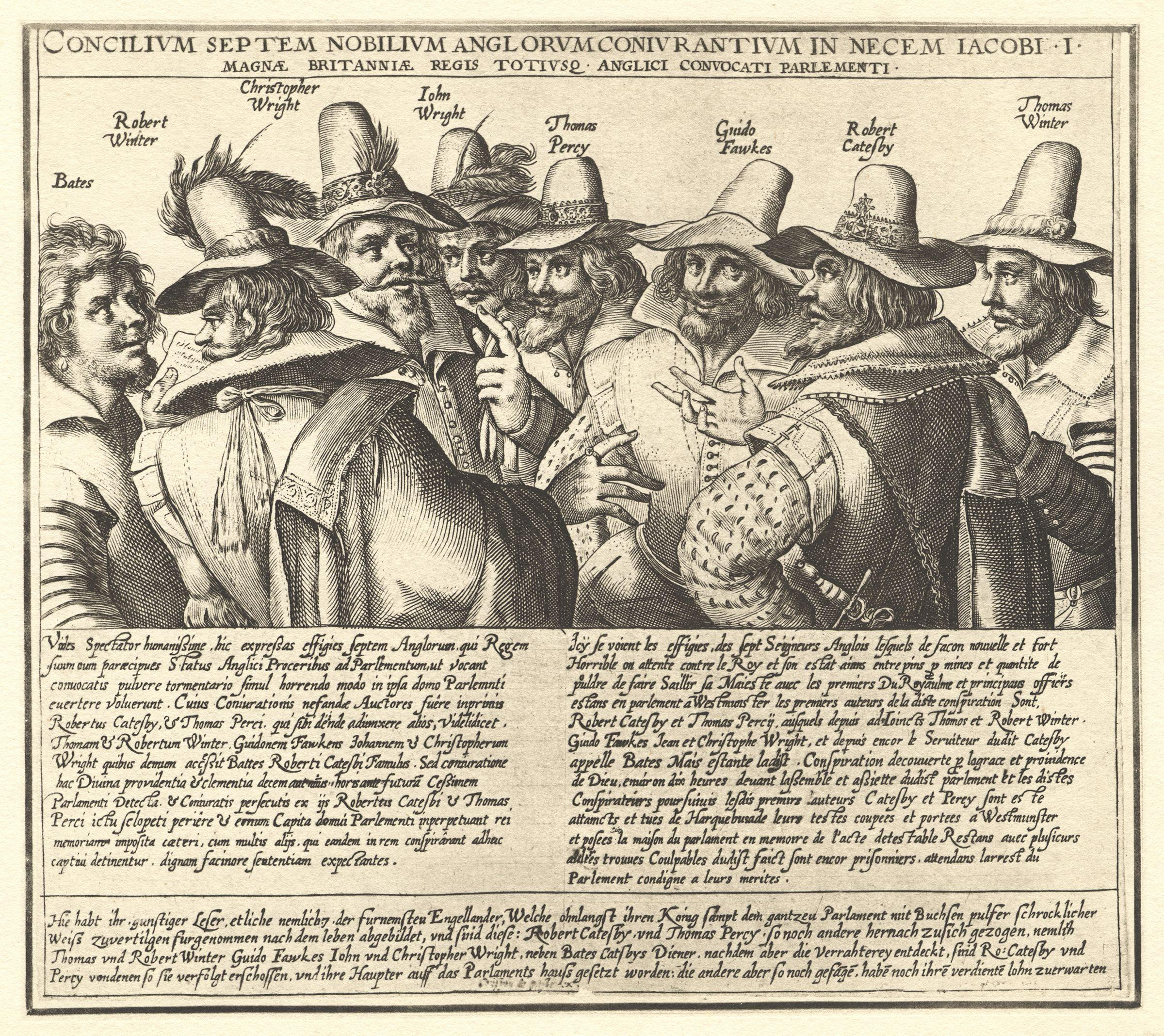
Engraving of eight of the thirteen conspirators, by Crispijn van de Passe. Missing are Digby, Keyes, Rookwood, Grant, and Tresham.

The first meeting between the five conspirators took place on 20 May 1604, probably at the Duck and Drake Inn, just off the Strand, Thomas Wintour's usual residence when staying in London. Catesby, Thomas Wintour, and John Wright were in attendance, joined by Guy Fawkes and Thomas Percy. Alone in a private room, the five plotters swore an oath of secrecy on a prayer book. By coincidence, and ignorant of the plot, John Gerard (a friend of Catesby's) was celebrating Mass in another room, and the five men subsequently received the Eucharist.

=== Further recruitment ===
The adjournment of Parliament gave the conspirators, they thought, until February 1605 to finalise their plans. On 9 June 1604, Percy's patron, the Earl of Northumberland, appointed him to the Band of Gentlemen Pensioners, a mounted troop of 50 bodyguards to the King. This role gave Percy reason to seek a base in London, and a small property near the Prince's Chamber owned by Henry Ferrers, a tenant of John Whynniard, was chosen. Percy arranged for the use of the house through Northumberland's agents, Dudley Carleton and John Hippisley. Fawkes, using the pseudonym "John Johnson", took charge of the building, posing as Percy's servant.

The building was occupied by Scottish commissioners appointed by the King to consider his plans for the unification of England and Scotland, so the plotters hired Catesby's lodgings in Lambeth, on the opposite bank of the Thames, from where their stored gunpowder and other supplies could be conveniently rowed across each night. Meanwhile, King James I continued with his policies against the Catholics, and Parliament pushed through anti-Catholic legislation, until its adjournment on 7 July.

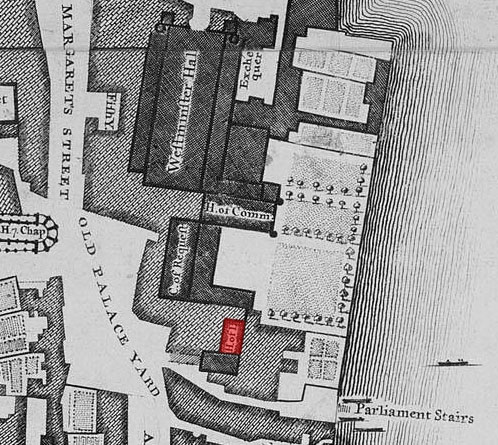
The House of Lords (highlighted in red) on John Rocque's 1746 map of London, within the Old Palace of Westminster. The River Thames is to the right.

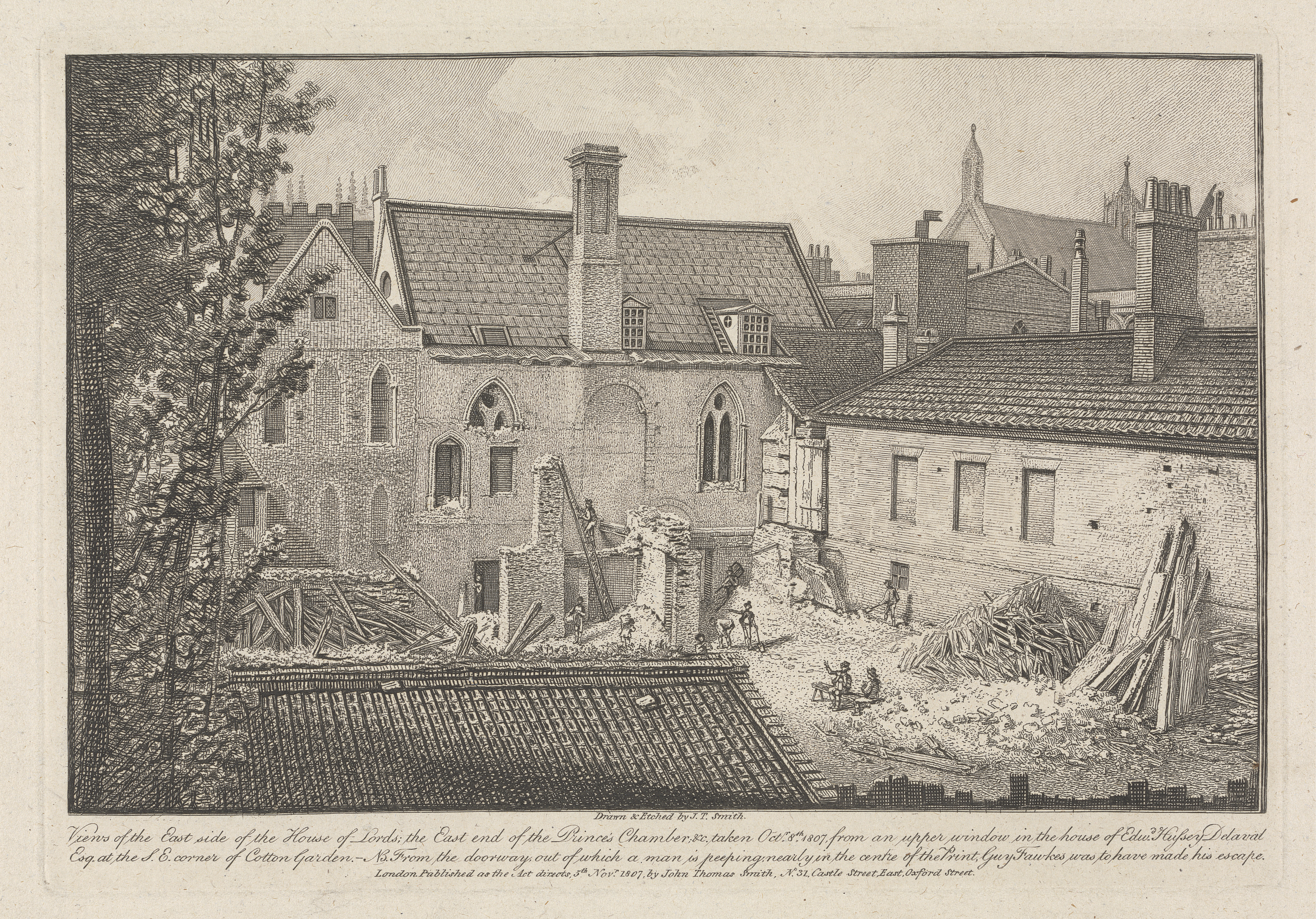
An early 19th-century illustration of the east end of the Prince's Chamber (extreme left) and the east wall of the House of Lords (centre)

Following their oath, the plotters left London and returned to their homes. The conspirators returned to London in October 1604, when Robert Keyes, a "desperate man, ruined and indebted", was admitted to the group. His responsibility was to take charge of Catesby's house in Lambeth, where the gunpowder and other supplies were to be stored. Keyes's family had notable connections; his wife's employer was the Catholic Lord Mordaunt. He was tall, with a red beard, and was seen as trustworthy and—like Fawkes—capable of looking after himself. In December (Note: According to his confession.) Catesby recruited his servant, Thomas Bates, into the plot, after the latter accidentally became aware of it.

It was announced on 24 December 1604 that the scheduled February re-opening of Parliament would be delayed. Concern over the plague meant that rather than sitting in February, as the plotters had originally planned for, Parliament would not sit again until 3 October 1605. The contemporaneous account of the prosecution claimed that during this delay the conspirators were digging a tunnel beneath Parliament. This may have been a government fabrication, as no evidence for the existence of a tunnel was presented by the prosecution, and no trace of one has ever been found. The account of a tunnel comes directly from Thomas Wintour's confession, and Guy Fawkes did not admit the existence of such a scheme until his fifth interrogation. Logistically, digging a tunnel would have proved extremely difficult, especially as none of the conspirators had any experience of mining. If the story is true, by 6 December 1604 the Scottish commissioners had finished their work, and the conspirators were busy tunnelling from their rented house to the House of Lords. They ceased their efforts when, during tunnelling, they heard a noise from above. The noise turned out to be the then-tenant's widow, who was clearing out the undercroft directly beneath the House of Lords—the room where the plotters eventually stored the gunpowder.

By the time the plotters reconvened at the start of the old style new year on Lady Day, 25 March 1605, three more had been admitted to their ranks; Robert Wintour, John Grant, and Christopher Wright. The additions of Wintour and Wright were obvious choices. Along with a small fortune, Robert Wintour inherited Huddington Court (a known refuge for priests) near Worcester, and was reputedly a generous and well-liked man. A devout Catholic, he married Gertrude, the daughter of John Talbot of Grafton, from a prominent Worcestershire family of recusants. Christopher Wright, John's brother, had also taken part in the Earl of Essex's revolt and had moved his family to Twigmore in Lincolnshire, then known as something of a haven for priests. John Grant was married to Wintour's sister, Dorothy, and was lord of the manor of Norbrook near Stratford-upon-Avon. Reputed to be an intelligent, thoughtful man, he sheltered Catholics at his home at Snitterfield, and was another who had been involved in the Essex revolt of 1601.

=== Undercroft ===
In addition, 25 March was the day on which the plotters purchased the lease to the undercroft they had supposedly tunnelled near to, owned by John Whynniard. The Palace of Westminster in the early 17th century was a warren of buildings clustered around the medieval chambers, chapels, and halls of the former royal palace that housed both Parliament and the various royal law courts. The old palace was easily accessible; merchants, lawyers, and others lived and worked in the lodgings, shops and taverns within its precincts. Whynniard's building was along a right-angle to the House of Lords, alongside a passageway called Parliament Place, which itself led to Parliament Stairs and the River Thames. Undercrofts were common features at the time, used to house a variety of materials including food and firewood. Whynniard's undercroft, on the ground floor, was directly beneath the first-floor House of Lords, and may once have been part of the palace's medieval kitchen. Unused and filthy, its location was ideal for what the group planned to do.

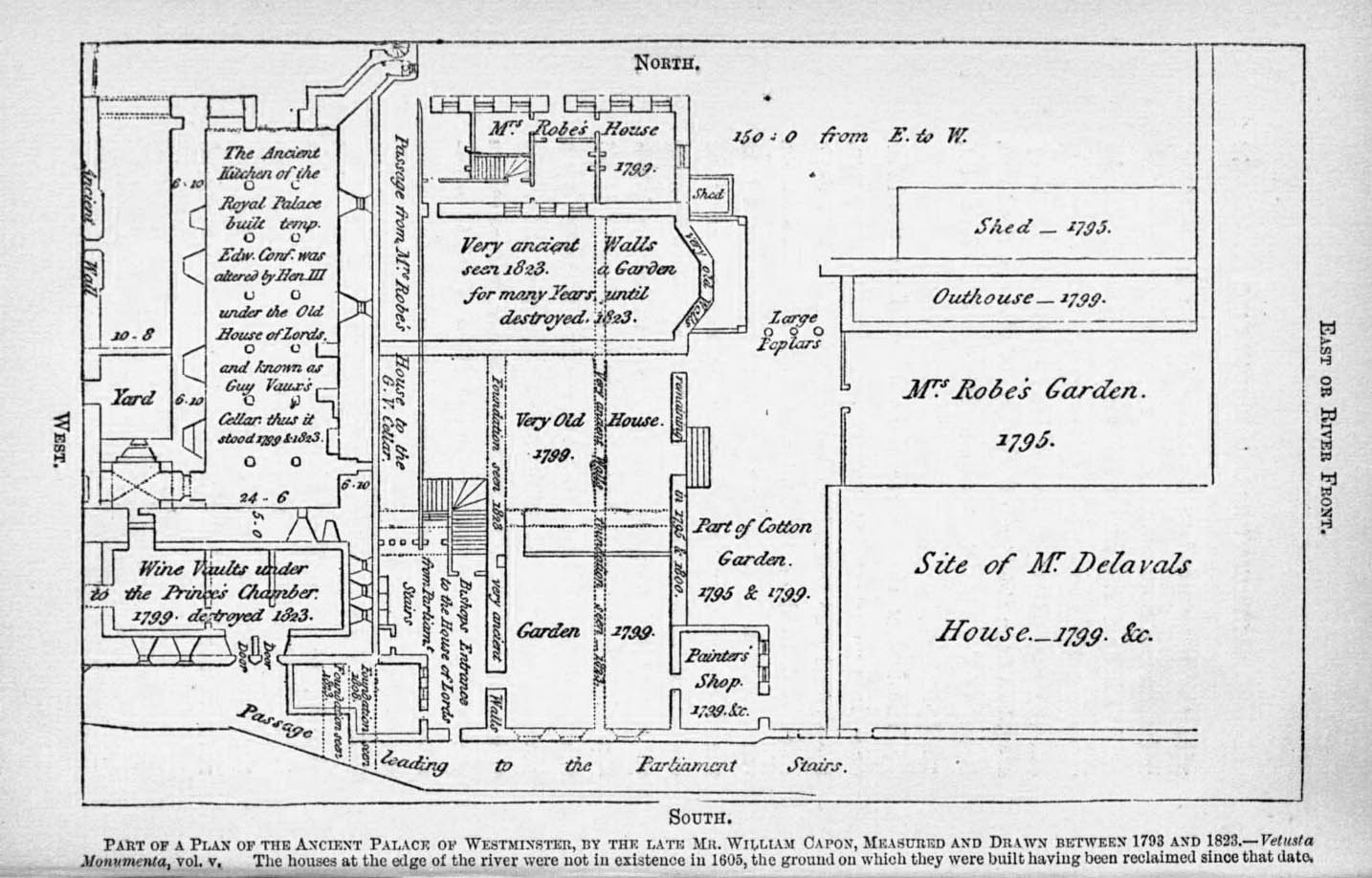
William Capon's map of Parliament clearly labels the undercroft used by "Guy Vaux" to store the gunpowder.

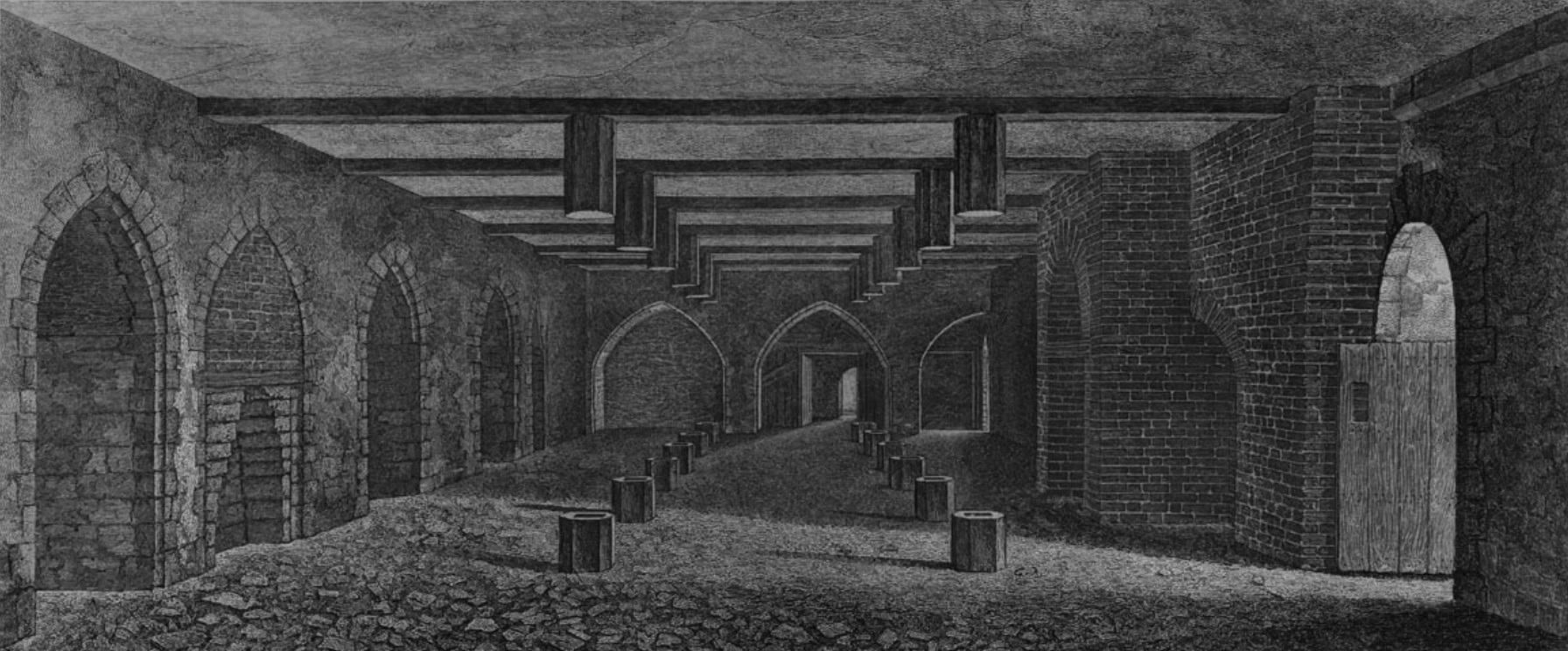
The undercroft beneath the House of Lords, as illustrated in 1799. At about the same time it was described as 77 feet long, 24 feet and 4 inches wide, and 10 feet high.

In the second week of June, Catesby met in London the principal Jesuit in England, Henry Garnet, and asked him about the morality of entering into an undertaking which might involve the destruction of the innocent, together with the guilty. Garnet answered that such actions could often be excused, but according to his own account later admonished Catesby during a second meeting in July in Essex, showing him a letter from the pope which forbade rebellion. Soon after, the Jesuit priest Oswald Tesimond told Garnet he had taken Catesby's confession, (Note: Haynes (2005) writes that Tesimond took Thomas Bates' confession.) in the course of which he had learnt of the plot. Garnet and Catesby met for a third time on 24 July 1605, at the house of the wealthy Catholic Anne Vaux in Enfield Chase. (Note: Anne Vaux was related to Catesby, and to most of the other plotters. Her home was often used to hide priests.) Garnet decided that Tesimond's account had been given under the seal of the confessional, and that canon law therefore forbade him to repeat what he had heard. Without acknowledging that he was aware of the precise nature of the plot, Garnet attempted to dissuade Catesby from his course, to no avail. Garnet wrote to a colleague in Rome, Claudio Acquaviva, expressing his concerns about open rebellion in England. He also told Acquaviva that "there is a risk that some private endeavour may commit treason or use force against the King", and urged the pope to issue a public brief against the use of force.

According to Fawkes, 20 barrels of gunpowder were brought in at first, followed by 16 more on 20 July. The supply of gunpowder was theoretically controlled by the government, but it was easily obtained from illicit sources. (Note: Gunpowder could be purchased on the black market from soldiers, militia, merchant vessels, and powdermills.) On 28 July, the ever-present threat of the plague again delayed the opening of Parliament, this time until Tuesday 5 November. Fawkes left the country for a short time. The King, meanwhile, spent much of the summer away from the city, hunting. He stayed wherever was convenient, including on occasion at the houses of prominent Catholics. Garnet, convinced that the threat of an uprising had receded, travelled the country on a pilgrimage.

It is uncertain when Fawkes returned to England, but he was back in London by late August, when he and Wintour discovered that the gunpowder stored in the undercroft had decayed. More gunpowder was brought into the room, along with firewood to conceal it. The final three conspirators were recruited in late 1605. At Michaelmas, Catesby persuaded the staunchly Catholic Ambrose Rookwood to rent Clopton House near Stratford-upon-Avon. Rookwood was a young man with recusant connections, whose stable of horses at Coldham Hall in Stanningfield, Suffolk was an important factor in his enlistment. His parents, Robert Rookwood and Dorothea Drury, were wealthy landowners, and had educated their son at a Jesuit school near Calais. Everard Digby was a young man who was generally well liked, and lived at Gayhurst House in Buckinghamshire. He had been knighted by the King in April 1603, and was converted to Catholicism by Gerard. Digby and his wife, Mary Mulshaw, had accompanied the priest on his pilgrimage, and the two men were reportedly close friends. Digby was asked by Catesby to rent Coughton Court near Alcester. Digby also promised £1,500 after Percy failed to pay the rent due for the properties he had taken in Westminster. Finally, on 14 October Catesby invited Francis Tresham into the conspiracy. Tresham was the son of the Catholic Thomas Tresham, and a cousin to Robert Catesby; the two had been raised together. He was also the heir to his father's large fortune, which had been depleted by recusant fines, expensive tastes, and by Francis and Catesby's involvement in the Essex revolt. (Note: Thomas Tresham had paid Francis's fine in full and part of Catesby's fine.)

Catesby and Tresham met at the home of Tresham's brother-in-law and cousin, Lord Stourton. In his confession, Tresham claimed that he had asked Catesby if the plot would damn their souls, to which Catesby had replied it would not, and that the plight of England's Catholics required that it be done. Catesby also apparently asked for £2,000, and the use of Rushton Hall in Northamptonshire. Tresham declined both requests (although he did give £100 to Thomas Wintour), and told his interrogators that he had moved his family from Rushton to London in advance of the plot; hardly the actions of a guilty man, he claimed.

=== Monteagle letter ===
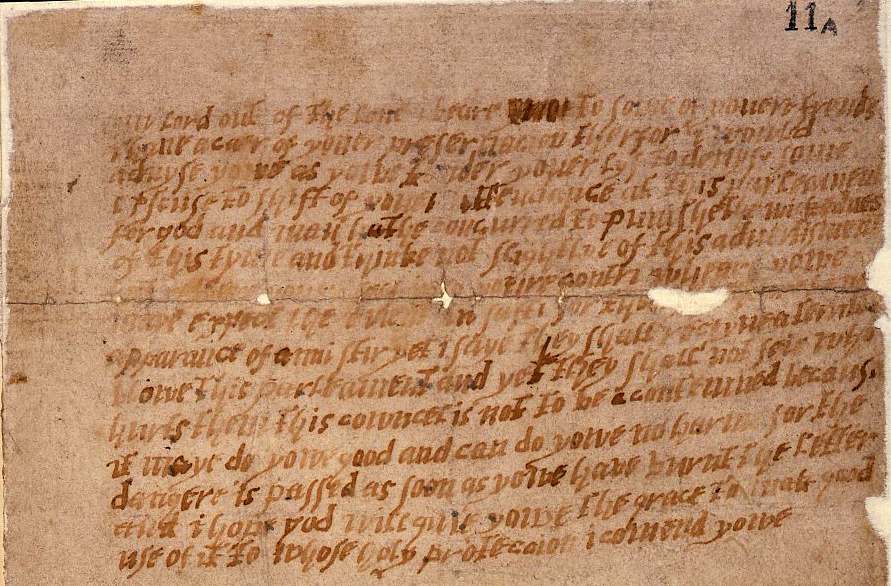
An anonymous letter, sent to William Parker, 4th Baron Monteagle, was instrumental in exposing the plot. Its author's identity has never been reliably established, although Francis Tresham has long been a suspect. Monteagle himself has been considered responsible, as has Salisbury.

The details of the plot were finalised in October, in a series of taverns across London and Daventry. (Note: The playwright Ben Jonson was present at one of these parties, and following the discovery of the plot was forced to work hard at distancing himself from the conspirators.) Fawkes would be left to light the fuse and then escape across the Thames, while simultaneously a revolt in the Midlands would help to ensure the capture of the King's daughter, Elizabeth. Fawkes would leave for the continent, to explain events in England to the European Catholic powers.

The wives of those involved and Anne Vaux (a friend of Garnet who often shielded priests at her home) became increasingly concerned by what they suspected was about to happen. Several of the conspirators expressed worries about the safety of fellow Catholics who would be present in Parliament on the day of the planned explosion. Percy was concerned for his patron, Northumberland, and the young Earl of Arundel's name was brought up; Catesby suggested that a minor wound might keep him from the chamber on that day. The Lords Vaux, Montagu, Monteagle, and Stourton were also mentioned. Keyes suggested warning Lord Mordaunt, his wife's employer, to derision from Catesby.

On 26 October, a servant delivered a letter for Lord Monteagle to his house in Hoxton, that they received from a stranger on the road. The letter stated:

My Lord, out of the love I bear to some of your friends, I have a care of your preservation. Therefore I would advise you, as you tender your life, to devise some excuse to shift your attendance at this parliament; for God and man hath concurred to punish the wickedness of this time. And think not slightly of this advertisement, but retire yourself into your country where you may expect the event in safety. For though there be no appearance of any stir, yet I say they shall receive a terrible blow this Parliament; and yet they shall not see who hurts them. This counsel is not to be condemned because it may do you good and can do you no harm; for the danger is passed as soon as you have burnt the letter. And I hope God will give you the grace to make good use of it, to whose holy protection I commend you.

Uncertain of the letter's meaning, Monteagle promptly rode to Whitehall and handed it to Cecil (then Earl of Salisbury). Salisbury informed the Earl of Worcester, considered to have recusant sympathies, and the suspected Catholic Henry Howard, 1st Earl of Northampton, but kept news of the plot from the King, who was busy hunting in Cambridgeshire and not expected back for several days. Monteagle's servant, Thomas Ward, had family connections with the Wright brothers, and sent a message to Catesby about the betrayal. Catesby, who had been due to go hunting with the King, suspected that Tresham was responsible for the letter, and with Thomas Wintour confronted the recently recruited conspirator. Tresham managed to convince the pair that he had not written the letter, but urged them to abandon the plot. Salisbury was already aware of certain stirrings before he received the letter, but did not yet know the exact nature of the plot, or who exactly was involved. He therefore elected to wait, to see how events unfolded.

=== Discovery ===
The letter was shown to the King on the first of November following his arrival back in London. Upon reading it, James immediately seized upon the word "blow" and felt that it hinted at "some strategem of fire and powder", perhaps an explosion exceeding in violence the one that killed his father, Lord Darnley, at Kirk o' Field in 1567. Keen not to seem too intriguing, and wanting to allow the King to take the credit for unveiling the conspiracy, Salisbury feigned ignorance. The following day members of the Privy Council visited the King at the Palace of Whitehall and informed him that, based on the information that Salisbury had given them a week earlier, on Monday the Lord Chamberlain Thomas Howard, 1st Earl of Suffolk, would undertake a search of the Houses of Parliament, "both above and below". On Sunday 3 November, Percy, Catesby and Wintour had a final meeting, where Percy told his colleagues that they should "abide the uttermost triall", and reminded them of their ship waiting at anchor on the Thames.

By 4 November, Digby was ensconced with a "hunting party" at Dunchurch, ready to abduct Elizabeth. The same day, Percy visited the Earl of Northumberland—who was uninvolved in the conspiracy—to see if he could discern what rumours surrounded the letter to Monteagle. Percy returned to London and assured Wintour, John Wright, and Robert Keyes that they had nothing to be concerned about, and returned to his lodgings on Gray's Inn Road. That same evening Catesby, likely accompanied by John Wright and Bates, set off for the Midlands. Fawkes visited Keyes, and was given a pocket watch left by Percy, to time the fuse, and an hour later Rookwood received several engraved swords from a local cutler.

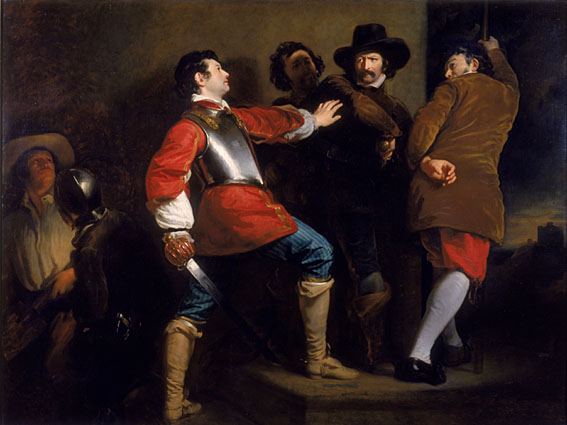
The Discovery of the Gunpowder Plot and the Taking of Guy Fawkes (c. 1823) by Henry Perronet Briggs

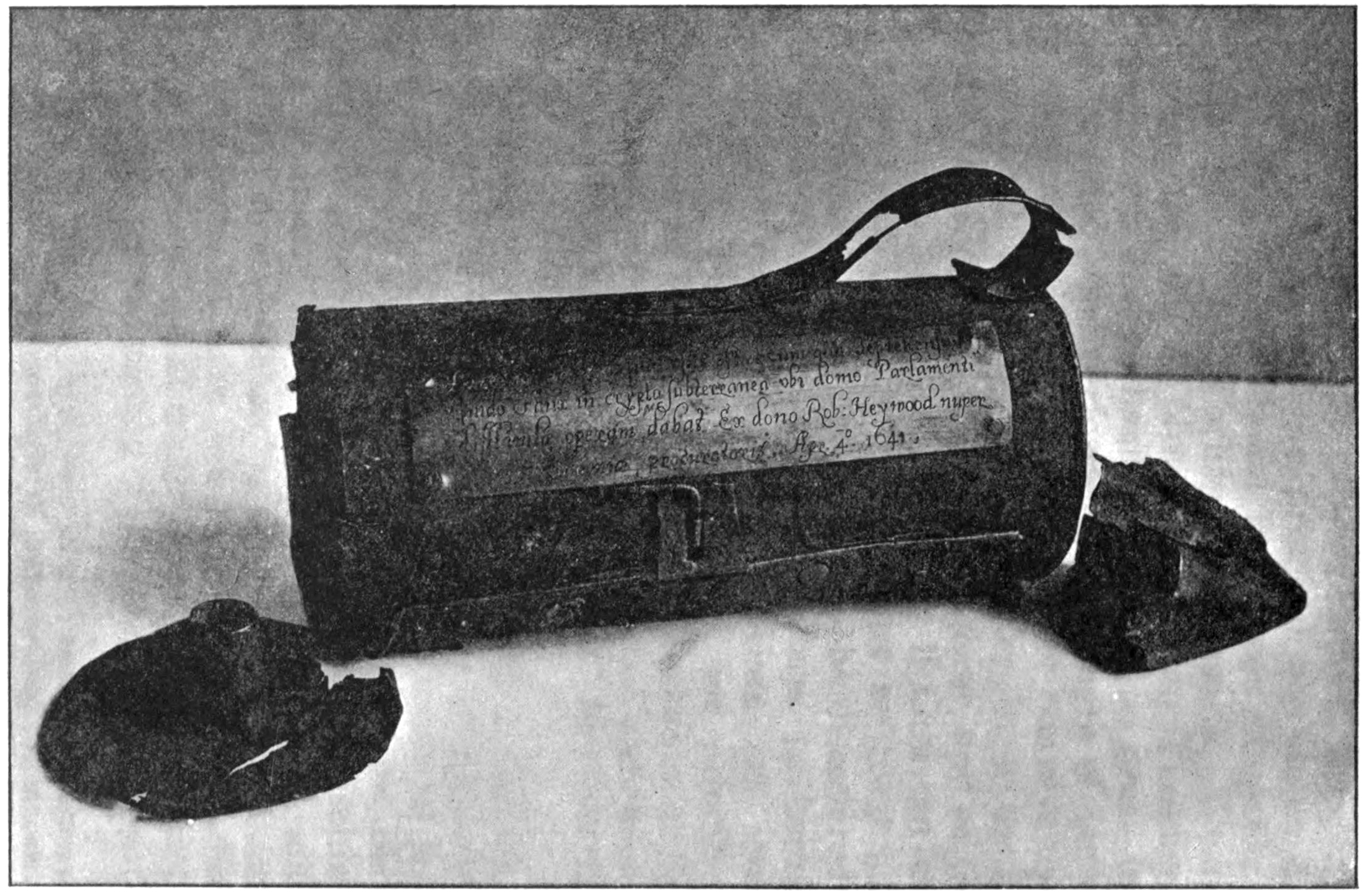
The lantern which Guy Fawkes used during the plot

Although two accounts of the number of searches and their timing exist, according to the King's version, the first search of the buildings in and around Parliament was made on Monday 4 November—as the plotters were busy making their final preparations—by Suffolk, Monteagle, and John Whynniard. They found a large pile of firewood in the undercroft beneath the House of Lords, accompanied by what they presumed to be a serving man (Fawkes), who told them that the firewood belonged to his master, Thomas Percy. They left to report their findings, at which time Fawkes also left the building. The mention of Percy's name aroused further suspicion as he was already known to the authorities as a Catholic agitator. The King insisted that a more thorough search be undertaken. Late that night, the search party, headed by Thomas Knyvet, returned to the undercroft. They again found Fawkes, dressed in a cloak and hat, and wearing boots and spurs. He was arrested, whereupon he gave his name as John Johnson. He was carrying a lantern now held in the Ashmolean Museum, Oxford, and a search of his person revealed a pocket watch, several slow matches and touchwood. Thirty-six barrels of gunpowder were discovered hidden under piles of faggots and coal. Fawkes was taken to the King early on the morning of 5 November.

=== Flight ===
As news of "John Johnson's" arrest spread among the plotters still in London, most fled northwest, along Watling Street. Christopher Wright and Thomas Percy left together. Rookwood left soon after, and managed to cover 30 miles in two hours on one horse. He overtook Keyes, who had set off earlier, then Wright and Percy at Little Brickhill, before catching Catesby, John Wright, and Bates on the same road. Reunited, the group continued northwest to Dunchurch, using horses provided by Digby. Keyes went to Mordaunt's house at Drayton. Meanwhile, Thomas Wintour stayed in London, and even went to Westminster to see what was happening. When he realised the plot had been uncovered, he took his horse and made for his sister's house at Norbrook, before continuing to Huddington Court. (Note: Robert Wintour inherited Huddington Court near Worcester, along with a small fortune. The building became a refuge for priests, and secret Masses were often celebrated there.)

On the 5th of November we began our Parliament, to which the King should have come in person, but refrained through a practise but that morning discovered. The plot was to have blown up the King at such time as he should have been set on his Royal Throne, accompanied with all his Children, Nobility and Commoners and assisted with all Bishops, Judges and Doctors; at one instant and blast to have ruin'd the whole State and Kingdom of England. And for the effecting of this, there was placed under the Parliament House, where the king should sit, some 30 barrels of powder, with good store of wood, faggots, pieces and bars of iron.

— Extract of a letter from Sir Edward Hoby (Gentleman of the Bedchamber) to Sir Thomas Edwards, Ambassador at Brussells [sic]

The group of six conspirators stopped at Ashby St Ledgers at about 6 pm, where they met Robert Wintour and updated him on their situation. They then continued on to Dunchurch, and met with Digby. Catesby convinced him that despite the plot's failure, an armed struggle was still a real possibility. He announced to Digby's "hunting party" that the King and Salisbury were dead, before the fugitives moved west to Warwick.

In London, news of the plot was spreading, and the authorities set extra guards on the city gates, closed the ports, and protected the house of the Spanish Ambassador, which was surrounded by an angry mob. An arrest warrant was issued against Thomas Percy, and his patron, the Earl of Northumberland, was placed under house arrest. In "John Johnson's" initial interrogation he revealed nothing other than the name of his mother, and that he was from Yorkshire. A letter to Guy Fawkes was discovered on his person, but he claimed that name was one of his aliases. Far from denying his intentions, "Johnson" stated that it had been his purpose to destroy the King and Parliament. (Note: As King James put it, Fawkes intended the destruction "not only ... of my person, nor of my wife and posterity also, but of the whole body of the State in general".) Nevertheless, he maintained his composure and insisted that he had acted alone. His unwillingness to yield so impressed the King that he described him as possessing "a Roman resolution".

=== Investigation ===
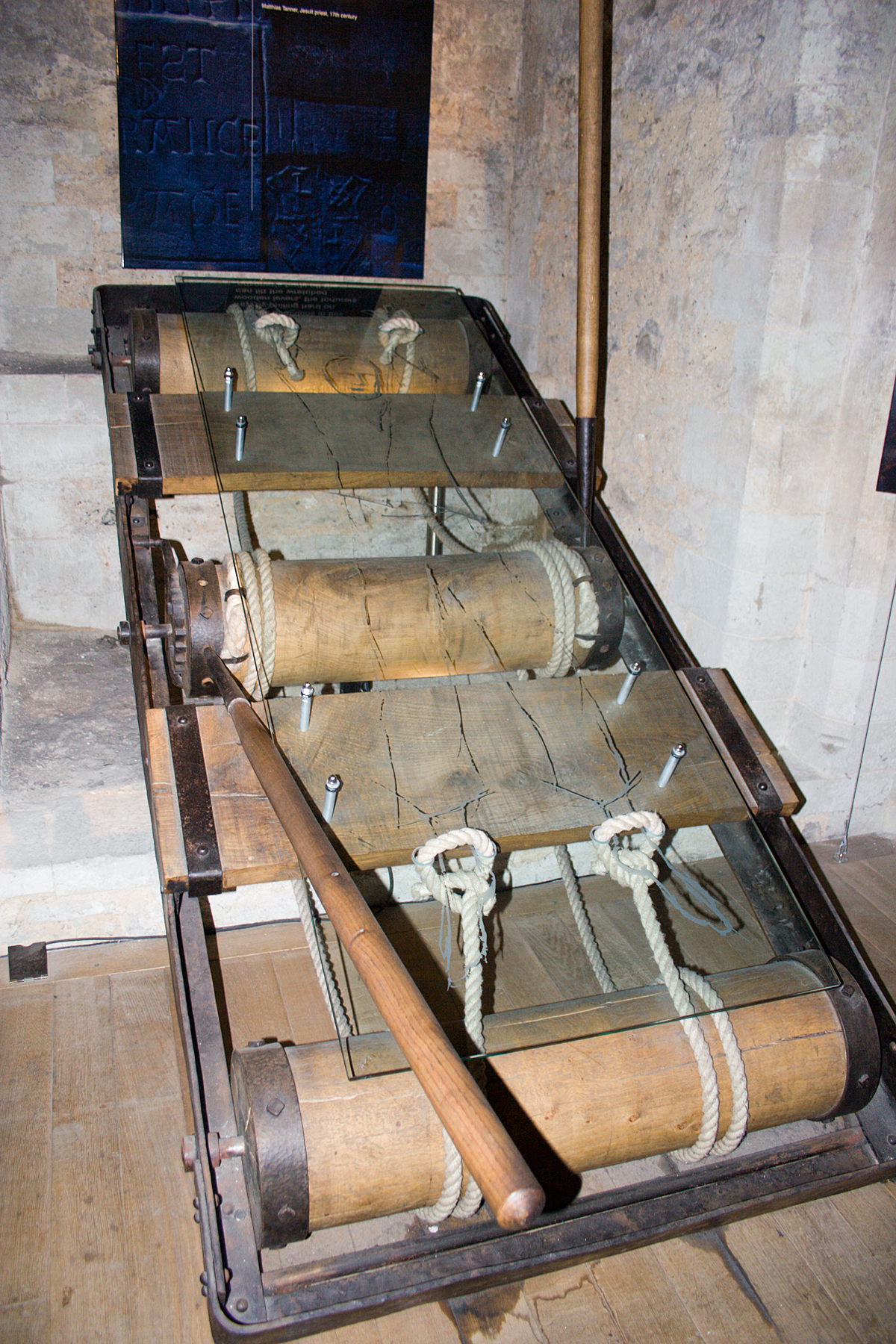
A torture rack in the Tower of London

On 6 November, the Lord Chief Justice, Sir John Popham (a man with a deep-seated hatred of Catholics) questioned Rookwood's servants. By the evening he had learned the names of several of those involved in the conspiracy: Catesby, Rookwood, Keyes, Wynter [sic], John and Christopher Wright, and Grant. "Johnson" meanwhile persisted with his story, and along with the gunpowder he was found with, (Note: The gunpowder was moved to the Tower of London, where it was described as "decayed".) was moved to the Tower of London, where the King had decided that "Johnson" would be tortured. The use of torture was forbidden, except by royal prerogative or a body such as the Privy Council or Star Chamber. In a letter of 6 November James wrote: "The gentler tortours [tortures] are to be first used unto him, et sic per gradus ad ima tenditur [and thus by steps extended to the bottom depths], and so God speed your good work." "Johnson" may have been placed in manacles and hung from the wall, but he was almost certainly subjected to the horrors of the rack. On 7 November his resolve was broken; he confessed late that day, and again over the following two days.

=== Last stand ===
On 6 November, with Fawkes maintaining his silence, the fugitives raided Warwick Castle for supplies, then continued to Norbrook to collect weapons. From there they continued their journey to Huddington. Bates left the group and travelled to Coughton Court to deliver a letter from Catesby, to Garnet and the other priests, informing them of what had transpired, and asking for their help in raising an army. Garnet replied by begging Catesby and his followers to stop their "wicked actions", before himself fleeing. Several priests set out for Warwick, worried about the fate of their colleagues. They were caught, and then imprisoned in London. Catesby and the others arrived at Huddington early in the afternoon, and were met by Thomas Wintour. They received practically no support or sympathy from those they met, including family members, who were terrified at the prospect of being associated with treason. They continued on to Holbeche House on the border of Staffordshire, the home of Stephen Littleton, a member of their ever-decreasing band of followers. Whilst there, Stephen Littleton and Thomas Wintour went to Pepperhill, the Shropshire residence at Boningale of Robert Wintour's father-in-law John Talbot, to gain support, but to no avail. Tired and desperate, they spread out some of the now-soaked gunpowder in front of the fire, to dry out. Although gunpowder does not explode unless physically contained, a spark from the fire landed on the powder and the resultant flames engulfed Catesby, Rookwood, Grant, and a man named Morgan, who was a member of the hunting party.

Thomas Wintour and Littleton, on their way from Huddington to Holbeche House, were told by a messenger that Catesby had died. At that point, Littleton left, but Thomas arrived at the house to find Catesby alive, albeit scorched. John Grant was not so lucky, and had been blinded by the fire. Digby, Robert Wintour and his half-brother John, and Thomas Bates, had all left. Of the plotters, only the singed figures of Catesby and Grant, the Wright brothers, Rookwood, and Percy remained. The fugitives resolved to stay in the house and wait for the arrival of the King's men.

Richard Walsh (Sheriff of Worcestershire) and his company of 200 men besieged Holbeche House on the morning of 8 November. Thomas Wintour was hit in the shoulder while crossing the courtyard. John Wright was shot, followed by his brother, and then Rookwood. Catesby and Percy were reportedly killed by a single lucky shot. The attackers rushed the property, and stripped the dead or dying defenders of their clothing. Grant, Morgan, Rookwood, and Wintour were arrested.

== Reaction ==
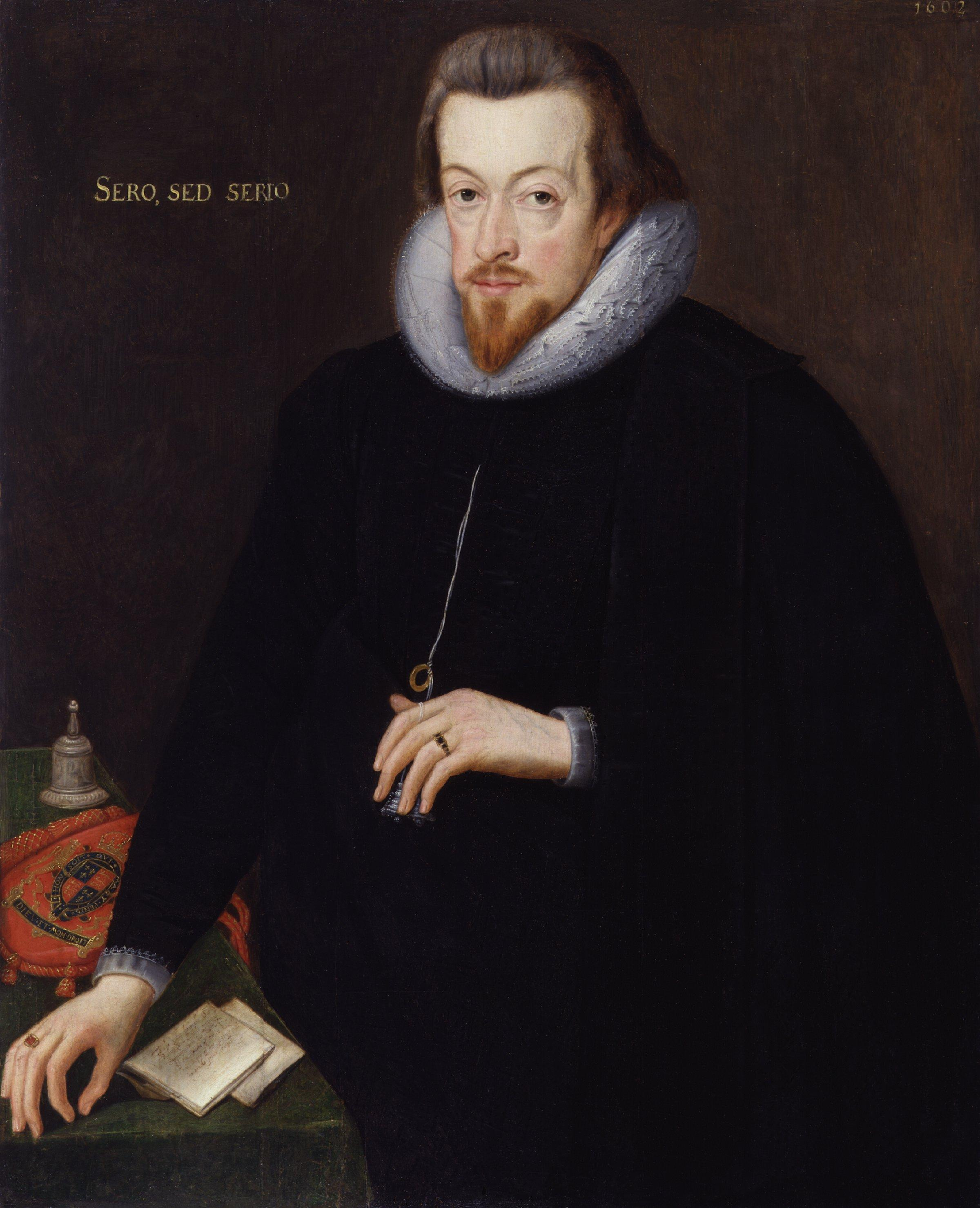
Robert Cecil, 1st Earl of Salisbury; painting by John de Critz the Elder, 1602

Bates and Keyes were captured shortly after Holbeche House was taken. Digby, who had intended to give himself up, was caught by a small group of pursuers. Tresham was arrested on 12 November, and taken to the Tower three days later. Montague, Mordaunt, and Stourton (Tresham's brother-in-law) were also imprisoned in the Tower. The Earl of Northumberland joined them on 27 November. Meanwhile, the government used the revelation of the plot to accelerate its persecution of Catholics. The home of Anne Vaux at Enfield Chase was searched, revealing the presence of trap doors and hidden passages. A terrified servant then revealed that Garnet, who had often stayed at the house, had recently given a Mass there. John Gerard was secreted at the home of Elizabeth Vaux, in Harrowden. Vaux was taken to London for interrogation. There she was resolute: she had never been aware that Gerard was a priest, she had presumed he was a "Catholic gentleman", and she did not know of his whereabouts. The homes of the conspirators were searched, and looted; Mary Digby's household was ransacked, and she was made destitute. Some time before the end of November, Garnet moved to Hindlip Hall near Worcester, the home of the Habingtons, where he wrote a letter to the Privy Council protesting his innocence.

The foiling of the Gunpowder Plot initiated a wave of national relief at the delivery of the King and his sons, and inspired in the ensuing parliament a mood of loyalty and goodwill, which Salisbury astutely exploited to extract higher subsidies for the King than any (bar one) granted in Elizabeth I's reign. Walter Raleigh, who was languishing in the Tower owing to his involvement in the Main Plot, and whose wife was a first cousin of Lady Catesby, declared he had had no knowledge of the conspiracy. The Bishop of Rochester gave a sermon at St. Paul's Cross, in which he condemned the plot. In his speech to both Houses on 9 November, James expounded on two emerging preoccupations of his monarchy: the divine right of kings and the Catholic question. He insisted that the plot had been the work of only a few Catholics, not of the English Catholics as a whole, (Note: James said that it did not follow "that all professing that Romish religion were guilty of the same".) and he reminded the assembly to rejoice at his survival, since kings were divinely appointed and he owed his escape to a miracle. Salisbury wrote to his English ambassadors abroad, informing them of what had occurred, and also reminding them that the King bore no ill will to his Catholic neighbours. The foreign powers largely distanced themselves from the plotters, calling them atheists and Protestant heretics.

=== Interrogations ===
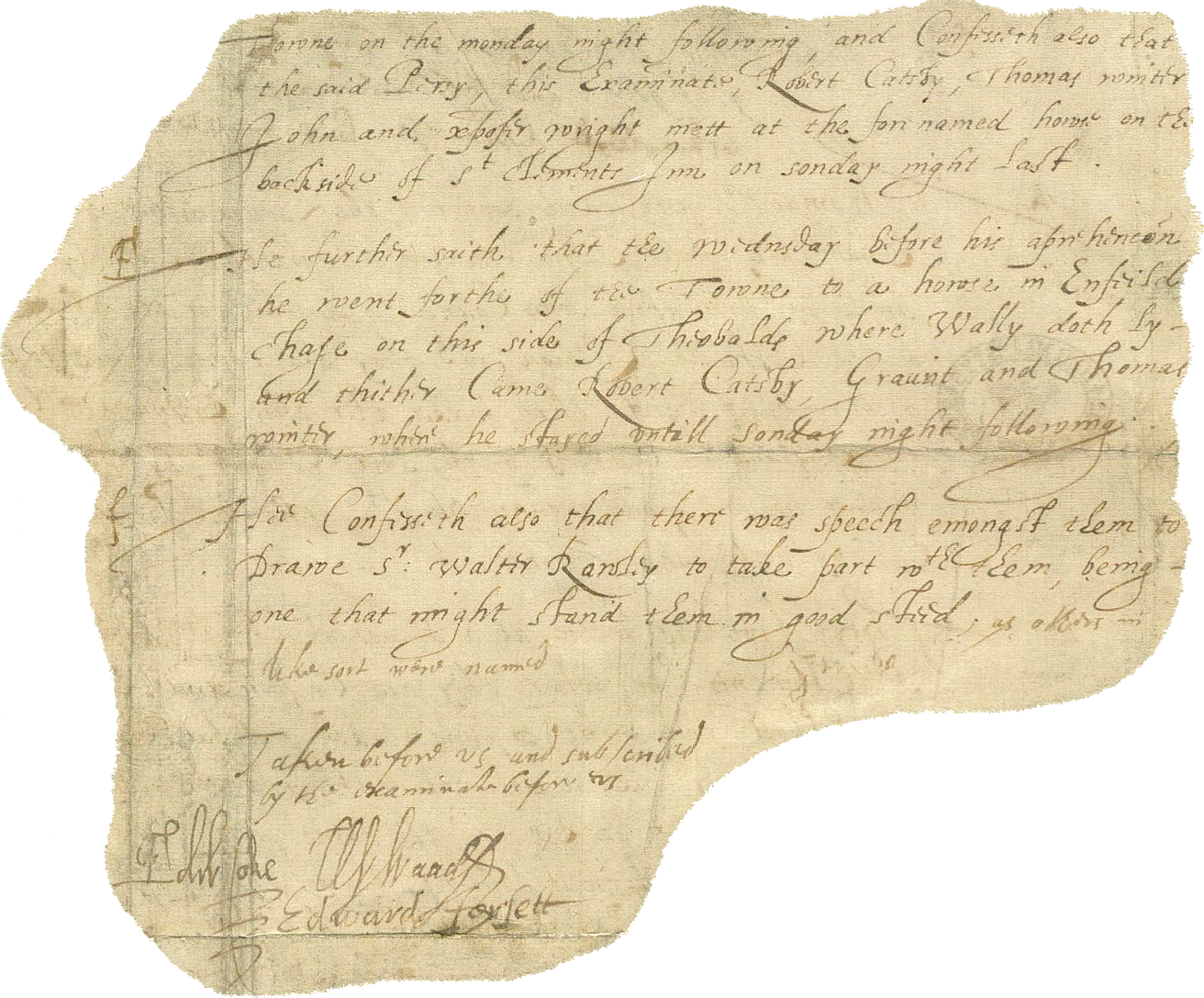
Part of a confession by Guy Fawkes. His weak signature, made soon after his torture, is faintly visible under the word "good" (lower right).

Sir Edward Coke was in charge of the interrogations. Over a period of about ten weeks, in the Lieutenant's Lodgings at the Tower of London (now known as the Queen's House) he questioned those who had been implicated in the plot. For the first round of interrogations, no real proof exists that these people were tortured, although on several occasions Salisbury certainly suggested that they should be. Coke later revealed that the threat of torture was in most cases enough to elicit a confession from those caught up in the aftermath of the plot.

Only two confessions were printed in full: Fawkes's confession of 8 November, and Wintour's of 23 November. Having been involved in the conspiracy from the start (unlike Fawkes), Wintour was able to give extremely valuable information to the Privy Council. The handwriting on his testimony is almost certainly that of the man himself, but his signature was markedly different. Wintour had previously only ever signed his name as such, but his confession is signed "Winter", and since he had been shot in the shoulder, the steady hand used to write the signature may indicate some measure of government interference—or it may indicate that writing a shorter version of his name was less painful. Wintour's testimony makes no mention of his brother, Robert. Both were published in the so-called King's Book, a hastily written official account of the conspiracy published in late November 1605.

Henry Percy, Earl of Northumberland, was in a difficult position. His midday dinner with Thomas Percy on 4 November was damning evidence against him, and after Thomas Percy's death there was nobody who could either implicate him or clear him. The Privy Council suspected that Northumberland would have been Princess Elizabeth's protector had the plot succeeded, but there was insufficient evidence to convict him. Northumberland remained in the Tower and on 27 June 1606 was finally charged with contempt. He was stripped of all public offices, fined £30,000 (about £7.8 million in 2025), and kept in the Tower until June 1621. The Lords Mordaunt and Stourton were tried in the Star Chamber. They were condemned to imprisonment in the Tower, where they remained until 1608, when they were transferred to the Fleet Prison. Both were also given significant fines.

Several other people not involved in the conspiracy, but known or related to the conspirators, were also questioned. Northumberland's brothers, Sir Allen and Sir Josceline Percy, were arrested. Lord Montagu had employed Fawkes at an early age, and had also met Catesby on 29 October, and was therefore of interest; he was released several months later. Agnes Wenman was from a Catholic family, and related to Elizabeth Vaux. (Note: Vaux had written a letter to Wenman regarding the marriage of her son Edward Vaux. The letter contained certain phrases which were open to interpretation, and was intercepted by Richard Wenman, who thought it suspicious.) She was examined twice but the charges against her were eventually dropped. Percy's secretary and later the controller of Northumberland's household, Dudley Carleton, had leased the vault where the gunpowder was stored, and consequently he was imprisoned in the Tower. Salisbury believed his story, and authorised his release.

=== Jesuits ===
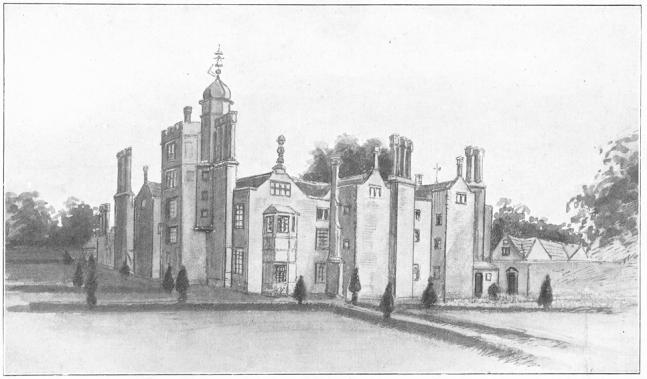
Hindlip Hall in Worcestershire

Thomas Bates confessed on 4 December, providing much of the information that Salisbury needed to link the Catholic clergy to the plot. Bates had been present at most of the conspirators' meetings, and under interrogation he implicated Tesimond in the plot. On 13 January 1606, he described how he had visited Garnet and Tesimond on 7 November to inform Garnet of the plot's failure. Bates also told his interrogators of his ride with Tesimond to Huddington, before the priest left him to head for the Habingtons at Hindlip Hall, and of a meeting between Garnet, Gerard, and Tesimond in October 1605.

At about the same time in December, Tresham's health began to deteriorate. He was visited regularly by his wife, a nurse, and his servant William Vavasour—who documented his strangury. Before he died, Tresham had also told of Garnet's involvement with the 1603 mission to Spain, but in his last hours he retracted some of these statements. Nowhere in his confession did he mention the Monteagle letter. He died early on the morning of 23 December, and was buried in the Tower. Nevertheless, he was attainted along with the other plotters; his head was set on a pike either (accounts differ) at Northampton or London Bridge, and his estates confiscated.

On 15 January a proclamation named Garnet, Gerard, and Greenway (Tesimond) as wanted men. Tesimond and Gerard escaped the country and lived out their days in freedom. Several days earlier, on 9 January, Robert Wintour and Stephen Littleton had been captured. They had been hiding at Hagley, the home of Humphrey Littleton, brother of MP John Littleton, imprisoned for treason in 1601 for his part in the Essex revolt. They were betrayed by a cook, who grew suspicious of the amount of food sent up for his master's consumption. Humphrey denied the presence of the two fugitives, but another servant led the authorities to their hiding place. On 20 January, the local Justice of the Peace and his retainers arrived at Thomas Habington's home, Hindlip Hall, to arrest the Jesuits. Despite Thomas Habington's protests, the men spent the next four days searching the house. On 24 January, starving, the Jesuit lay-brothers Nicholas Owen (who had built the hides at Hindlip) and Ralph Ashley, the servant of Edward Oldcorne (Habington's chaplain) left their hiding place and were arrested. Humphrey Littleton, who had escaped from the authorities at Hagley, got as far as Prestwood in Staffordshire before he was captured. He was imprisoned, and then condemned to death at Worcester. On 26 January, in an attempt to trade his friends for his life, he told the authorities where they could find Garnet. Worn down by hiding for so long, Garnet, accompanied by Oldcorne, emerged from his priest hole the next day.

=== Trials ===
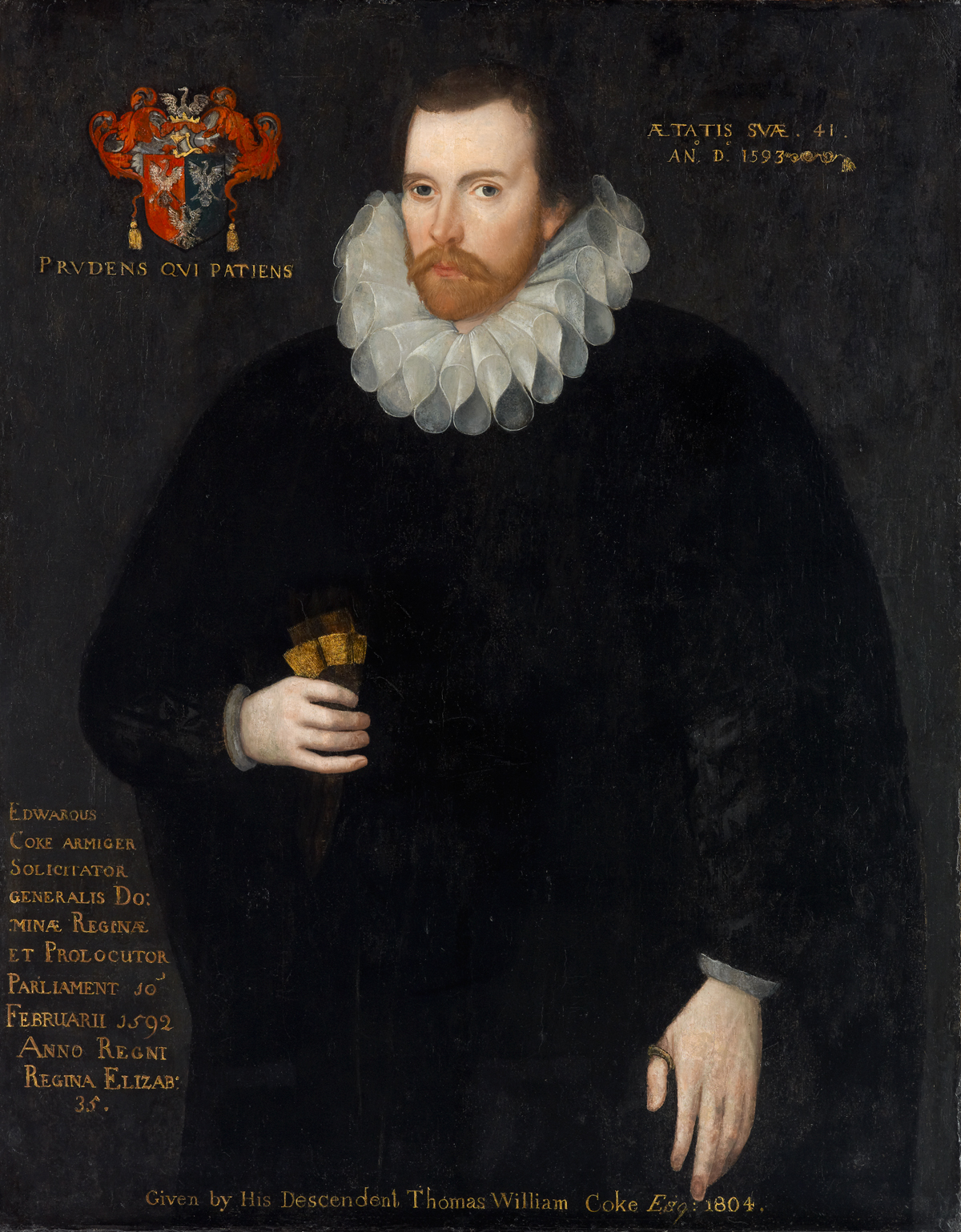
Edward Coke conducted the interrogations of those thought to be involved with the conspiracy.

By coincidence, on the same day that Garnet was found, the surviving conspirators were arraigned in Westminster Hall. Seven of the prisoners were taken from the Tower to the Star Chamber by barge. Bates, who was considered lower class, was brought from the Gatehouse Prison. Some of the prisoners were reportedly despondent, but others were nonchalant, even smoking tobacco. The King and his family, hidden from view, were among the many who watched the trial. The Lords Commissioners present were the Earls of Suffolk, Worcester, Northampton, Devonshire, and Salisbury. Sir John Popham was Lord Chief Justice, Sir Thomas Fleming was Lord Chief Baron of the Exchequer, and two Justices, Sir Thomas Walmsley and Sir Peter Warburton, sat as Justices of the Common Pleas. The list of traitors' names was read aloud, beginning with the priests: Garnet, Tesimond, and Gerard.

The first to speak was the Speaker of the House of Commons (later Master of the Rolls), Sir Edward Philips, who described the intent behind the plot in lurid detail. He was followed by the Attorney-General Sir Edward Coke, who began with a long speech—heavily influenced by Salisbury—that included a denial that the King had ever made any promises to the Catholics. Monteagle's part in the discovery of the plot was welcomed, and denunciations of the 1603 mission to Spain featured strongly. Fawkes's protestations that Gerard knew nothing of the plot were omitted from Coke's speech. The foreign powers, when mentioned, were accorded due respect, but the priests were accursed, their behaviour criticised wherever possible. There was little doubt, according to Coke, that the plot had been invented by the Jesuits. Garnet's meeting with Catesby, at which the former was said to have absolved the latter of any blame in the plot, was proof enough that the Jesuits were central to the conspiracy; according to Coke the Gunpowder Plot would always be known as the "Jesuit Treason". Coke spoke with feeling of the probable fate of the Queen and the rest of the King's family, and of the innocents who would have been caught up in the explosion.

I never yet knew a treason without a Romish priest; but in this there are very many Jesuits, who are known to have dealt and passed through the whole action.

— Sir Edward Coke

Each of the condemned, said Coke, would be drawn backwards to his death, by a horse, his head near the ground. He was to be "put to death halfway between heaven and earth as unworthy of both". His genitals would be cut off and burnt before his eyes, and his bowels and heart then removed. Then he would be decapitated, and the dismembered parts of his body displayed so that they might become "prey for the fowls of the air". Confessions and declarations from the prisoners were then read aloud, and finally the prisoners were allowed to speak. Rookwood claimed that he had been drawn into the plot by Catesby, "whom he loved above any worldy man". Thomas Wintour begged to be hanged for himself and his brother, so that his brother might be spared. Fawkes explained his not-guilty plea as ignorance of aspects of the indictment. Keyes appeared to accept his fate, Bates and Robert Wintour begged for mercy, and Grant explained his involvement as "a conspiracy intended but never effected". Only Digby, tried on a separate indictment, pleaded guilty, insisting that the King had reneged upon promises of toleration for Catholics, and that affection for Catesby and love of the Catholic cause mitigated his actions. He sought death by the axe and begged mercy from the King for his young family. His arguments were rebuked by Coke and Northumberland, and along with his seven co-conspirators, he was found guilty by the jury of high treason. Digby shouted "If I may but hear any of your lordships say, you forgive me, I shall go more cheerfully to the gallows." The response was short: "God forgive you, and we do."

Garnet may have been questioned on as many as 23 occasions. His response to the threat of the rack was "Minare ista pueris [Threats are only for boys]", (Note: Haynes (2005) appears to have misspelt this as Minute ista pueris.) and he denied having encouraged Catholics to pray for the success of the "Catholic Cause". His interrogators resorted to the forgery of correspondence between Garnet and other Catholics, but to no avail. His jailers then allowed him to talk with another priest in a neighbouring cell, with eavesdroppers listening. Eventually Garnet let slip a crucial detail, that there was only one man who could testify that he had any knowledge of the plot. Under torture Garnet admitted that he had heard of the plot from fellow Jesuit Oswald Tesimond, who had learnt of it in confession from Catesby. Garnet was charged with high treason and tried in the Guildhall on 28 March from 8 am until 7 pm. According to Coke, Garnet instigated the plot, but Garnet refuted all the charges against him; he was found guilty and sentenced to death.

=== Executions ===
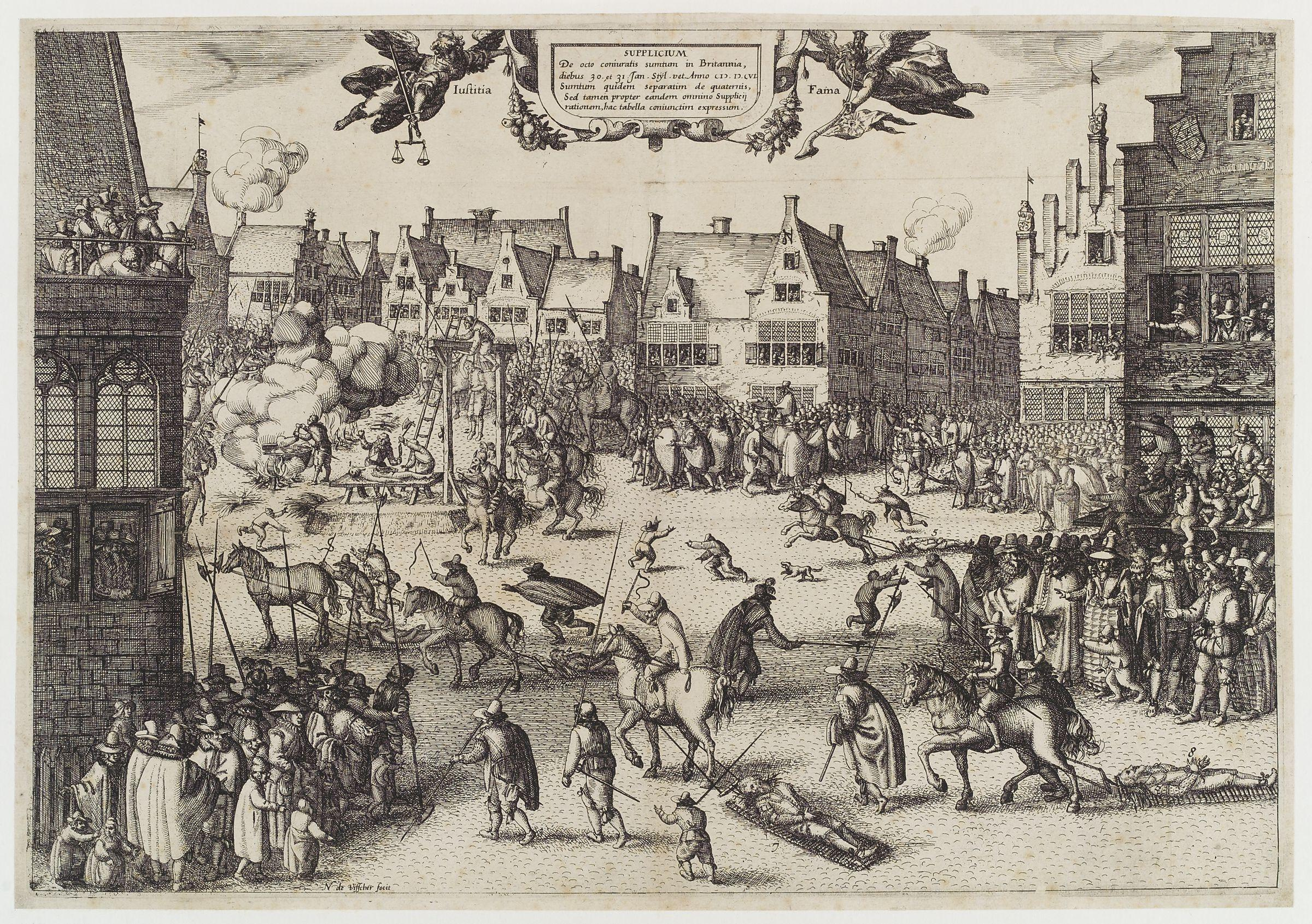
Engraving of conspirators of the Gunpowder Plot being hanged, drawn and quartered in London

Although Catesby and Percy escaped the executioner, their bodies were exhumed and decapitated, and their heads exhibited on spikes outside the House of Lords. On 30 January, Everard Digby, Robert Wintour, John Grant, and Thomas Bates were tied to hurdles—wooden panels—and dragged through the crowded streets of London to St Paul's Churchyard. Digby, the first to mount the scaffold, asked the spectators for forgiveness, and refused a Protestant clergyman. He was stripped of his clothing, and wearing only a shirt, climbed the ladder to place his head through the noose. He was quickly cut down, and while still fully conscious was castrated, disembowelled, and then quartered, along with the three other prisoners. The following day, Thomas Wintour, Ambrose Rookwood, Robert Keyes, and Guy Fawkes were hanged, drawn and quartered, opposite the building they had planned to blow up, in the Old Palace Yard at Westminster. Keyes did not wait for the hangman's command and jumped from the gallows, but he survived the drop and was led to the quartering block. Although weakened by his torture, Fawkes managed to jump from the gallows and break his neck, avoiding the agony of the gruesome latter part of his execution.

Steven Littleton was executed at Stafford. His cousin Humphrey, despite his co-operation, met his end at Red Hill near Worcester. Henry Garnet was executed on 3 May 1606.

== Aftermath ==
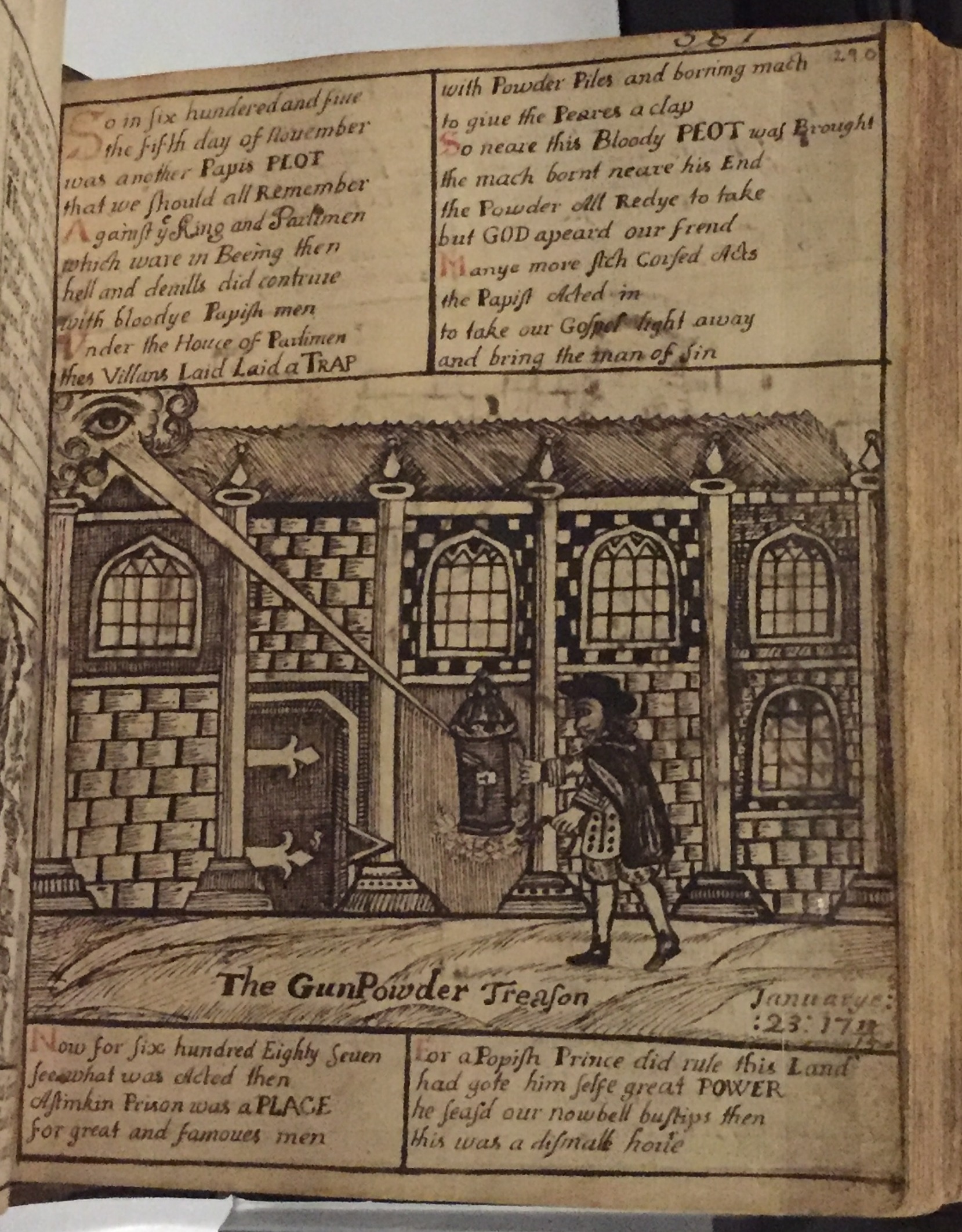
"The Gunpowder Treason" in a Protestant Bible of the 18th century

The discovery of such a wide-ranging conspiracy and the subsequent trials led Parliament to consider new anti-Catholic legislation. The event destroyed all hope that the Spanish would ever secure tolerance of the Catholics in England. In the summer of 1606, laws against recusancy were strengthened; the Popish Recusants Act returned England to the Elizabethan system of fines and restrictions, introduced a sacramental test, and an Oath of Allegiance, requiring Catholics to abjure as a "heresy" the doctrine that "princes excommunicated by the Pope could be deposed or assassinated". Catholic emancipation took another 200 years, but many important and loyal Catholics retained high office during James I's reign. Although there was no "golden time" of "toleration" of Catholics, which Garnet had hoped for, James's reign was nevertheless a period of relative leniency for Catholics.

Faith, here's an equivocator,
that could swear in both the scales against either scale;
who committed treason enough for God's sake,
yet could not equivocate to heaven

— Macbeth, Act 2 Scene 3

The playwright William Shakespeare seems to have featured the events of the Gunpowder Plot alongside the earlier Gowrie conspiracy in Macbeth, written between 1603 and 1607.

Interest in the demonic was heightened by the Gunpowder Plot. The King had become engaged in the great debate about other-worldly powers in writing his Daemonologie in 1599, before he became King of England as well as Scotland. Chiasmi seen in such lines as "fair is foul and foul is fair" are used frequently, and another possible reference to the plot relates to the use of equivocation; Garnet's A Treatise of Equivocation was found on one of the plotters. Poets made a point of describing it as an act so evil that not only was its evil, in John Milton's words, sine nomine in the English language, other neo-Latin poetry described it as (inaudito), unheard of, even among the most wicked nations of history:

Neither the Carthaginians infamous in the name of perfidy nor the cruel Scythian nor Turk or the dreaded Sarmatian, nor the Anthropophagi, nurslings of mad savagery, nor any nation as barbarous in the furthermost regions of the world has heard.

Milton wrote a poem in 1626 that one commentator has called a "critically vexing poem", In Quintum Novembris. Reflecting "partisan public sentiment on an English-Protestant national holiday", in the published editions of 1645 and 1673, the poem is preceded by five epigrams on the subject of the Gunpowder Plot, apparently written by Milton in preparation for the larger work. The plot may also have influenced his later work, Paradise Lost.

In What If the Gunpowder Plot Had Succeeded? historian Ronald Hutton concluded that a successful implementation of the plot would have prompted a severe backlash against suspected Catholics, and that without foreign assistance a successful rebellion would have been unlikely; despite differing religious convictions, most Englishmen were loyal to the monarchy. England might have become a more "Puritan absolute monarchy", as "existed in Sweden, Denmark, Saxony, and Prussia in the seventeenth century", rather than following the path of parliamentary and civil reform that it did.

=== Accusations of state conspiracy ===
Many at the time felt that Salisbury had been involved in the plot to gain favour with the King and enact more stridently anti-Catholic legislation. Such conspiracy theories alleged that Salisbury had either actually invented the plot or allowed it to continue when his agents had already infiltrated it, for the purposes of propaganda. The Popish Plot of 1678 sparked renewed interest in the Gunpowder Plot, resulting in a book by Thomas Barlow, Bishop of Lincoln, which refuted "a bold and groundless surmise that all this was a contrivance of Secretary Cecil".

In 1897 John Gerard of Stonyhurst College, namesake of John Gerard (who, following the plot's discovery, had evaded capture), wrote an account called What was the Gunpowder Plot?, alleging Salisbury's culpability. This prompted a refutation later that year by Samuel Gardiner, who argued that Gerard had gone too far in trying to "wipe away the reproach" which the plot had exacted on generations of English Catholics. Gardiner portrayed Salisbury as guilty of nothing more than opportunism. Subsequent attempts to prove Salisbury's involvement, such as Francis Edwards's 1969 work Guy Fawkes: the real story of the gunpowder plot?, have similarly foundered on the lack of any clear evidence.

The cellars under the Houses of Parliament continued to be leased to private individuals until 1678, when news of the Popish Plot broke. It was then considered prudent to search the cellars on the day before each State Opening of Parliament, a ritual that survives to this day.

=== Bonfire Night ===
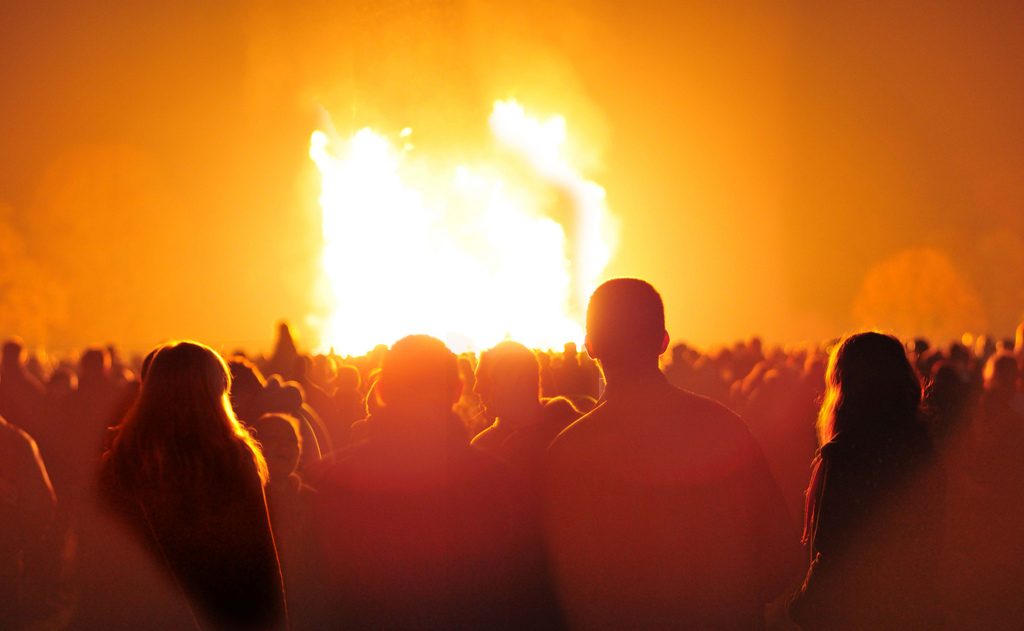
Bonfires are lit in Britain every 5 November to commemorate the failure of the plot.

In January 1606, during the first sitting of Parliament since the plot, the Observance of 5th November Act 1605 was passed, making services commemorating the event an annual feature of English life; the act remained in force until 1859. The tradition of marking the day with the ringing of church bells and bonfires started soon after the Plot's discovery, and fireworks were included in some of the earliest celebrations. In Britain, 5 November is variously called Bonfire Night, Fireworks Night, or Guy Fawkes Night.

5 November firework displays and bonfire parties are common throughout Britain. Traditionally, in the weeks running up to the 5th, children made "guys"—effigies supposedly of Fawkes—usually made from old clothes stuffed with newspaper, and fitted with a grotesque mask, to be burnt on bonfires. These "guys" were exhibited to collect money for fireworks, although this custom has become less common. The word guy, in the 19th century, thus came to mean an oddly dressed person and, in the 20th and 21st centuries, any male person.

Remember, remember,
The Fifth of November,
Gunpowder treason and plot;
For I see no reason
Why Gunpowder Treason
Should ever be forgot.

— Nursery rhyme

According to the biographer Esther Forbes, Guy Fawkes Day in the pre-revolutionary American colonies was a very popular holiday. In Boston, the revelry on "Pope Night" took on anti-authoritarian overtones, and often became so dangerous that many would not venture out of their homes.

=== Reconstructing the explosion ===
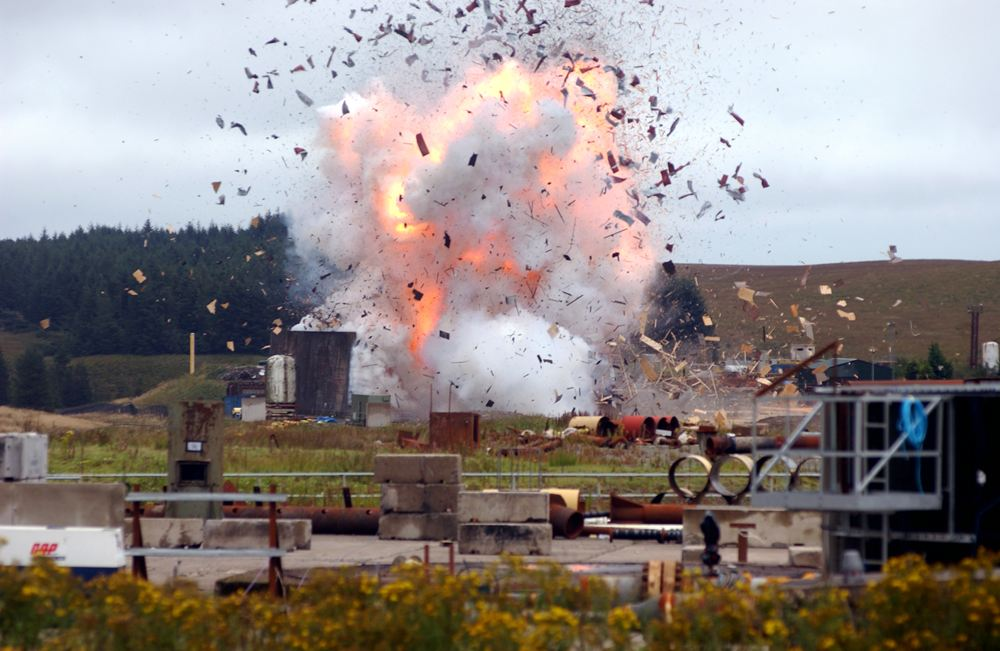
A photograph of the explosion, moments after detonation

In the 2005 ITV programme The Gunpowder Plot: Exploding the Legend, a full-size replica of the House of Lords was built and destroyed with barrels of gunpowder, totalling 1 tonne of explosives. The experiment was conducted on the Advantica-owned Spadeadam test site and demonstrated that the explosion—if the gunpowder had been in good order—would have killed all those in the building. The power of the explosion was such that of the 7-foot (2.1 m) deep concrete walls making up the undercroft (replicating how archives suggest the walls of the old House of Lords were constructed), the end wall where the barrels were placed, under the throne, was reduced to rubble, and the adjacent surviving portions of wall were shoved away. A piece of the head of the dummy representing King James, which had been placed on a throne inside the chamber, was found a considerable distance from its initial location. According to the findings of the programme, no one within 330 feet (100 m) of the blast could have survived, and all of the stained glass windows in Westminster Abbey would have shattered. The explosion would have been seen from miles away and heard from further still. Even if only half of the gunpowder had gone off—which Fawkes was apparently prepared for—everyone in the House of Lords would have been killed instantly.

The programme also disproved claims that deterioration in the quality of the gunpowder would have prevented the explosion. A portion of deliberately deteriorated gunpowder, of such low quality as to make it unusable in firearms, still created a large explosion. The impact of even deteriorated gunpowder would have been magnified by its containment in wooden barrels. The compression would have created a cannon effect, with the powder first blowing up from the top of the barrel before, a millisecond later, blowing out. Calculations showed that Fawkes, who was skilled in the use of gunpowder, had deployed double the amount needed.
