= Thomas Grey, 15th Baron Grey de Wilton =

English aristocrat, soldier and conspirator

Thomas Grey, 15th Baron Grey de Wilton (died 1614) was an English aristocrat, soldier and conspirator. He was convicted of involvement in the Bye Plot against James I of England.

== Early life ==
The son of Arthur Grey, 14th Baron Grey of Wilton, by his second wife Jane Sibella Morison, daughter of Sir Richard Morison, he served in the fleet against the Spanish Armada in 1588. He succeeded his father as Lord Grey of Wilton in 1593, and identified himself with the Puritans.

Grey took part as a volunteer in the Islands Voyage of 1597. He was anxious to command a regiment; when Robert Devereux, 2nd Earl of Essex went to Ireland as Lord Deputy in March 1599, Grey was one of his followers, and received a commission as colonel of horse. Soon after his arrival in Ireland Essex asked him to declare himself his friend only, and to detach himself from Sir Robert Cecil but Grey declined on the ground that he was indebted to Cecil. Henceforth Essex and Essex's friend Henry Wriothesley, 3rd Earl of Southampton treated Grey as an enemy. In a small engagement with the Irish rebels fought in June he charged without directions from Southampton, who was general of horse and his superior officer. He was accordingly committed for one night to the charge of the marshal.

The disgrace rankled in Grey's mind, and in May 1600 he abandoned Essex in Ireland, and with Sir Robert Drury (1575–1615) took a small troop of horse to serve the United Provinces in Flanders. Queen Elizabeth was incensed, but in July Cecil sent Henry Brooke, Lord Cobham and Sir Walter Raleigh to meet him at Ostend, and assure him of the queen's goodwill. This meeting at Ostend brought together for the first (and perhaps only) time Grey, Cobham, and Raleigh, who were afterwards charged with joint complicity in treason. Fighting under Maurice of Nassau, Grey took part in the battle of Nieuport, 2 July 1600, in which the Dutch gained a decisive victory over the Spanish forces under Albert VII, Archduke of Austria; Grey was wounded in the mouth. He sent home an account of the victory two days later.

Grey was again in London early in 1601. In January, the queen warned Grey and Southampton to keep the peace, but Grey assaulted Southampton while on horseback in the street, and was committed to the Fleet Prison; Essex was deeply affronted. Grey was quickly released, and on 8 February 1601 acted as general of the horse in the forces sent out to suppress Essex's rebellion. On 19 February he sat on the commission which tried Essex and Southampton at Westminster, and condemned them to death. When at the opening of the trial his name as commissioner was read out in court by the clerk, Essex, according to an eye-witness, laughed contemptuously and tugged Southampton by the sleeve.

In May 1602 Grey returned to the Low Countries, but he was disappointed by his reception by the Dutch. He attributed his neglect to Sir Francis Vere's jealousy, and came home in October embittered. Early in 1603, Elizabeth made him a grant of lands.

== The Bye Plot ==
On the death of Elizabeth (24 March 1603) Grey attended the hasty meeting of the council, at which it was resolved to support the claim of King James VI of Scotland. He had reservations. A chance meeting with Southampton, who had been released from the Tower of London, in the audience-chamber of Queen Anne of Denmark at Windsor in June 1603, may have intensified his dislike of the new regime. He complained of the Scotsmen crowding to court in search of office.

Grey's friend, George Brooke, Lord Cobham's brother, was similarly discontented, and had fallen in with William Watson, a secular priest, Sir Griffin Markham, and other Catholics. They were plotting to seize the king, and obtain from him promises of religious toleration for Catholics by intimidation. Grey allowed Brooke to introduce him to Markham and his allies and apparently assented to the desirability of forcing a petition for general toleration on James's notice. Grey disliked their religious views, and he later declared that he had contemplated disclosing their plans to the government. Watson imagined that Grey could carry out seizure of the king's person, and that others should be at hand to rescue James from Grey's hands so that they might pose as patriotic Catholics. Before the day (24 June 1603) of the attack arrived Grey refused to take any part in it. By that time the government knew all, and the conspirators fled without attempting anything.

Grey went abroad to Sluys, but he was arrested there in July, and was brought prisoner to the Tower of London (July). When interrogated by the lieutenant of the Tower (3 August), he denied any traitorous intention. Coke drew up an abstract of treasons in which Grey was stated to have engaged in bringing together a hundred gentlemen of quality for the purpose of seizing the king. The plot in which Grey was involved was known as the "Bye plot". Another plot, known as the "Main Plot" had been found out at the same time, with the result that Cobham and Raleigh were arrested soon after Grey, Markham, and their group.

The government then tried to identify the two conspiracies, though Grey was not complicit with Cobham and Raleigh. Nevertheless, Grey and Cobham were tried together at Winchester (18 November) before a court composed of thirty-one peers, presided over by the chancellor. Grey made a spirited defence, which occupied the best part of the day, and referred to the patriotic services of his ancestors. He was condemned to death, and on 10 December he and Cobham and Markham were taken to the scaffold. But after each had made a declaration of innocence, a reprieve was given, and they were taken once again to the Tower of London.

== Later life ==
Grey had declined to beg for his life, but after his return to the Tower, he wrote to thank the king for his clemency, and presented petitions subsequently for his release. He was allowed to correspond with friends, and watched the course of the war in the Low Countries. In 1613, when Frederick V, Elector Palatine, came to England to marry the Princess Elizabeth, he appealed to James to grant Grey's release; James refused the request. Grey is said to have been kept subsequently in more rigorous confinement, on the grounds of a relationship with one of the women attending of Lady Arabella Stuart, a fellow prisoner. He died in the Tower, after eleven years' imprisonment, on 9 July 1614.

== Legacy ==
The Barony of Grey of Wilton became extinct at his death. Of the family estates, Wilton Castle, on the River Wye, had been alienated before the attainder of 1603 to Grey Brydges, 5th Baron Chandos. The confiscated estates of Whaddon were granted to George Villiers, the king's favourite. Many of Grey's papers passed, through his sister Bridget Egerton, to Philip Wharton, 4th Baron Wharton, and thence to Thomas Carte the historian; they went with the Carte MSS. to the Bodleian Library.

Peerage of England
Preceded by Arthur Grey	Baron Grey de Wilton; 1593–1603	Forfeit
