= William Watson (priest) =

English Roman Catholic priest and conspirator

William Watson (c. 23 April 1559 – 9 December 1603) was an English Roman Catholic priest and conspirator, executed for treason.

== Life ==
In 1586 Watson became a Roman Catholic priest in France, and during the concluding years of Elizabeth's reign he paid several visits to England; he was imprisoned and tortured more than once. He became prominent in the Archpriest Controversy as a champion of the secular priests in their dispute with the Jesuits, and in 1601 some writings by him on this question appeared which were answered by Robert Parsons. In September of that year he was resident at Fulham Palace, under the protection of Richard Bancroft.

When Elizabeth died, Watson hastened to Scotland to assure James I of the loyalty of his party, and to forestall the Jesuits, who were suspected of intriguing with Spain. The new king did not, however, as was hoped, cease to exact the fines on recusants; and the general dissatisfaction felt by the Roman Catholics gave rise to the "Bye plot," or "Watson's plot," in which connection this priest's name is best known, and to its sequel the Main Plot; Watson discussed the grievances of his co-religionists with another priest, William Clark, with Sir Griffin Markham and Anthony Copley, and with a disappointed Protestant courtier, George Brooke; they took another Protestant, Thomas Grey, 15th Baron Grey de Wilton, into their confidence, and following Scottish precedents it was arranged that James should be surprised and seized, while they talked loudly about capturing the Tower of London, converting the King to Catholicism, and making Watson Lord Keeper.

One or two of the conspirators drew back; but Watson and his remaining colleagues arranged to assemble at Greenwich on 24 June 1603, and under the pretence of presenting a petition to carry out their object. The plot was a complete failure; Henry Garnet and other Jesuits betrayed it to the authorities, and its principal authors were seized, Watson being captured in August at Hay-on-Wye on the Welsh border. They were tried at Winchester and found guilty; Watson and Clark were executed on 9 December 1603, and Brooke suffered the same fate a week later. Grey and Markham were reprieved.

Before the executions took place, however, the failure of the Bye plot had led to the discovery of the Main plot. Brooke's share in the earlier scheme caused suspicion to fall upon his brother Henry Brooke, 11th Baron Cobham, the ally and brother-in-law of Sir Robert Cecil. Cobham appears to have been in communication with Spain about the possibility of killing "the king and his cubs" and of placing Lady Arabella Stuart on the throne. He was seized, tried and condemned to death, but although led out to the scaffold he was not executed. It was on suspicion of being associated with Cobham in this matter that Sir Walter Raleigh was arrested and tried.

=== Works ===
A list of some of Watson's works follows:

- William Watson (1602). A Decacordon of Ten Quodlibeticall Questions Concerning Religion and State: Wherein the Authour Framing Himselfe a Quidlibet to Euery Quodlibet, Decides an Hundred Crosse Interrogatorie Doubts, about the Generall Contentions betwixt the Seminarie Priests and Iesuits at this Present. [London]: Newly imprinted [by Richard Field]. OCLC 772979078.
