= William Clark (Roman Catholic priest) =

English Roman Catholic priest

William Clark (died 1603) was an English Roman Catholic priest and conspirator. He is remembered for his involvement in a plan to kidnap King James I of England, made together with another Catholic priest William Watson in the Bye Plot. He was executed at Winchester on 29 November 1603.

== Life ==
He received his education at the English College, Douai, where he arrived on 6 August 1587. Two years later he went to the English College, Rome, and was one of a group of eight priests sent from there on the English mission in April 1592.

Clark took an active part in the Archpriest Controversy: he was one of the "appellants", the 33 priests who signed the appeal against George Blackwell dated from Wisbech Castle, 17 November 1600. An attempt was made to give to the first clause of the breve of Pope Clement VIII, in favour of the appellants (5 October 1602), the appearance of restoring to them the canonical faculties which had been recently withdrawn. At this point Clark, with Watson and Thomas Bluet, was to be excluded. As it turned out, this solution to the dispute failed.

In 1602, Clark was an inmate of The Clink prison in Southwark. He and Watson joined with others in what became called the Bye Plot against James I. On being apprehended Clark was committed to the Gatehouse Prison at Westminster, and then moved to the Tower of London. He and most of the other prisoners were then conveyed to Winchester under a strong guard, where they were tried and condemned on 15 November 1603. Other conspirators in the Bye Plot and Main Plot were pardoned; but Sir George Brooks, Clark, and Watson suffered the punishment of traitors at Winchester on 29 November. Sir Dudley Carleton, who was present, wrote: "The two priests that led the way to the execution were very bloodily handled". He added that Clark "stood somewhat upon his justification, and thought he had hard measure; but imputed it to his function, and therefore thought his death meritorious, as a kind of martyrdom".

== Works ==
He wrote A Replie unto a certain Libell latelie set foorth by Fa. Parsons, in the name of the united Priests, intituled, A Manifestation of the great folly and bad spirit of certaine in England calling themselves Secular Priestes, 1603, no place. Reprint Scolar Press, 1972.
