= Bye Plot =

Conspiracy to kidnap James I of England

The Bye Plot of 1603 was a conspiracy, by Roman Catholic priests and Puritans aiming at tolerance for their respective denominations, to kidnap the new English king, James I of England. It is referred to as the "bye" plot, because at the time it was presented as a minor component of a larger plot (the so-called "Main" Plot).

== Background ==
The Anglo-Spanish War had been continuing for nearly two decades, with fighting at sea, in the Netherlands and in Ireland. Elizabeth I of England died at the end of March 1603, and James VI of Scotland claimed the English throne, without overt opposition. In England and Wales, a substantial number of Catholics were subject to fines if they did not attend Church of England services, under a system of Penal Laws. English Catholics protested loyalty to the Crown, and wished the legal constraints on their worship relaxed. They were ministered to by priests, both of the Society of Jesus and other religious orders active in England as a mission, and seminary priests and others not in religious orders (secular priests). The legal position of these priests was unclear.

== Divisions among English Catholics ==
A divisive quarrel and pamphlet war among English Catholics, the Archpriest controversy, had in 1603 been contentious for about five years. The resulting alignment of Catholic priests had a great deal to do with making the plots of 1603 impractical, and also made one side of the argument receptive to the idea of informing the London government.

William Watson took the "appellant" side in the Archpriest Controversy, hostile to George Blackwell who had been appointed by the Holy See. Useful to the English government and church for his polemics, Watson was under the protection of Richard Bancroft, then bishop of London. In September 1601, Watson was resident at Fulham Palace. In 1602 he was confined in The Clink, but kept in close touch with Bancroft.

The plot was initially exposed by the archpriest Blackwell and two Jesuits, John Gerard and Henry Garnet, who were on the other side of the dispute. These three (by independent routes) passed on information they had relating to the conspiracy. They had other reasons besides the ongoing controversy: they feared retribution against Catholics if the plan failed; and entertained suspicions regarding the political motivations of the secular priests.

== The plotters ==
The plot is known also as Watson's Plot, the Catholic Plot, the Surprising Treason, or the Treason of the Priests. Those involved were not in fact exclusively Catholic priests: Thomas Grey, 15th Baron Grey de Wilton was a Puritan layman who became drawn in, though the plot never went farther than far-fetched discussion. Another lay conspirator was Sir Griffin Markham.

While they may have had in common a wish for religious toleration, their motivations were varied. Watson wished to have no more fines for recusancy levied. Another plank in the platform of the Bye Plot was the removal of certain ministers of the king. To the extent that these matters can be clarified, the Main Plot that had been laid in parallel wished also for regime change, with James replaced on the throne by Arbella Stuart.

== Events of 1603 ==
King James moved south at a leisurely pace, having reached Theobalds House in Hertfordshire on 3 May. The scheme, such as it was, depended on Markham's view in May that there was a "Scottish precedent" for seizing the person of the king for political advantage. It was in late May or early June (on Gerard's own account) that someone (probably Markham) tried to recruit the Jesuit John Gerard. Gerard's reaction was negative, and he wrote to Henry Garnet and George Blackwell asking them to put a spoke in the wheels of the plot.

=== June ===
The date set by Watson for the plot to be carried out was 24 June. This was St John Baptist's Day, and a collar day; in the planning of the plot its significance was that courtiers would be at court and regaled ceremonially.

As the date and midsummer approached, Gerard had contacted a Scottish courtier asking that he make the king aware, while also Blackwell, the official head of the English Catholic secular clergy operating from hiding, took roundabout steps. Blackwell's communication outran Gerard's.

Blackwell revealed something of the plot to the government through an intermediary, the recusant John Gage, who had married Margaret, the daughter of Sir Thomas Copley. When Gage wrote to Sir Robert Cecil, on 28 June, Cecil was already aware of plotting. The Catholic returned exile and conspirator Anthony Copley had also written to Blackwell about the Bye Plot; he was Sir Thomas Copley's son and therefore Gage's brother-in-law. Blackwell had written to Gage; Cecil assumed there was something more behind these exchanges, so that he asked Gage to produce Blackwell before the Council. It has been suggested that Copley consciously played the double agent.

In the event, Lord Grey withdrew ahead of the day, and the plotters scattered.

=== July ===
A significant arrest was of Sir George Brooke who was in the Tower of London in July. Markham and Brooke wanted to supplant current members of the Privy Council. Henry Brooke, 11th Baron Cobham was his brother, and a conspirator in the more serious "Main Plot". Sir George was arraigned on 15 July, and in his eagerness to clear himself, made confessions that clarified to the investigators that two separate groups of plotters had been active. On 16 July a proclamation was issued for Watson's arrest. Bancroft at around this time had good reason to distance himself from Watson, and claimed he had not seen him since before the queen died.

King James's coronation went ahead on 25 July, his name day (for James the Greater), as planned. His ceremonial entry into London, however, was postponed until March 1604, for reasons including the plague; at this time Westminster did not form part of London.

=== August ===
Watson was arrested around 5 August in a field by the River Wye near Hay-on-Wye, on the border of England and Wales. He made a confession about the plot, dated 10 August. William Clark, another priest who had been an active organiser, was arrested in Worcester on 13 August.

=== November ===
Further details of the Bye Plot were revealed by the Catholic priest Francis Barnaby, in prison. He was another appellant contact of Bancroft, who communicated for him with Christopher Bagshaw, and had worked with the plotter William Clark against English Jesuits.

The Court had moved to Wilton House, near Salisbury in Wiltshire. There it was decided that trials could conveniently be held at the bishop's palace in Winchester, not very far away. These trials took place 15–18 November. John Lingard in his History of England attributed the delay to the continued presence in the country of Charles de Ligne, 2nd Prince of Arenberg; Arenburg was there to represent the Spanish Netherlands at James's coronation, and the alleged contacts of the Main Plot with him were potentially embarrassing.

On the 15th the two Catholic priests involved, Sir George Brooke and Sir Griffin Markham, and others, were tried. On the 17th Sir Walter Raleigh was tried, and the prosecution managed to make a case that he had been involved in the Bye Plot. Lord Grey as a baron was tried and found guilty by 31 peers, on 18 November, with Lord Cobham who was implicated in the Main Plot.

Guilty verdicts on the conspirators were reached; the only acquittal on a high treason charge among the Bye Plot defendants was Sir Edward Parham. Sir Edward Coke's prosecution case for Raleigh's involvement in the Bye Plot was tenuous and rhetorical, heavy on personal abuse, but Raleigh's role on the periphery of the Main Plot left him with much to explain.

The two priests, Watson and Clark, were executed for their parts in the scheme, on 29 November.

=== December ===
The lay conspirator George Brooke was executed on 5 December. On 10 December Lord Grey with Markham was taken to the scaffold, pardoned, and spent the rest of his life in the Tower of London; Dudley Carleton who witnessed the proceedings, involving also Lord Cobham, took it to be a well-scripted drama of the king's mercy. In particular, Carleton concluded, it was staged for the benefit of Raleigh, who had been caught up in the Bye Plot charges.

== Aftermath ==
By an edict of 22 February 1604, King James ordered all Roman Catholic clergy ("Jesuits, Seminaries and other Priests") to leave his kingdom by 19 March. This edict had been drafted in July 1603 on the discovery of the plots.

Anthony Copley was condemned to death; but he was pardoned on 18 August 1604, having made a full confession on the history of the plot.

== See also ==
- Throckmorton Plot
- Gunpowder Plot
