= A Fig for Fortune =

1596 allegorical poem by Anthony Copley

"A Fig for Fortune" is a 1596 long allegorical poem by the English Catholic writer Anthony Copley written as a parodying response to Edmund Spenser's The Faerie Queene. It intended to reject both Protestant portrayals of English Catholics as inherently disloyal to Queen Elizabeth, as well as hard-line Jesuit calls for Catholics to become martyrs by resisting the Protestant Queen.

== Text ==
Unlike The Faerie Queene, which is written in Spenserian stanzas, A Fig for Fortune is written in the Venus and Adonis stanza: iambic pentameter rhyming ABABCC.

Vested in sable vale, exild from Joy,
I rang'd to seeke out a propitious place
Where I might sit and descant of annoy
And of faire fortune, altered to disgrace,
At last, even in the confines of the night
I did discerne aloofe a sparkling light.

— Stanza 1

== Bibliography ==
- Copley, Anthony (1883). A Fig for Fortune. Manchester: C.E. Simms, for the Spenser Society.
- Shell, Alison (1999). Catholicism, Controversy and the English Literary Imagination, 1558–1660. Cambridge University Press.
