= Henry Brooke, 11th Baron Cobham =

English peer (1564-1618)

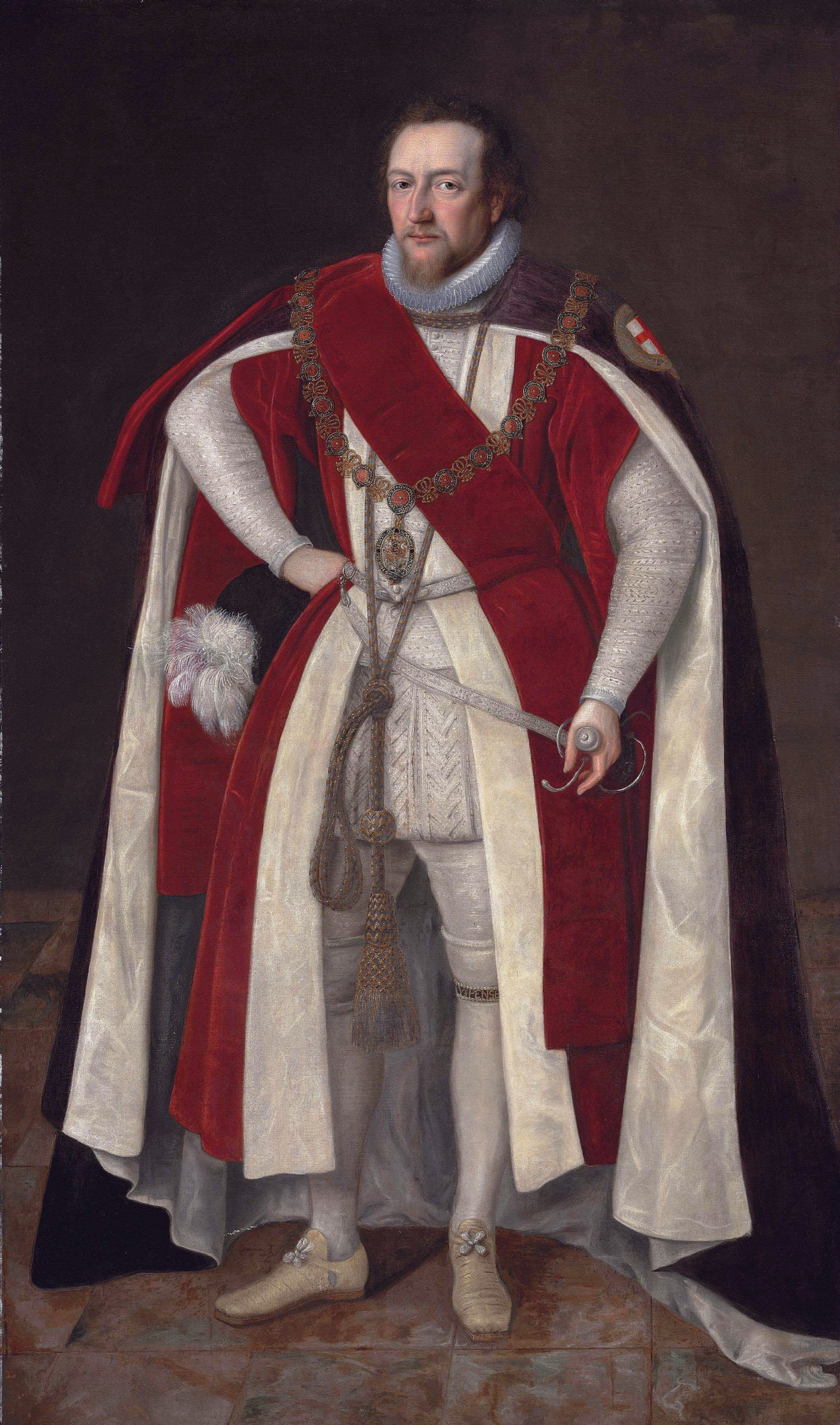
Henry Brooke, 11th Baron Cobham (1564–1618/19) in Garter robes, wearing the chain of the Order of the Garter bearing the pendant of the Greater Saint George (Circle of Paul van Somer)

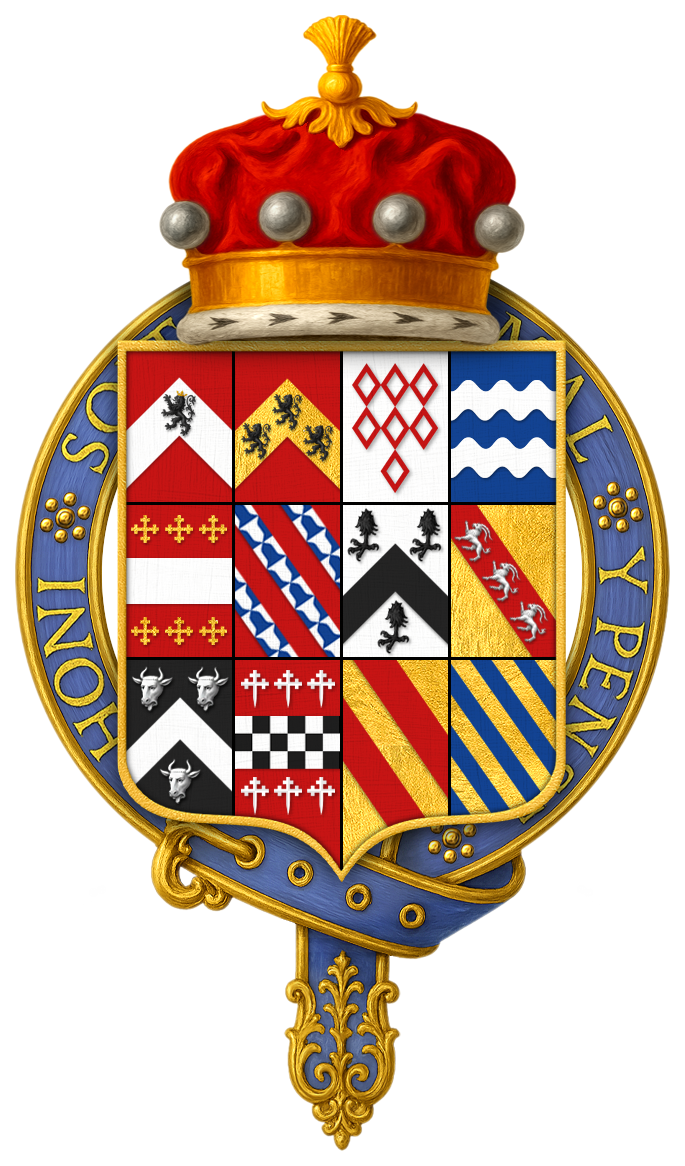
Quartered arms of Sir Henry Brooke, 11th Baron Cobham, KG

Henry Brooke, 11th Baron Cobham (22 November 1564 – 24 January 1618 (Old Style)/3 February 1618 (New Style), lord of the Manor of Cobham, Kent, was an English peer who was implicated in the Main Plot against the rule of James I of England.

== Life ==
The son of William Brooke, 10th Baron Cobham, by second wife Frances, daughter of Sir John Newton, he was educated at King's College, Cambridge. In 1597 he succeeded his father as Lord Warden of the Cinque Ports under Queen Elizabeth I. Shortly after the accession of James I, he was implicated in the "Treason of the Main" in 1603. His brother George was executed, and Henry was imprisoned in the Tower of London by James I, probably in an attempt to obtain the Cobham estates for the Duke of Lennox.

He was the second husband of Lady Frances Howard, daughter of Charles Howard, 1st Earl of Nottingham and Katherine Carey, Countess of Nottingham.

He may have been the subject of a number of Elizabethan satires such as Thomas Nashe's Lenten Stuffe, Ben Jonson's Every Man in his Humour, and may have been the model of William Shakespeare's Falstaff, who was originally given the name "Oldcastle". Sir John Oldcastle shared the same title, Lord Cobham, as Henry Brooke.

Although Falstaff is more likely modelled on his father, William Brooke, 10th Baron Cobham (also descended from John Oldcastle), who was married to Frances Newton, whose family name was originally Caradock; referenced in Henry IV, Part 2 when Falstaff sings The Boy and the Mantle, a ballad in which Sir Caradoc's wife comes away with her fidelity and reputation intact (McKeen 1981).

== Cobham and the Main Plot ==
Contemporary accounts portray Cobham as a good natured but unintelligent man. He opposed the ascension of James I to the throne, along with Thomas Grey, 15th Baron Grey de Wilton. Cobham's dislike of James may have arisen from quarrels over religious policy, but Lord Grey was anti-Catholic. Cobham shows little political activity prior to James's time, and he seems generally to have been an uninvolved peer. His brother, Sir George Brooke, on the other hand, was involved in radical religious politics.

In 1603, the first year of James I's rule, both Brookes were involved in plots against the king. George Brooke entered into the Bye Plot with two Catholic priests, William Watson and William Clark, to kidnap the king and privy council, and force them to ease the political persecution of English Catholics.

At the very same time, Grey and Cobham entered into the Main Plot to raise a regiment of soldiers and force a coup d'etat. Cobham and Grey were to raise one-hundred and sixty thousand pounds (a figure that could be safely multiplied by twenty to convert to contemporary money) to bribe or hire an army. Cobham was to be the go-between with the Princely Count of Arenberg, who would do the actual negotiations with the Spanish court for the money. The conspirators, upon seizing government, would depose James and put Lady Arabella Stuart on the throne in his stead.

It is very likely that none of the offers from the Princely Count Arenberg were in good faith. It is plausible to concede that the Spanish court, already deeply in debt to banks in the Spanish Netherlands and the Dutch Republic, with the failure of the Spanish Armada years before, and having lost many of its galleons to English pirates, was in no position to offer such an astronomical sum to a somewhat improbable enterprise. However, Cobham believed the offers. He spoke with Sir Walter Raleigh about contacting Arenberg, and he was readying to set forth.

However, the Bye plot was discovered through its hireling "swordsmen", and the Bye plot conspirators were imprisoned. George Brooke may have sought to avoid a death sentence by informing on his brother. In any case, he provided information on the Main plot, and Grey, Cobham, and Raleigh were imprisoned in the Tower. During the trial, the evidence was shown to be inconsistent, especially in regard to Raleigh. The Bye plot conspirators were executed in 1603, and the Main plot conspirators were left in the Tower. In 1604 (new style), Cobham's honours in the Knights of the Garter were taken down and expelled.

Cobham, aged and sick, was released from the Tower in 1618, and died shortly after in a "dingy apartment in the Minories".

== Marriage ==
In 1601 he married Frances Howard (c.1572–1628), 2nd daughter of Charles Howard, 1st Earl of Nottingham and widow of Henry FitzGerald, Earl of Kildare. After her husband's attainder in 1603 the king granted her in 1604 a lease for her life of her husband's residence, Cobham Hall in Kent, where she lived "in solitary state" until her death in 1628, having in the meantime taken "no notice whatever of her husband after his trial".

== Sources ==
- McKeen, David (1981). A Memory of Honour: The Life of William Brooke, Lord Cobham V.1 Institut Fur Anglistik und Amerikanistik Universitat Salzburg
- Lex Scripta on the Bye and Main plots

Political offices
Preceded by The Lord Cobham	Lord Warden of the Cinque Ports; 1597–1603	Succeeded by The Earl of Northampton
Preceded by The Lord Cobham	Lord Lieutenant of Kent; 1597–1603	Succeeded by The Lord Wotton
Peerage of England
Preceded by William Brooke	Baron Cobham; 1597–1603	Succeeded by William Brooke (under attainder)
