= Anthony Copley =

English Catholic poet and conspirator

Anthony Copley (1567–1609) was an English Catholic poet and conspirator. He reproached the Jesuits and their meditations on martyrdom, and loyally praised Queen Elizabeth. He is principally known to posterity for his long allegorical poem in 1596 opposing voluntary death, in parody of Book I of The Faerie Queene, entitled A Fig for Fortune; it has been considered a contribution to the same tradition as Hamlet.

== Life ==
He was the third son of Sir Thomas Copley. He was left in England when his father went abroad, but in 1582, while a student at Furnival's Inn, he joined his father and mother at Rouen. He stayed there for two years, and was then sent to the English College, Rome for two years, on a pension of ten crowns from Pope Gregory XIII. He then went to the Low Countries, where he obtained a pension of twenty crowns from Alexander Farnese, Duke of Parma, and entered the service of Philip II of Spain, in which he remained until shortly before 1590.

In 1590 he returned to England without permission, was arrested and put in the Tower of London. He asked for pardon and gave the authorities information on the English Catholic exiles. He lived as a married man at Roffey, Horsham (then spelt variously including Roughay), and on 22 June 1592, in a letter from Richard Topcliffe to the queen, he is described as a bravo. An object of suspicion to the government, and imprisoned several times during the remainder of Elizabeth's reign, his writings were fervently loyal.

On the accession of James I of England, Copley was concerned in the Bye Plot for placing Lady Arabella Stuart on the throne. He and the other conspirators were tried and condemned to death; but Copley was pardoned (18 August 1604), having made a confession relating the history of the plot. In 1606 (1607?) he was a guest in the English College in Rome. The last surviving record of his life portrays him as a pilgrim of the Franciscan Casa Nova in Jerusalem in 1609.

== Works ==
In 1595 he published ‘Wits, Fittes, and Fancies fronted and entermedled with Presidentes of Honour and Wisdom; also Loves Owle, an idle conceited dialogue between Love and an olde Man,’ London, 1595. The prose portion of this work is a collection of jests, stories, and sayings, mainly taken from a Spanish work, ‘La Floresta Spagnola,’ and was reprinted in 1614 with additions, but without ‘Love's Owle’. This work was followed in 1596 by ‘A Fig for Fortune’, reprinted by the Spenser Society in 1883. It is a poem in six-line stanzas; extracts from it were in Thomas Corser's ‘Collectanea,’ ii. 456–9.

At the end of Elizabeth's reign Copley took part in the controversy between the Jesuits and the secular priests, and wrote two pamphlets on the side of the seculars, ‘An Answere to a Letter of a Jesuited Gentleman, by his Cosin, Maister A. C., concerning the Appeale, State, Jesuits,’ 1601. This was followed by ‘Another Letter of Mr. A. C. to his Disjesuited Kinsman concerning the Appeale, State, Jesuits. Also a third Letter of his Apologeticall for himself against the calumnies contained against him in a certain Jesuiticall libell intituled A manifestation of folly and bad spirit,’ 1602; in this he announces ‘my forthcoming Manifestation of the Jesuit's Commonwealth,’ which, however, does not seem to have appeared.
