= Griffin Markham =

Sir Griffin Markham (d. aft. 1644) was an English soldier.

== Life ==
Griffin Markham was the son of Thomas Markham (1530–1607) and of Mary Griffin (1540-ca.1633) of Ollerton, Nottinghamshire. He likely converted to Roman Catholicism early in his life, under the influence of his mother.

On 29 May 1592, he married Anne Roos. Robert Devereux, 2nd Earl of Essex, knighted him in 1591 at the siege of Rouen. During the Nine Years War in Ireland (1594–1603) he commanded the cavalry under Sir Conyers Clifford, and his opportune arrival and counter-charge after the defeat of the infantry at the Battle of Curlew Pass (1599) saved the army from complete disaster. His right arm was broken during the affray.

Markham was banished from court for unknown reasons around 1593. Although he had anticipated the accession of King James I with a degree of hope, after it occurred in March, 1603, he experienced disappointment with the new monarch's lack of favour, and took part in the Bye Plot (June, 1603) and subsequently the Main Plot (July, 1603), for which he was convicted (1603) and sentenced to death. However, he was reprieved from execution and exiled (1605). His properties were given to his cousin, Sir John Harington.

He spent the rest of his life in exile in Europe, acting as a spy for Robert Cecil, and joining the English regiment in the Low Countries; there he fell out with Sir Edmund Baynham, a conspirator in the Gunpowder Plot, and fought a bloody duel with him.
