= Main Plot =

Alleged conspiracy of English courtiers, 1603

The Main Plot was an alleged conspiracy of July 1603 by English courtiers to remove King James I from the English throne and to replace him with his cousin Lady Arbella Stuart. The plot was supposedly led by Lord Cobham and funded by the Spanish government. In a state trial, the defendants accused of involvement in the Main Plot were tried along with those of the Bye Plot. It is referred to as the "main" plot, because at the time it was presented as the principal ("main") plot of which the secondary (or "bye") plot was a minor component.

In the version of the plot presented at trial, Cobham was negotiating with the Count of Aremberg to contact the Spanish court in order to obtain a very large sum of money (approximately £160,000). (Over £22 million in 2025) He was to travel to Brussels, then to Spain, collect the money, and go back to England via Jersey, where Sir Walter Raleigh was governor. Raleigh and Cobham were then to divide up the money and decide how best to spend it in furtherance of sedition.

== Investigation ==
The plot was discovered during an investigation of the Bye Plot in which Sir George Brooke, the brother of Lord Cobham, was implicated. The effort of examining the evidence gathered from suspects questioned in the far-fetched Bye Plot fell to William Waad. He teased out the "main" or serious plot, as he saw it and involving the highly placed Raleigh, from the rest of the "bye" plot; and presented his findings to Sir Robert Cecil and the Privy Council.

== Consequences ==
Cobham and Raleigh were both imprisoned in the Tower of London as was Sir Griffin Markham. Raleigh was released after thirteen years, but was eventually executed in 1618. The sick Cobham was released in the same year, dying some months later.

== See also ==
- Throckmorton Plot
- Gunpowder Plot
