= George Brooke (conspirator) =

English aristocrat and conspirator

The Rev. George Brooke (17 April 1568 – 5 December 1603) was an English aristocrat, executed for his part in two plots against the government of King James I.

== Origins and education ==
Brooke was the fourth and youngest son of William Brooke, 10th Baron Cobham, by second wife Frances, daughter of Sir John Newton, and was born at Cobham Hall, Cobham, Kent, on 17 April 1568 and was baptised with the name of George Cobham. He matriculated at King's College, University of Cambridge, Cambridge, Cambridgeshire, in 1580, and took his M.A. degree in 1586. At the time of his marriage, in 1598 John Chamberlain mentioned that he was lame.

== Career disappointment ==
He obtained a prebend in the prebendary of the church of York, and was later promised the mastership of the Hospital of St Cross, near Winchester, by Queen Elizabeth. The queen, however, died before the vacancy was filled up, and James gave it instead to an agent of his own, James Hudson. This caused Brooke to become disaffected.

== The Bye Plot ==
Brooke and Sir Griffin Markham persuaded themselves that if they could get possession of the royal person they would have it in their power to remove the present members of the council, compel the king to tolerate the Roman Catholics, and secure for themselves the chief employments of the state. As part of their arrangements Brooke was to have been Lord Treasurer. From this scheme sprang the Bye Plot, also known as the 'treason of the priests.'

== The Main Plot ==
To Brooke's connection with the Bye may be ultimately traced the discovery of a second plot, known as the Main Plot, in which Sir Walter Raleigh and Henry Brooke, 11th Baron Cobham were implicated. Brooke being the brother of Cobham, Cecil, who had been married to their sister Elisabeth (who died in 1597), suspected that Cobham and Raleigh might be concerned in the first treason, and by acting at once vigorously he discovered the second plot. Brooke was arrested and sent to the Tower of London for his involvement in the Bye Plot in July 1603; he was arraigned on the 15th. He pleaded not guilty, though his confessions had gradually laid bare the whole details of the plots.

== Execution ==
Brooke appears to have hoped to the last to obtain a pardon by means of Cecil, who had married his sister. He wrote to Cecil enquiring what he might expect after so many promises received, and so much conformity and accepted service performed by him to Cecil. Brooke, in fact, alone of the lay conspirators suffered on the scaffold in the castle yard at Winchester, Hampshire, on 5 December 1603, executed for high treason.

== Private life ==
Brooke married after 17 January 1598/1599 Elizabeth Burgh, daughter of Thomas Burgh, 3rd Baron Burgh and Frances Vaughan, and by her had a son, William, and two daughters, Frances and Elizabeth. Although his children were restored in blood, his son was not allowed to succeed to the title. His widow remarried before 24 October 1605, Francis Reade, son of Sir William Reade of Osterley, Middlesex, and brother of Anne Reade, wife of Sir Michael Stanhope, Knight, of Sudbury, Suffolk.

Thomas Weelkes dedicated a collection of madrigals to Brooke, and Charles Tessier dedicated to him a manuscript collection of French songs. The latter work contains two introductory sonnets by Brooke.
