= Case of Proclamations =

1610 English constitutional law case

- Court: King's Bench
- Decided: Michaelmas Term, 1610
- Citations: [1610] EWHC KB J22; 77 ER 1352; 12 Co Rep 74
- Transcript: Full text on Bailii

Court membership
- Judges sitting: Edward Coke CJ; Thomas Fleming CJ; Lawrence Tanfield CB; James Altham B

Keywords
- Royal prerogative

The Case of Proclamations [1610] EWHC KB J22 is an English constitutional law case during the reign of King James I (1603–1625) which defined some limitations on the royal prerogative at that time. Principally, it established that the monarch could make laws only through Parliament. The judgment began to set out the principle in English law (later developed by future parliaments and other members of the judiciary in subsequent cases, for example Dr. Bonham's Case) that when a case involving an alleged exercise of prerogative power came before the courts, the courts could determine:

- whether the proclaimed prerogative existed in law and how far it extended;
- whether it had been limited by statute, and if so, in what way; and
- whether there was any requirement that the Crown pay compensation after the exercise of the prerogative.

== Facts ==
Tudor monarchs believed that they had the power to regulate, through the issue of royal proclamations, without the consent of Parliament. However, the monarch's absolute power to "make" the law was beginning to be challenged by the English judiciary and was raising concern in Parliament itself. The issue of the King's power to make law came before the judges in 1610 when James I and Parliament were struggling over the issue of impositions. Parliament opposed the King's power to impose further duties on imports over and above what had already been sanctioned by Parliament. James however hoped to use proclamations to raise further money outside of Parliament.

On 20 September 1610, Sir Edward Coke, then Chief Justice of the Common Pleas, was called before the Privy Council of England alongside Lord Chief Justice of the King's Bench Thomas Fleming, Lord Chief Baron Lawrence Tanfield, and Baron James Altham and asked to give a legal opinion as to whether the King, by proclamation, might prohibit new buildings in London, or the making of wheat starch, these having been referred to the King by the House of Commons as grievances and against law. Coke asked for time to consider with other judges, since the questions were "of great importance, and they concerned the answer of the King to the Commons".

== Judgment ==
Coke and his fellow judges ruled that the power of the king to create new offences was outlawed and that the king could not by proclamation prohibit new buildings in and around London; i.e., the royal prerogative could not be extended into areas not previously sanctioned by law:

... the King cannot change any part of the common law, nor create any offence, by his proclamation, which was not an offence before, without parliament.

In giving his judgment, Chief Justice Coke set out the principle that the king had no power to declare new offences by proclamation:

The King has no prerogative but that which the law of the land allows him.

Consequently, the king had no power by which to arbitrarily, through royal proclamations, prohibit the erection of new buildings in London, nor the making of wheat starch without the consent of Parliament, because this power had not previously been granted by Parliament to the king by the making of statute law.

== Significance ==
James I did not concede that he could not rule by prerogative and attempted to place all of his proclamations on a constitutional footing, having them published in a book as if they were statutes. He went to argue that proclamations were necessary to "apply speedy, proper, and convenient remedies ... in matters so variable and irregular in their nature, as are not provided for by Law, nor can fitly fall under the certain rule of a law".

=== 17th century ===
In future English history, the issue of proclamations would form part of the many grievances and issues in dispute between both James I and Charles I and their parliaments before the English Civil War. MPs would go on to cite Coke's judgment in the Case of Proclamations to support their arguments against the arbitrary use of royal power in the years up to 1641. Whilst disputed, the case is seen by some historians and jurists as influential in the development of the concept of judicial review in English common law. However, the issue about the extent of the royal prerogative was not properly resolved until the Bill of Rights 1689 "established that the powers of the Crown were subject to law, and there were no powers of the Crown which could not be taken away or controlled by statute".

=== Exiting the European Union ===
Over 400 years on, the Case of Proclamations continues to affect the constitutional law of the UK. It was cited in 2017 by a divisional court of the High Court in its landmark judicial review decision, R (Miller) v Secretary of State for Exiting the European Union, concerning whether the UK government had the power, under the Crown's foreign affairs prerogative, to serve a notice triggering Brexit following the "leave" vote in the 2016 EU Referendum. The divisional court cited two principles from the Case of Proclamations:

- that "the King by his proclamation or other ways cannot change any part of the common law, or statute law, or the customs of the realm"; and
- that "the King hath no prerogative, but that which the law of the land allows him".

The divisional court unanimously rejected the government's argument in robust terms (which were subsequently upheld 8-3 (Neuberger, Hale, Mance, Kerr, Clarke, Sumption, Wilson, Hodge) by an 11-justice panel (Reed, Carnwath and Hughes dissenting) of the Supreme Court). The court concluded that the government did not have the right to rely on royal prerogative to serve a notice pursuant to Article 50 of the Treaty on European Union, triggering the formal process for the UK to leave the EU. The court added that, because Brexit would directly affect substantive legal rights under UK domestic law, only Parliament could decide whether to serve such a notice.

=== Prorogation of Parliament ===
The Case of Proclamations was again cited in the 2019 Supreme Court case R (Miller) v The Prime Minister and Cherry v Advocate General for Scotland.

== See also ==
- United Kingdom constitutional law
- Case of Prohibitions
- Case of Impositions
- Dr. Bonham's Case
