= Dr. Bonham's Case =

Case decided in 1610 in England

- Court: Court of Common Pleas
- Full case name: Thomas Bonham v College of Physicians
- Decided: Winter 1610
- Citations: 8 Co. Rep. 107; 77 Eng. Rep. 638

Court membership
- Judges sitting: Coke CJ; Warburton J Daniel J Foster J Walmisley J

Case opinions
- Coke CJ (Daniel and Warburton assenting); Walmisley J (Foster assenting)

Keywords
- Parliamentary sovereignty, judicial review

Thomas Bonham v College of Physicians, commonly known as Dr. Bonham's Case or simply Bonham's Case, was a case decided in 1610 by the Court of Common Pleas in England, under Sir Edward Coke, the court's Chief Justice, in which it was ruled that Dr. Bonham had been wrongfully imprisoned by the College of Physicians for practising medicine without a licence. Dr. Bonham's attorneys had argued that imprisonment was reserved for malpractice, not illicit practice, with Coke agreeing in the majority opinion.

The case is notable because Coke argued in the decision's rationale that "in many cases, the common law will control Acts of Parliament", the act of Parliament in question being the College of Physicians Act 1553 (1 Mar. Sess. 2. c. 9), which gave the college the right to imprison. The meaning of this phrase has been disputed over the years. According to one interpretation, Coke intended the kind of judicial review that would later develop in the United States, but other scholars believe that Coke meant only to construe a statute, not to challenge parliamentary sovereignty. If Coke intended the former, he may have later changed his view. The statement by Coke is sometimes considered to be an obiter dictum (a statement made 'by the way'), rather than part of the ratio decidendi (rationale for the decision) of the case.

After an initial period during which Coke's controversial view enjoyed some support but no statutes were declared void, Bonham's Case was thrown aside as a precedent, in favour of the growing doctrine of parliamentary sovereignty. William Blackstone, one of the most prominent supporters of the doctrine, argued that Parliament is the sovereign lawmaker, preventing the common law courts from throwing aside or reviewing statutes in the fashion that Coke had suggested. Parliamentary sovereignty is now the accepted judicial doctrine in the legal system of England and Wales.

Bonham's Case was met with mixed reactions at the time, with King James I and his Lord Chancellor, Lord Ellesmere, both deeply unhappy with it. In 1613 Coke was removed from the Common Pleas and sent to the King's Bench. He was suspended from duties in 1616 and in October 1617 James I demanded an explanation from Coke for this case, with Coke affirming the validity of his reasoning. Academics in the 19th and the 20th centuries have been scarcely more favourable and called it "a foolish doctrine alleged to have been laid down extra-judicially" and simply an "abortion". In the United States, Coke's decision met with a better reaction. During the legal and public campaigns against the writs of assistance and the Stamp Act 1765, Bonham's Case was used as a justification for nullifying the legislation, but by 1772, Blackstone's views had gained acceptance. The 1803 case Marbury v. Madison formed the basis for the exercise of judicial review in the United States, under Article III of the US Constitution, with the case having both parallels and important differences with Dr Bonham's case. Academics have used this connection to argue that Coke's views form the basis of judicial review in the United States, but there is no consensus on the issue.

== Background ==
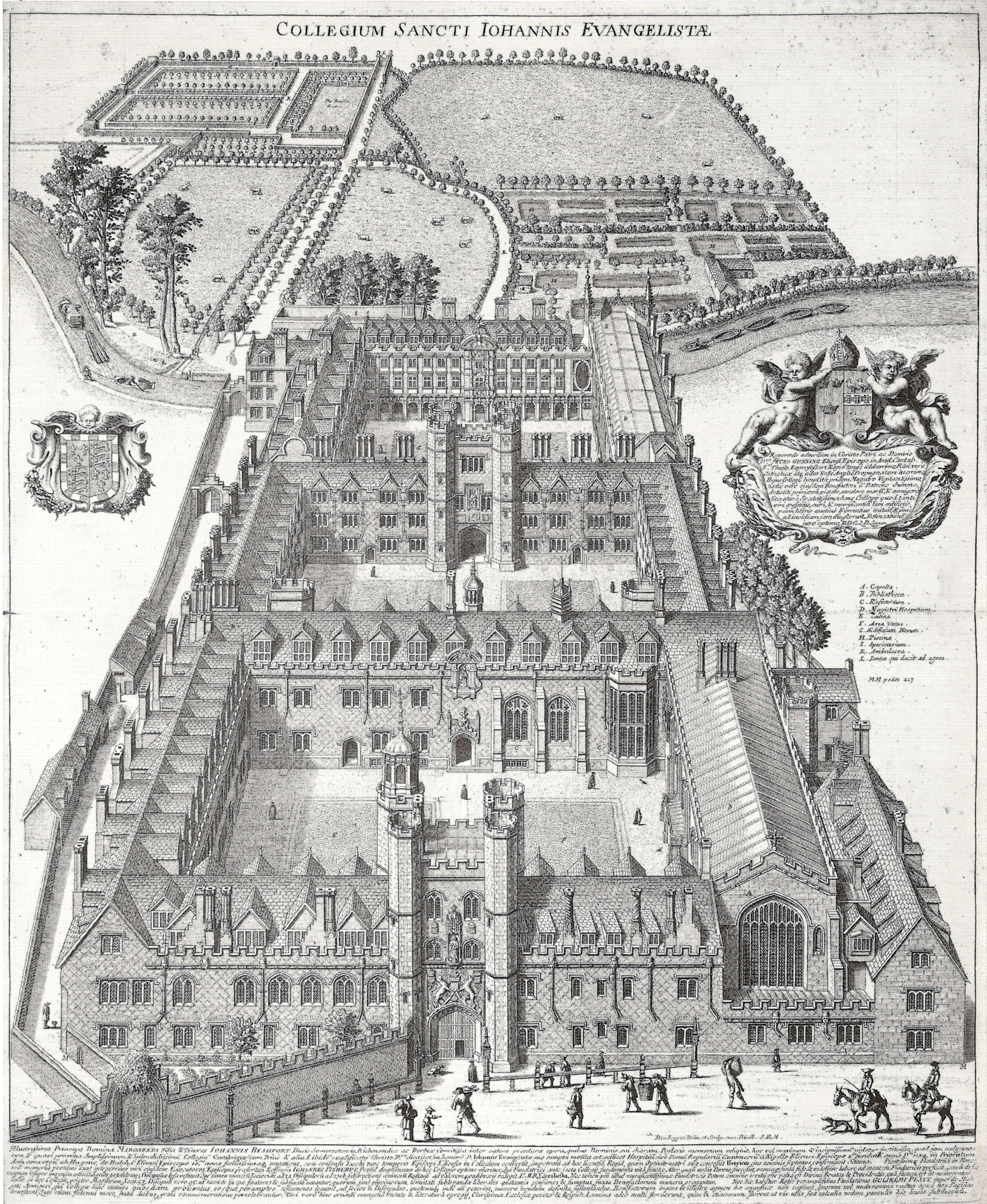
A picture of St John's College, Cambridge, where Bonham studied, from around 1685

The College of Physicians (renamed in 1674 to the Royal College of Physicians) was an elite organisation. Created by royal charter in 1518, it was founded by six English academic doctors trained in English universities. It admitted only British men who had trained at a university and passed a three-part Latin exam in medical theory. Only 24 Fellows were allowed, and if an entrant came at a time when all 24 Fellowships were full, he would instead become a Candidate, the most senior Candidate being admitted to the first vacant Fellowship. An act of Parliament, the Physicians Act 1523, that confirmed the royal charter also gave the college the ability to act as a court to judge other practitioners and to punish those who were acting badly or practising without a licence. A second act, the College of Physicians Act 1553, amended the charter and gave the college the right to imprison indefinitely those judged. That "flew in the face of the common law assumption that to practice medicine one needed only the consent of the patient". Still, on 8 April 1602, John Popham, the Chief Justice, upheld the college's authority to imprison and fine: "That no man, though never so learned a Position, or doctor may Practise in London, or within seven myles, without the College License. ... That a free man of London, may lawfully be imprisoned by the College".

Thomas Bonham had been admitted to St John's College, Cambridge, in 1581. Earning a bachelor's degree in 1584, he completed a master's by 1588 and studied for a medical doctorate at Cambridge, which was later granted by the University of Oxford. By 1602, he had completed his studies and moved to London, where he practised medicine and associated himself with the Barber-Surgeons' Company, campaigning for it to be allowed to authorise medical practitioners in a similar way to the College of Physicians. Apparently giving up after a failed petition to Parliament in 1605, Bonham petitioned to join the college on 6 December 1605 but was rejected and told to return after further study. Returning on 14 April 1606, he was again told he could not join and was fined £5 (equivalent to £1,300 in 2025) and threatened with imprisonment for continuing to practise. Bonham still kept working as a doctor; on 3 October it was announced he was to be arrested and fined £10. Bonham again appeared before the college, now with a lawyer, on 7 November. He announced that he would continue to practise without seeking the college's permission, which he claimed had no power over graduates of Oxford or Cambridge. He was then imprisoned (some say at Fleet Prison, and some say at Newgate Prison) for contempt, but his lawyer had a writ of habeas corpus, issued by the Court of Common Pleas, which freed him on 13 November.

Bonham's successful writ worried the college, whose previous success with Popham and "keen cultivation" of same as well as Lord Ellesmere and other Crown officials had left them assured that their jurisdiction would be maintained. As such, the college appealed directly to the Crown officers, and on 1 May 1607, it met with a committee of judges at Ellesmere's house. The committee were Ellesmere, Popham, Thomas Fleming, two judges from the Court of Common Pleas and two from the Court of King's Bench. The judges all agreed that "for not well doing using or practicing the facultie or arte of physike or for disobedience or contempte donne and committed against any ordinance made by the College ... they may committ the offenders without bayle or mayne price". That success spurred the college to move against Bonham yet again, now by suing him in the King's Bench for £60 (equivalent to £15,300 in 2025) for maintaining an illicit practice. In a counterattack, Bonham brought a suit in the Common Pleas, requesting £100 (£25,500) damages, and alleging that they had trespassed against his person and wrongfully imprisoned him "against the law and custom of this kingdom of England".

== Case ==
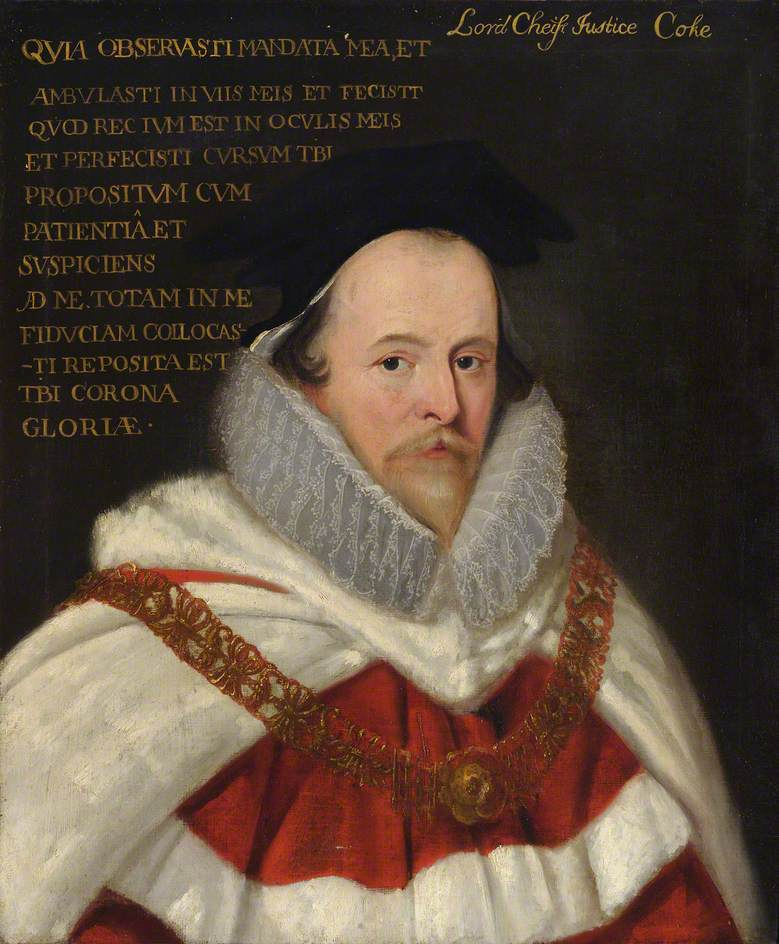
Sir Edward Coke, the Chief Justice of the Common Pleas who decided in favour of Bonham

The case was heard in the Court of Common Pleas by Warburton J, Daniel J, Foster J, Walmisley J and the Chief Justice Sir Edward Coke, with a decision finally reached in the winter of 1610. The college's lawyers had argued that the two acts of Parliament and the royal charter "intends, that none shall practise here but those who are most learned and expert, more than ordinary". As such, the college was free to punish for both practising without a licence and for malpractice, with the 1553 act giving them the authority to imprison those they judged. Bonham's lawyers replied by arguing that the acts and charter were intended to prevent malpractice, not practising without a licence.

Moreover, Bonham's study "[in the texts at university] is practise [sic]", and to become a doctor means to be considered capable of teaching: "when a man brings with him the ensign of doctrine, there is no reason that he should be examined again, for then if thou will not allow of him, he shall not be allowed, though he is a learned and grave man, and it is not the intent of the King to make a monopoly of this practise". As such, the act "doth not inhibit a doctor to practice [sic], but [only] punisheth him for ill using, exercising, and making [of physic]". In other words, it covered malpractice, not illicit practice.

Walmisley and Foster sided with the college, with Walmisley delivering the joint opinion. He said that since the statute clearly said "no person" could practise without the college's licence, only one verdict was acceptable, as the college had a valid licensing authority. The royal charter was to be interpreted as granting the college a duty on behalf of the king:

It is the office of a King to survey his subjects, and he is a physician to cure their maladies, and to remove leprosies amongst them, and also to remove all fumes and smells, which may offend or be prejudicial to their health ... and so if a man be not right in his wits, the King is to have the protection and government of him, lest he being infirm, waste or consume his lands or goods; and it is not sufficient for him that his subjects live, but that they should live happily; and [he] discharges not his office, if his subjects live a life, but [only] if they live and flourish; and he hath cure as well of their bodies as of their lands and goods for health for the body is as necessary as virtue to the mind.

As such, in Walmisley's mind, the king had a duty to protect the health of his subjects and had delegated it to the college. In addition, Bonham had given "an absurd and contemptuous answer" when he claimed that he would not submit to the college, and "it should be a vain law if it did not provide punishment for them that offend against that". The king had delegated part of his prerogative powers to the college, for the purposes of punishment and imprisonment, and as such, it had the right to sit as a court.

Coke delivered the majority opinion in favour of Bonham, with Daniel and Warburton agreeing. He undertook a closer reading of the college's charter and associated acts and divided the relevant passage into two clauses. One gave the power to fine practitioners without licences. The latter specified that they could imprison a practitioner for "not well doing, using or practicing physic". He argued that they constituted separate powers and issues; the former dealt with authorisation to punish for illicit practise, and the other covered punishment for malpractice. Simply practising without a licence did not constitute malpractice. As such, the college did not have the power to imprison Bonham, who was accused of practising without a licence, not of practising dangerously.

Coke also went further by arguing against the validity of the charter and its associated acts, which gave the college the right to act as both as a judge and as a party to a case, which "provided for an absurdity":

One cannot be Judge and attorney for any of the parties. ... And it appears in our books, that in many cases, the common law will control Acts of Parliament, and sometimes adjudge them to be utterly void; for when an act of Parliament is against common right and reason, or repugnant, or impossible to be performed, the common law will control it, and adjudge such an Act to be void; and, therefore in ... Thomas Tregor's case ... Herle saith, some statutes are made against law and right, which those who made them perceiving would not put them in execution.

Because of that and four other reasons given by Coke, the college was to stop trying to supervise medical practice, arbitrating and acting as a court. In support of his judgment, Coke cited not only Tregor's Case but also two anonymous cases with the academic names of Cessavit 42 and Annuitie 11, respectively.

== Criticism ==
The decision in Bonham's Case has been described by John Campbell (Lord Chief Justice and Lord Chancellor in the 19th century) as "a foolish doctrine alleged to have been laid down extra-judicially". Philip Allott, in the Cambridge Law Journal, simply called it an "abortion". Coke was later dismissed from his judicial posts, and Ellesmere immediately began making veiled criticisms, maintaining that it was unconscionable to allow the judges power to throw aside Acts of Parliament if they were repugnant or contrary to reason; however, he spoke "not of impossibilities or direct repugnancies". It was acceptable to overturn an Act if it was clearly and obviously repugnant but not otherwise.

Coke has come under criticism for his examples to justify his decision. The first case that he gave, Tregor's Case, was seriously misquoted. Coke stated, "Herle said some statutes are made against law and right, which those who made them perceiving, would not put into execution". In fact, there is no reference to "law and right" is found in the original text; Herle wrote that "there are some statutes made which he himself who made them does not will to put into execution", meaning only that some statutes are poorly drafted, and if they cannot be interpreted to work, Parliament would accept the courts not applying them. Theodore Plucknett wrote, "Whoever reads the whole of Herle's remarks can see that he did not regard the statute then under discussion as falling within this category; on the contrary, he suggested a perfectly obvious and straightforward interpretation of it. ... Coke's first authority is far from convincing".

His second authority, Cessavit 42, "goes much further to support his thesis" and concerns a situation in which William Bereford refused to apply an Act of Parliament because it would undermine several common law principles. However, Plucknett notes the distinction that in Cessavit 42, "the statute is not held void; it is just ignored. To this fact Coke has really added an explanation and a theory of his own".

His third example, Annuitie 11, was based on the Statute of Carlisle, which required all religious orders to have seals, placed in the custody of the prior and four of the "worthiest brethren" so that the Abbot could not use it without their knowledge. Any decisions made without the seal kept in that fashion were invalid. That clashed with church law and was incredibly difficult for small religious orders; as such, Sir Anthony Fitzherbert said that the statute was void, as it was "impertinent" or "impossible". However, Plucknett again casts doubt on the example's validity by stating that it "would have looked strong ... [but] is, in fact, of doubtful import".

Bonham's Case was deeply unpopular with the Crown; Coke was removed from the Common Pleas and sent to the King's Bench, in theory a more senior office but in practice a less rewarding one in 1613. In June 1616, he was suspended from office and ordered to "correct" his case reports. In October 1617, James I demanded an explanation from Coke of the reasoning behind Bonham's Case. Coke claimed that "the words of my report do not import any new opinion, but only a relation of such authorities of law, as had been adjudged and resolved in former times, and were cited in the argument of Bonham's case". He refused to admit to any flaws with his writings, and his only corrections were minor errors and rearrangements of the language. If he was led from this case to a general support of judicial review instead of Parliamentary sovereignty, it has been argued that his latter writings show that he does not take such a stance.

== Interpretation ==
The decision has been variously interpreted. It can be construed as marking the supremacy of the common law over Parliament by judicial review or only as being another form of statutory interpretation. Noah Feldman suggested that the dispute over the two meanings has its origins in 1930s America, where frustration over judicial review of elements of the New Deal spilled into the academic world. James Kent, in his Commentaries on American Law, argued that Bonham's Case and similar cases meant only that statutes should be given a "reasonable construction". Charles Gray, in the Proceedings of the American Philosophical Society, argues that Coke, as a judge, never intended to advocate the judicial review of statutes. Bernard Bailyn wrote that "Coke had not meant ... 'that there were superior principles of right and justice which Acts of Parliament might not contravene'" and also that by "saying that courts might 'void' a legislative provision that violated the constitution he meant only that the courts were to construe statutes so as to bring them into conformity with recognized legal principles".

William Searle Holdsworth agreed that it would be a mistake to view isolated statements by Coke in Bonham's Case as endorsing limitations upon Parliament; Coke himself elsewhere acknowledged the power of Parliament as being "so transcendent and absolute that it cannot be confined either for causes or persons within any bounds".

Raoul Berger, in the University of Pennsylvania Law Review, disagrees; the words of the statute were clear, and the only application that it could have was unjust. Statutory interpretation allows for the ignoring of unjust extraneous meanings, but what Coke did was nullify the statute as a whole, along with its main intention. John V. Orth, writing in the Constitutional Commentary, concurs: "If that were so, why did they not say so? Is it likely that the royal judges, confronting a case involving a statute that had necessarily passed both houses of parliament and received the royal assent, would lightly use the word 'void'?"

Research by Samuel Thomas and Sir John Baker has led to a reassessment. During the early 17th century, non-common law courts were claiming an "[i]mperial, almost legislative discretion over statutory interpretation, free from any supervisory jurisdiction of the common law courts". Coke's decision can, therefore, be seen as him reminding such courts that their interpretations were subject to the law, not to individual discretion.

== Later impact ==
=== England ===
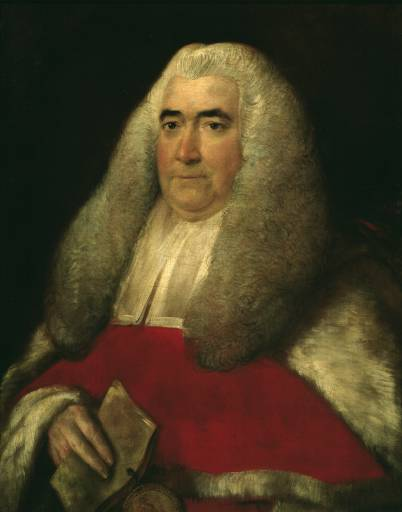
William Blackstone's comments in the Commentaries on the Laws of England saw parliamentary sovereignty overtake Coke's doctrine.

During Coke's lifetime, he was judicially dominant, and his ideas were upheld by his successor as Chief Justice, Sir Henry Hobart, in Day v Savadge and Lord Sheffield v Ratcliffe. After Coke's death, however, his jurisprudence "naturally suffered an eclipse", and its next appearance is in Godden v Hales, in 1686, where the doctrine was twisted to argue that the Crown had the prerogative to dismiss government laws. Plucknett notes that "the Revolution of 1688 marks the abandonment of the doctrine of Bonham's Case", but in 1701, the common law judges cited Coke's decision with approval in City of London v Wood, with John Holt concluding that Coke's statement is "a very reasonable and true saying". His position was to treat statutes in the same way as other documents for the purpose of judicial review and was followed for decades. Outside the judiciary, John Lilburne used Bonham's Case in his book The Legall Fundamentall Liberties of the People of England and then in his 1649 treason trial to justify his attack on the Rump Parliament.

With the growth of the doctrine of parliamentary sovereignty, Coke's theory gradually died out; William Blackstone, in the first edition of his Commentaries on the Laws of England, wrote that "if the parliament will positively enact a thing to be done which is unreasonable, I know of no power that can control it: and the examples alleged in support of this sense of the rule do none of them prove, that where the main object of a statute is unreasonable the judges are at liberty to reject it; for that were to set the judicial power above that of the legislature, which would be subversive of all government". Parliamentary sovereignty is now upheld by the English judiciary as a "central principle of British constitutionalism". Therefore the case saw significant decline, such that Philip Hamburger wrote in 2008, "Bonham's Case scarcely deserves mention in a history of judicial duty, except for reasons that are now largely forgotten".

=== In America ===
In the Thirteen Colonies, there were instances of Coke's statement being interpreted to mean that the common law was superior to statute. For example, drawing on Coke's statement, James Otis, Jr., declared during the struggle over writs of assistance that courts had to ignore Acts of Parliament "against the constitution and against natural equity", which had a significant impact on John Adams. When the Stamp Act 1765 was declared invalid by the Massachusetts Assembly, the rationale was that it was "against Magna Charta and the natural rights of Englishmen, and therefore, according to the Lord Coke, null and void". By 1772, Otis and others had reversed course by adopting Blackstone's position that judges cannot challenge Acts of Parliament. Even before then, Dr. Bonham's Case had rarely been used as a rallying cry in America; judicial review in America grew primarily from other political and intellectual sources.

In Marbury v. Madison (1803), the case that forms the basis for the exercise of judicial review in the United States, Chief Justice John Marshall stated that "the particular phraseology of the Constitution of the United States confirms and strengthens the principle, supposed to be essential to all written constitutions, that a law repugnant to the constitution is void, and that courts, as well as other departments, are bound by that instrument". Marshall specifically used the words "void" and "repugnant", which has been characterised as a deliberate reference to Coke, but Marshall's principle involved repugnancy to the written Constitution, instead of repugnancy to reason. In Hurtado v. California (1884), the US Supreme Court discussed Bonham's Case specifically by saying that it had not affected the omnipotence of parliament over the common law.

Edward Samuel Corwin, writing in the Harvard Law Review, praised the idea of a fundamental higher law of reason enforceable by judges and so endorsed "the ratification which Coke's doctrine received in American constitutional law and theory". Gary McDowell, writing in The Review of Politics, called the case's influence "one of the most enduring myths of American constitutional law and theory, to say nothing of history". McDowell pointed out that it was never discussed during the 1786 Constitutional Convention. During the ratification conventions, despite Coke being mentioned, it was not during debates over the striking down of unconstitutional statutes. Also, other writings of Coke were brought up but never Bonham's Case itself. An additional point of view is that the US Supreme Court has come "full circle to the dictum in Bonham's Case" by using the Due Process Clause to strike down what the Court deems "unreasonable" legislation.

== See also ==
- Wednesbury unreasonableness
- Case of Prohibitions
- Case of Proclamations
- Case of Impositions

== Sources ==
- Allott, Philip (1990). "Parliamentary Sovereignty. From Austin to Hart". The Cambridge Law Journal. 49 (3). Cambridge University Press: 377–380. doi:10.1017/S0008197300122135. ISSN 0008-1973.
- Berger, Raoul (1969). "Doctor Bonham's Case: Statutory Construction or Constitutional Theory?". University of Pennsylvania Law Review. 117 (4). Pennsylvania Law Review. doi:10.2307/3310864. ISSN 0041-9907. JSTOR 3310864. Archived from the original on 8 October 2014.
- Bowen, Catherine Drinker (1957). The Lion and the Throne. Hamish Hamilton. OCLC 398917.
- Conklin, William (1979). In defence of Fundamental Rights. Martinus Nijhof Publishers. ISBN 90-286-0389-1.
- Cook, Harold J. (2004). "Against Common Right and Reason: The College of Physicians v Dr Thomas Bonham". In Boyer, Allen D (ed.). Law, Liberty, and Parliament: Selected Essays on the Writings of Sir Edward Coke. Indianapolis: Liberty Fund. ISBN 0-86597-426-8.
- Corwin, Edward S. (1929). "The "Higher Law" Background of American Constitutional Law". Harvard Law Review. 42 (3). Harvard Law Review Association. doi:10.2307/1330694. ISSN 0017-811X. JSTOR 1330694.
- Edlin, Douglas (2008). Judges and unjust laws: common law constitutionalism and the foundations of judicial review. University of Michigan Press. ISBN 978-0-472-11662-1.
- Elliott, Mark (2004). "United Kingdom: Parliamentary sovereignty under pressure". International Journal of Constitutional Law. 2 (1): 545–627. doi:10.1093/icon/2.3.545. ISSN 1474-2659.
- Feldman, Noah (2004). "The Voidness of Repugnant Statutes: Another Look at the Meaning of Marbury". Proceedings of the American Philosophical Society. 148 (1). ISSN 0003-049X.
- Gough, John (1985). Fundamental law in English constitutional history. Wm. S. Hein Publishing. ISBN 0-8377-2205-5.
- Gray, Charles M. (1972). "Bonham's Case Reviewed". Proceedings of the American Philosophical Society. 116 (1). American Philosophical Society. ISSN 0003-049X.
- Hamburger, Philip (2008). Law and judicial duty. Harvard University Press. ISBN 978-0-674-03131-9.
- Holdsworth, William (January 1912). "Central Courts of Law and Representative Assemblies in the Sixteenth Century". Columbia Law Review. 12: 1, 28-29. Reprinted in Holdsworth, William (1946). Essays in Law and History. Clarendon Press. pp. 37, 66-67.
- Kramer, Larry (2006). The people themselves: popular constitutionalism and judicial review. Oxford University Press. ISBN 0-19-530645-7.
- Martin, Francisco (2007). The constitution as treaty: the international legal constructionalist approach to the U.S. Constitution. Cambridge University Press. ISBN 978-0-521-88193-7.
- McDowell, Gary L. (1993). "Coke, Corwin and the Constitution: The 'Higher Law Background' Reconsidered". The Review of Politics. 55 (3). Cambridge University Press: 393–420. doi:10.1017/s0034670500017605. ISSN 0034-6705.
- Morris, Richard B. (1940). "Judicial Supremacy and the Inferior Courts in the American Colonies". Political Science Quarterly. 55 (3). Academy of Political Science. doi:10.2307/2144098. JSTOR 2144098.
- Orth, John V. (1999). "Did Sir Edward Coke Mean What He Said?". Constitutional Commentary. 16 (1). University of Minnesota Law School. ISSN 0742-7115.
- Parkin-Speer, Diane (1983). "John Lilburne: A Revolutionary Interprets Statutes and Common Law Due Process". Law and History Review. 1 (2). American Society of Legal History. doi:10.2307/743853. ISSN 0738-2480. JSTOR 743853.
- Plucknett, Theodore F. T. (2004). "Bonham's Case and Judicial Review". In Boyer, Allen D (ed.). Law, Liberty, and Parliament: Selected Essays on the Writings of Sir Edward Coke. Indianapolis: Liberty Fund. ISBN 0-86597-426-8.
- Pollard, David (2007). Constitutional and administrative law: text with materials. Oxford University Press. ISBN 978-0-19-928637-9.
- Schwartz, Bernard (1968). Commentary on the Constitution of the United States. MacMillan. ISBN 0-8377-1108-8.
- Taylor, Hannis (1917). Due Process of Law and the Equal Protection of the Laws. Chicago: Callaghan and Company. ISBN 1-15065-962-9. LCCN 17025307.
- Williams, Ian (2006). "Dr Bonham's Case and 'void' statutes". Journal of Legal History. 27 (2). Routledge: 111–128. doi:10.1080/01440360600831154. ISSN 0144-0365.
