= James I and the English Parliament =

Relationship between the king and Parliament

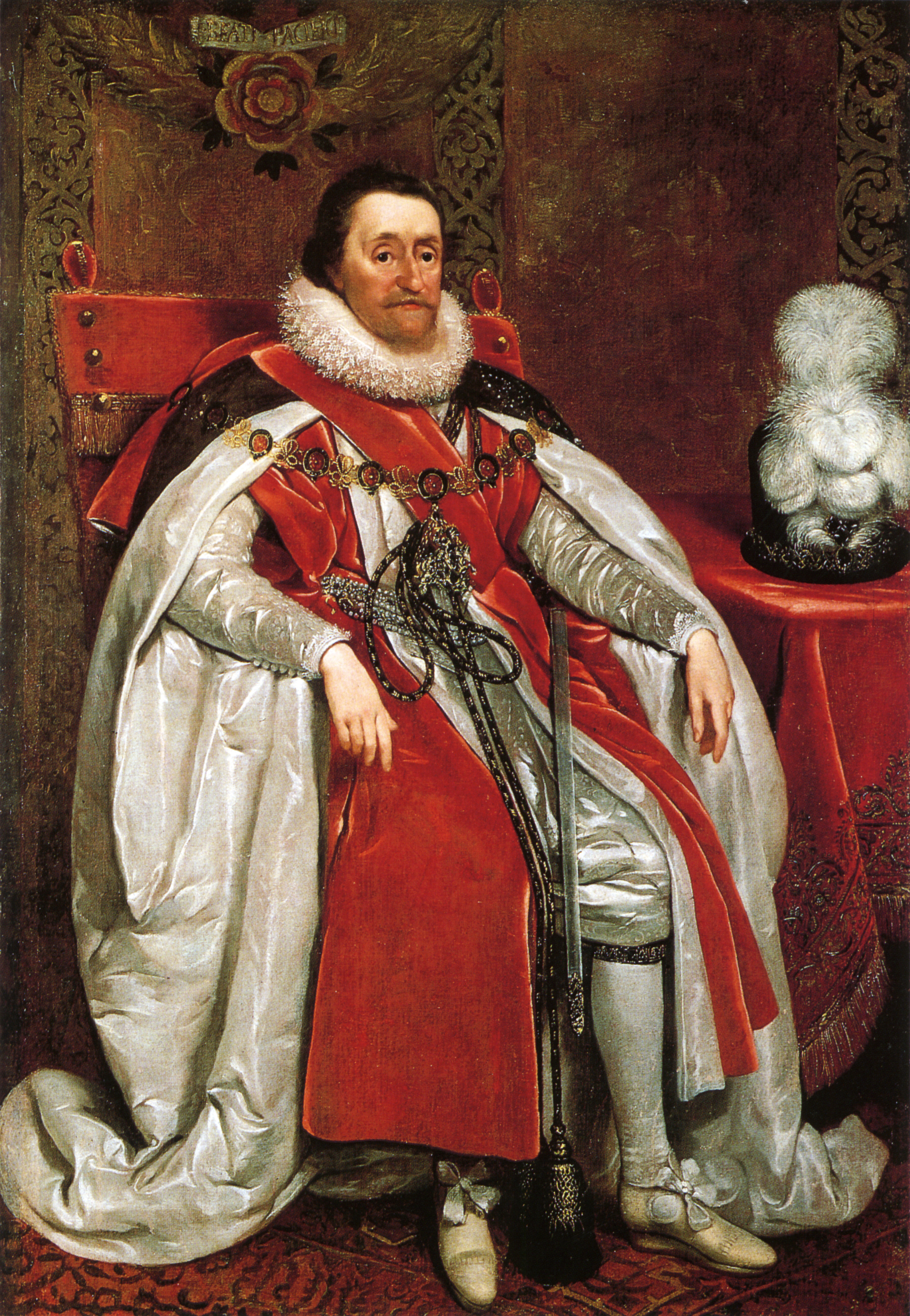
James I wearing the insignia of the Order of the Garter for a portrait by Daniel Mytens in 1621.

James I, the first king to reign in both England and Scotland, faced many difficulties with the Parliament of England. Though recent studies have shown that the Parliament of Scotland may have been more of a thorn in his side than was previously believed, James developed his political philosophy of the relationship between monarch and parliament in Scotland and reconciled himself to the independent stance of the English Parliament and its unwillingness to bow readily to his policies.

== Overview ==
The source of concern was that the King and Parliament adhered to two mutually, extended exclusive views about the nature of their relationship. James I believed that he owed his authority to God-given right, that the law(s) of, and in, "His" Kingdom were only an extension of his royal prerogative, and that Parliament was in essence a lower Court to him, its laws and opinions always subject to his oversight and review; and that he was free to revise or overrule them completely whenever he wished. In the areas Royal administration and governmental policy (i.e., how the government did its business and what directions it took in the affairs of the country), the King saw no role for Parliament or to be informally bound by its opinions at all.

Parliament on the other hand, particularly the Commons, first of all saw the relationship as a partnership. Parliament believed the king ruled by contract (an unwritten one, yet fully binding). Parliament believed that its own rights to exist and to function in the ongoing work of the government of the country were as sacrosanct as those of the King and, in that sense, Parliament's rights were equal to those of the King. Furthermore, Parliament believed that in return for grants of subsidies to the Crown, the king should take its views on policy formulation and execution into account.

The result of this fundamental disagreement was a series of difficult parliaments, two of which James dissolved in frustration. Many historians, from the mid-seventeenth century to the present, have traced the problems with Parliament faced by James's son, Charles I, to those experienced by James, though others have questioned the inevitability of Charles's fatal clashes with Parliament.

=== Theory of monarchy ===
In 1597–1598, James wrote two works, The Trew Law of Free Monarchies and Basilikon Doron (Royal Gift), in which he established an ideological base for monarchy. In the Trew Law, he sets out the divine right of kings, explaining that for Biblical reasons kings are higher beings than other men, though "the highest bench is the sliddriest to sit upon". The document proposes an absolutist theory of monarchy, by which a king may impose new laws by royal prerogative but must also pay heed to tradition and to God, who would "stirre up such scourges as pleaseth him, for punishment of wicked kings". Basilikon Doron, written as a book of instruction for the four-year-old Prince Henry, provides a more practical guide to kingship. Despite banalities and sanctimonious advice, the work is well written, perhaps the best example of James's prose. James's advice concerning parliaments, which he understood as merely the king's "head court", foreshadows his difficulties with the English Commons: "Hold no Parliaments," he tells Henry, "but for the necesitie of new Lawes, which would be but seldome". In the True Law James states that the king owns his realm as a feudal lord owns his fief, because:

"[Kings arose] before any estates or ranks of men, before any parliaments were holden, or laws made, and by them was the land distributed, which at first was wholly theirs. And so it follows of necessity that kings were the authors and makers of the laws, and not the laws of the kings."

James was ambitious to build on the personal union of the crowns of Scotland and England (the Union of the Crowns) to establish a complete and permanent union of the two realms under one monarch, one parliament and one law, a plan which met opposition in both countries. "Hath He not made us all in one island," James told the English parliament, "compassed with one sea and of itself by nature indivisible?" In April 1604, however, the Commons refused on legal grounds his request to be titled "King of Great Britain". A disappointed James retorted: "I am not ashamed of my project, neither have I deferred it (I be to deal plainly) out of a liking of the judges' reasons or uses". In October 1604, he assumed the title "King of Great Britain" by proclamation rather than statute, though Sir Francis Bacon told him he could not use the style in "any legal proceeding, instrument or assurance". The decision was a sign that where he lacked the consent of the Commons for his policies, James intended, unlike his predecessor, to resort to the royal prerogative.

=== King and Parliament ===
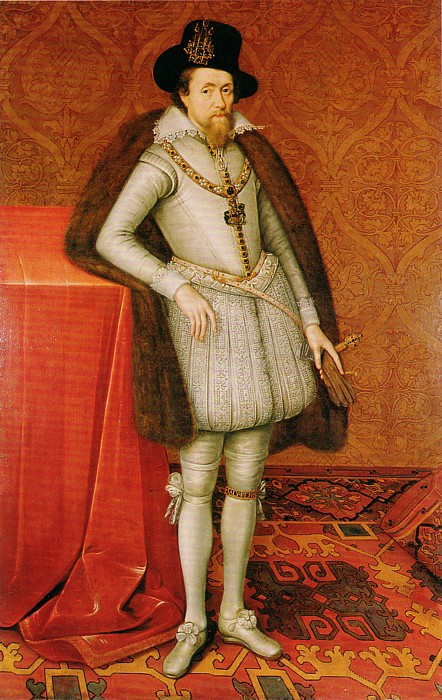
Portrait of James by John de Critz, circa 1606

James's difficulties with his first parliament in 1604 ended the initial euphoria of his succession. On 7 July, he prorogued the parliament, having achieved his aims neither for the full union nor for the obtaining of funds. "I will not thank where I feel no thanks due," he remarked in his closing speech. "...I am not of such a stock as to praise fools...You see how many things you did not well...I wish you would make use of your liberty with more modesty in time to come". The parliament of 1604 may be seen as shaping the attitudes of both sides for the rest of the reign, though the difficulties owed more to mutual incomprehension than conscious enmity. On the eve of the state opening of the next parliamentary session on 5 November 1605, a soldier called Guy Fawkes was discovered in the cellars of the parliament buildings guarding a pile of slaves, not far from about twenty barrels of gunpowder with which he intended to blow up Parliament House the following day and cause the destruction, as James put it, "not only...of my person, nor of my wife and posterity also, but of the whole body of the State in general". A Catholic conspiracy led by a disaffected gentleman called Robert Catesby, the Gunpowder Plot, as it quickly became known, had in fact been discovered in advance of Fawkes's arrest and deliberately allowed to mature in order to catch the culprits red-handed and the plotters unawares.

James's difficulties with the Commons and his waning public popularity notwithstanding, the sensational discovery of the Gunpowder Plot aroused a potent wave of national relief at the delivery of the king and his sons and inspired in the ensuing parliament a mood of loyalty and goodwill which Salisbury astutely exploited to extract higher subsidies for the king than any but one granted in Elizabeth's reign. In his speech to both houses on 9 November, James expounded on two emerging preoccupations of his monarchy: the divine right of kings and the Catholic question. He insisted that the plot had been the work of a few Catholics and not of the English Catholics as a whole. And he reminded the assembly to rejoice at his survival, since kings were gods and he owed his escape to a miracle.

The "Goodwin Case" drew a dispute in the early portion of James's reign. Sir Francis Goodwin, a known outlaw, was elected to parliament as MP for the constituency of Buckinghamshire. The election of outlaws had been prohibited by royal proclamation and James demanded that the commons exclude Goodwin from its membership. However, the commons claimed it should be the judge of its own election results and James, after some dispute, pragmatically backed down. This event did, however, create animosity between crown and parliament.

=== "The Great Contract" ===
As James's reign progressed, his government faced growing financial pressures. Some of those resulted from creeping inflation and the decreasing purchasing power of the royal income, but James's profligacy and financial incompetence substantially contributed to the mounting debt. Salisbury took over the reins as Lord Treasurer himself in 1608 and, with the backing of the Privy Council, introduced a programme of economic reforms which steadily drove down the deficit. In an attempt to convince James to curb his extravagance, he wrote a series of frank tracts on the matter, and he tried to induce the king to grant limited pensions to his courtiers, rather than showering them with random gifts. A believer in the necessity of parliamentary contribution to government, Salisbury proposed to the Commons, in February 1610, an ambitious financial scheme, known as The Great Contract, whereby Parliament would grant a lump sum of £600,000 to pay off the king's debts in return for ten royal concessions, plus an annual grant of £200,000. Though the Commons agreed to the annual grant, the negotiations over the lump sum became so protracted and difficult that James eventually lost patience and dismissed the parliament on 31 December 1610. "Your greatest error," he told Salisbury, "hath been that ye ever expected to draw honey out of gall". Salisbury, however, made it clear that without parliamentary subsidies, he could do no more to manage the Crown's financial crisis. The subsequent downfall of the Howards left George Villiers, now earl of Buckingham, unchallenged as the supreme figure in the government by 1618. James had been attempting to rule without Parliament since the "Addled Parliament" of 1614, which he had dissolved after eight weeks when it proved reluctant to grant him money. Buckingham addressed the search for alternative revenues, employing officials, such as the businessman Lionel Cranfield, who were astute in raising and saving money for the Crown. Cash was also raised by selling earldoms and other dignities, many created by James himself.

=== The Spanish match ===
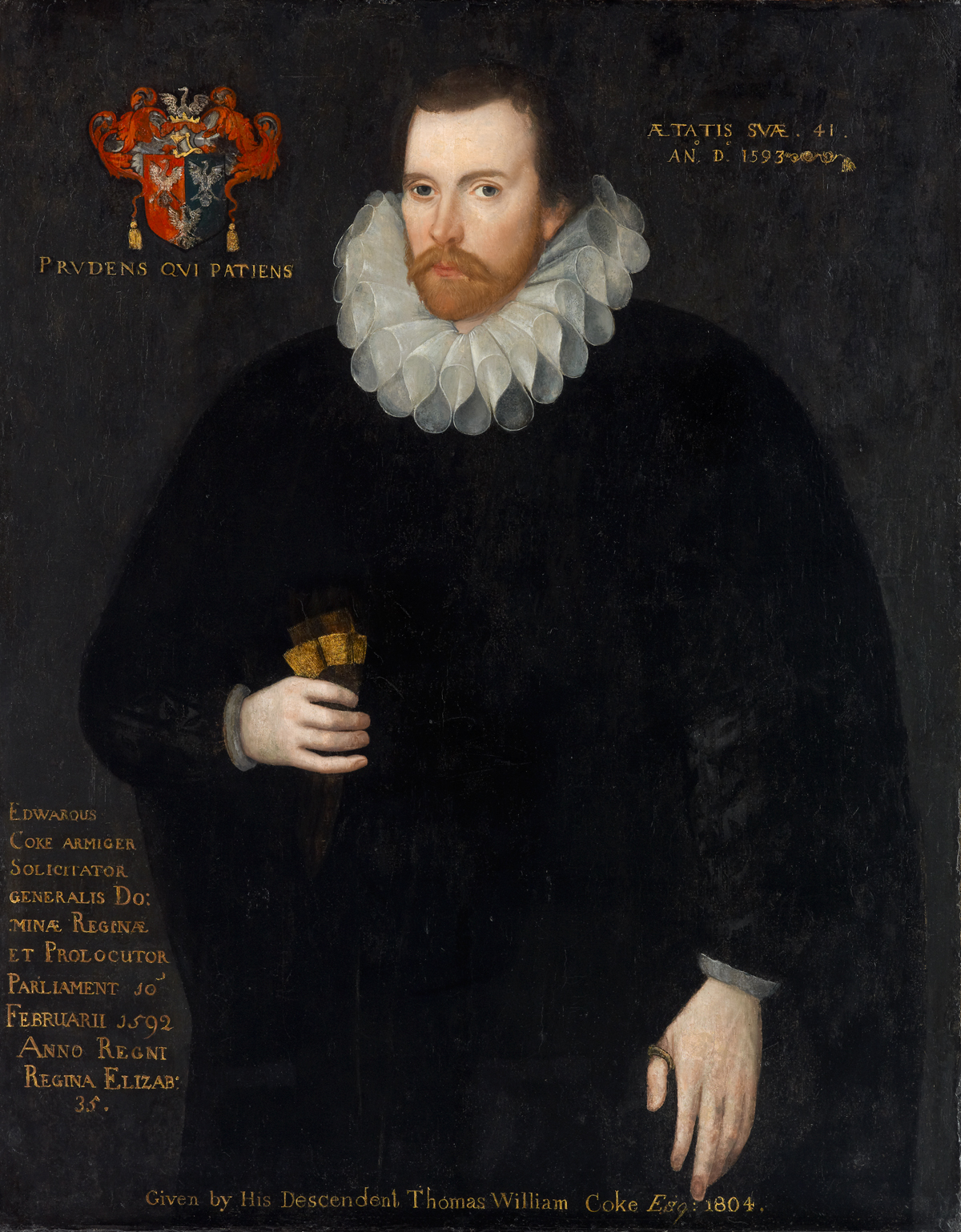
Sir Edward Coke

Another potential source of income was the prospect of a Spanish dowry from a marriage between Charles, Prince of Wales and the Spanish Infanta, Maria. The policy of the Spanish Match, as it was called, was supported by the Howards and other Catholic-leaning ministers and diplomats—together known as the Spanish Party—but deeply distrusted in Protestant England, a sentiment voiced vociferously in the Commons when James finally called a parliament in 1621 to raise funds for a military expedition in support of Frederick V, Elector Palatine.

By the 1620s, events on the continent had stirred up anti-Catholic feeling to a new pitch. A conflict had broken out between the Catholic Holy Roman Empire and the Protestant Bohemians, who had deposed the emperor as their king and elected James's son-in-law, Frederick V, Elector Palatine, in his place, triggering the Thirty Years' War. James reluctantly summoned parliament as the only means to raise the funds necessary to assist his daughter Elizabeth and Frederick, who had been ousted from Prague by Emperor Ferdinand II in 1620. The Commons on the one hand granted subsidies inadequate to finance serious military operations in aid of Frederick, and on the other called for a war directly against Spain. In November 1621, led by Sir Edward Coke, they framed a petition asking not only for a war with Spain but for Prince Charles to marry a Protestant, and for enforcement of the anti-Catholic laws. James flatly told them not to interfere in matters of royal prerogative or they would risk punishment; to which provocation they reacted by issuing a statement protesting their rights, including freedom of speech. Urged on by Buckingham and the Spanish ambassador Gondomar, James ripped the protest out of the record book and dissolved Parliament.

Denied the military option, James ignored public opinion and returned to the Spanish match as his only hope of restoring the possessions of Elizabeth and Frederick. When negotiations began to drag, Prince Charles, now 23, and Buckingham, decided to seize the initiative and travel to Spain incognito, to win the Infanta directly. Arriving in Madrid on 17 February 1623 to the astonishment of King Philip IV, the impetuous delegation proved a desperate mistake. Charles and Buckingham had no idea that Maria was strongly averse to marrying a non-Catholic and that the Spanish, who had been protracting the marriage negotiations to keep British troops out of the war, would never agree to such a match unless Charles converted to Catholicism and pledged to repeal the anti-Catholic laws. Though a secret treaty was signed, the prince and duke returned to England in October without the Infanta, much to the delight of the British people.

Embittered by their treatment in Spain, Charles and Buckingham now turned James's Spanish policy upon its head and called for a French match and a war against the Habsburg empire. To raise the necessary finance, they prevailed upon James to call another Parliament, which met in February 1624. For once, the outpouring of anti-Catholic sentiment in the Commons was echoed in court, where control of policy had shifted from James to Charles and Buckingham, who pressured the king to declare war and engineered the impeachment and imprisonment of the Lord Treasurer, Lionel Cranfield, earl of Middlesex, when he opposed the idea on grounds of cost.

The outcome of the Parliament of 1624 was ambiguous: James still refused to declare war, but Charles believed the Commons had committed themselves to financing a war against Spain, a stance which was to contribute to his problems with Parliament in his own reign.
