= Thomas Bonham (physician) =

British surgeon

Thomas Bonham M.D. (c. 1564 – c. 1628) was an English physician, now remembered for his involvement in Dr. Bonham's Case, of legal rather than medical significance.

== Life ==
Bonham was educated at St John's College, Cambridge, where he graduated B.A. in 1581, and M.A. in 1585. He was incorporated B.A. at Oxford in 1584, and on 9 July 1611 was M.D. there. He practised his profession in London, and was an assistant to the Society of Medicine-Chirurgians. His death occurred about 1629.

== Bonham's Case ==
Bonham was a physician by qualification, with a Cambridge medical degree (date now unclear), styling himself a medical doctor by 1602. He was not thereby qualified to practise in London by administering internal remedies, without a license from the College of Physicians of London. Bonham took the side of the surgeons, then a separate profession, who in 1605 petitioned parliament, unsuccessfully, for full rights as doctors. Then putting himself forward for examination by the College of Physicians in 1605, and 1606, he had a confrontation with Henry Atkins of the college on the second occasion. Finding himself in Newgate Prison for contempt of the college, he was freed by his lawyer under habeas corpus.

Still faced with a large fine from the college for unlicensed practice, Bonham pursued the matter by legal means, which set the Court of Common Pleas against the Court of King's Bench. Sir Edward Coke in the Common Pleas ruled for Bonham, who was again in prison, and fined the college, at the same time commenting on the college's status (a charter confirmed by parliament) as potentially subject to the common law. Coke's decision outraged the king and some leading lawyers, and continued to resonate for two centuries.

== Works ==
Bonham left books and papers to his servant, Edward Poeton, by whom they were edited and published as The Chyrurgians Closet, or Antidotarie Chyrurgicall, London 1630. The work was dedicated by Poeton, then residing at Petworth in Sussex, to Frances, Dowager Countess of Exeter, second wife of Thomas Cecil, 1st Earl of Exeter.

== Notes ==
Attribution

This article incorporates text from a publication now in the public domain: Stephen, Leslie, ed. (1886). "Bonham, Thomas". Dictionary of National Biography. Vol. 5. London: Smith, Elder & Co.
