= Robert Cecil, 1st Earl of Salisbury =

English government minister (1563–1612)

The Right Honourable The Earl of Salisbury KG PC
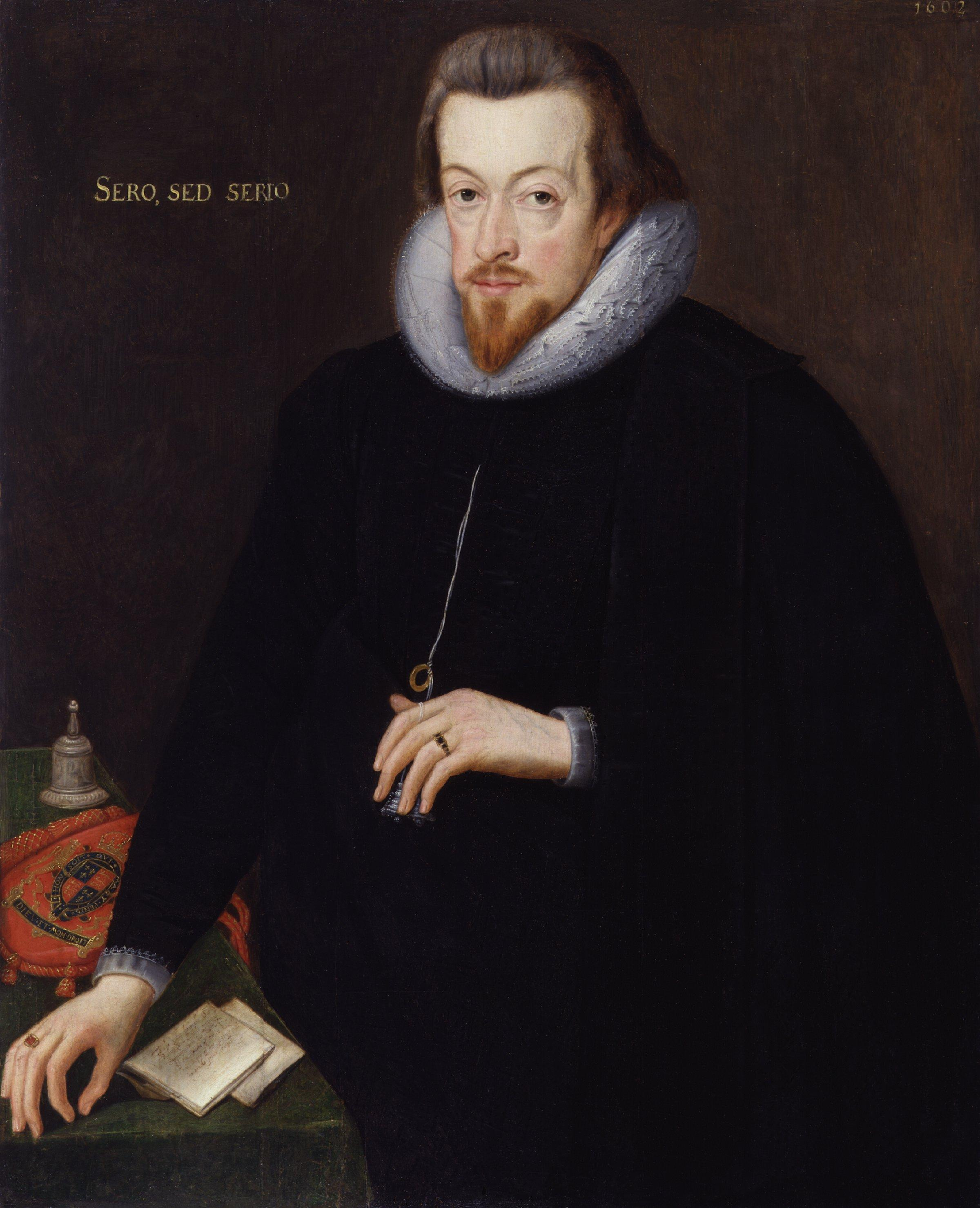
- Portrait by John de Critz the Elder, c. 1602

Lord High Treasurer
- In office 4 May 1608 – 24 May 1612
- Monarch: James I
- Preceded by: The Earl of Dorset
- Succeeded by: The Earl of Northampton (as First Lord)

Lord Privy Seal
- In office 1598–1608
- Monarchs: Elizabeth I James I
- Preceded by: The Lord Burghley
- Succeeded by: The Earl of Northampton

Chancellor of the Duchy of Lancaster
- In office 8 October 1597 – 1599
- Monarch: Elizabeth I
- Preceded by: In commission
- Succeeded by: In commission

Secretary of State
- In office 5 July 1596 – 24 May 1612
- Monarchs: Elizabeth I James I
- Preceded by: William Davison
- Succeeded by: John Herbert

Personal details
- Born: 1 June 1563 Westminster, London, England
- Died: 24 May 1612 (aged 48) Marlborough, Wiltshire, England
- Spouse: Elizabeth Brooke
- Children: 2, including William
- Parent(s): William Cecil, 1st Baron Burghley; Mildred Cooke
- Education: St John's College, Cambridge

Robert Cecil, 1st Earl of Salisbury (1 June 1563 – 24 May 1612) was an English statesman and alleged spymaster noted for his direction of the government during the Union of the Crowns, as Tudor England gave way to Stuart rule (1603). Lord Salisbury served as the Secretary of State of England (1596–1612) and Lord High Treasurer (1608–1612), succeeding his father as Queen Elizabeth I's Lord Privy Seal and remaining in power during the first nine years of King James I's reign until his own death.

The principal discoverer of the Gunpowder Plot of 1605, Robert Cecil remains a controversial historic figure as it is still debated at what point he first learned of the plot and to what extent he acted as an agent provocateur.

== Early life and family ==
Cecil (created Earl of Salisbury in 1605) was the younger son of William Cecil, 1st Baron Burghley by his second wife, Mildred Cooke, eldest daughter of Sir Anthony Cooke of Gidea, Essex. His elder half-brother was Thomas Cecil, 1st Earl of Exeter, and philosopher Francis Bacon, 1st Viscount St Albans, was his first cousin.

Robert Cecil was 5 ft 4 in (163 cm) tall and had scoliosis which resulted in a curved back. Living in an age which attached much importance to physical beauty in both sexes, he endured much ridicule as a result: Queen Elizabeth I called him "my pygmy", and King James I nicknamed him "my little beagle". Nonetheless, his father recognised that it was Robert rather than his half-brother Thomas who had inherited his own political genius.

Cecil attended St John's College, Cambridge, in the 1580s, but did not take a degree. He also attended "disputations" at the Sorbonne.

In 1589, Cecil married Elizabeth Brooke, the daughter of William Brooke, 10th Baron Cobham by his second wife, Frances Newton. Their son, William Cecil, was born in Westminster on 28 March 1591, and baptised in St Clement Danes on 11 April. He was followed by a daughter, Lady Frances Cecil (1593–1644). Elizabeth died in 1597, leaving Cecil with two small children. Her brothers Henry, 11th Baron Cobham, and George Brooke were arrested by Cecil for their involvement in the Bye and Main Plots; George, her younger brother, was executed at Winchester on 5 December 1603 for high treason.

In 1608, Frances Cecil caught the eye of King James I's daughter Elizabeth and she made Sir John Harington write to Salisbury to invite her to join her household. She married the 5th Earl of Cumberland and had one daughter but no sons.

== Secretary of State ==
=== Under Elizabeth ===
In 1584, Cecil sat for the first time in the House of Commons, representing his birthplace, the borough of Westminster, and was re-elected in 1586. He was a back bencher, never making a speech until 1593, some time after having been appointed a Privy Counsellor. In 1588, he accompanied Lord Derby in his mission to the Netherlands to negotiate peace with Spain. He was elected for Hertfordshire in 1589, 1593, 1597, and 1601. The 1591 appointment as a Privy Counsellor came to fruition when by 1597 he became the Council's leader.

Following the death of Sir Francis Walsingham in 1590, Burghley acted as Secretary of State, while Cecil took on an increasingly heavy work-load. He was also knighted and subsequently appointed to the Privy Council in 1591, and began to act as Secretary of State in 1589, although his formal appointment came later. He participated in the social life of the royal court: on 15 September 1595 he went hawking with the queen and they caught three partridges, which they gave to Elizabeth Wolley.

In 1597, he was made Chancellor of the Duchy of Lancaster, and in February 1598 dispatched on a mission to Henry IV of France, to prevent the impending alliance between that country and Spain. Three ambassadors, Cecil, John Herbert, and Thomas Wilkes left from Dover, but Wilkes died soon after arrival at Rouen. Cecil and Herbert lodged at a house of the Duke of Montpensier in Paris, and subsequently travelled south to meet the French king at Angers in March. They had their final audiences with the king at Nantes and the Duke de Bouillon gave Cecil a locket with the king's portrait. They sailed home to Portsmouth from Ouistreham, a port near Caen, in the Adventure commanded by Sir Alexander Clifford. Cecil became the leading minister after the death of his father in August 1598, serving both Queen Elizabeth and King James as Secretary of State.

Cecil fell into dispute with the 2nd Earl of Essex, and only prevailed at Court upon the latter's poor campaign against the Irish rebels during the Nine Years War in 1599. He was then in a position to orchestrate the smooth succession of King James. Lord Essex's unsuccessful rebellion in 1601, which resulted in his final downfall and death, was largely aimed at Sir Robert Cecil, as he then was, who was to be removed from power and impeached. Whether Essex intended that Cecil should actually die is unclear.

It is to Cecil's credit that the Queen, largely at his urging, treated the rebels with a degree of mercy, which was unusual in that age. Essex himself and four of his closest allies were executed, but the great majority of his followers were spared: even Essex's denunciation of his sister Penelope, as the ringleader of the rebellion, was tactfully ignored. This clemency did Cecil, on the other hand, no good in the eyes of the public, who had loved Essex and mourned him deeply. Cecil, who had never been very popular, now became a much-hated figure and was viciously attacked in ballads like Essex's Last Good Night.

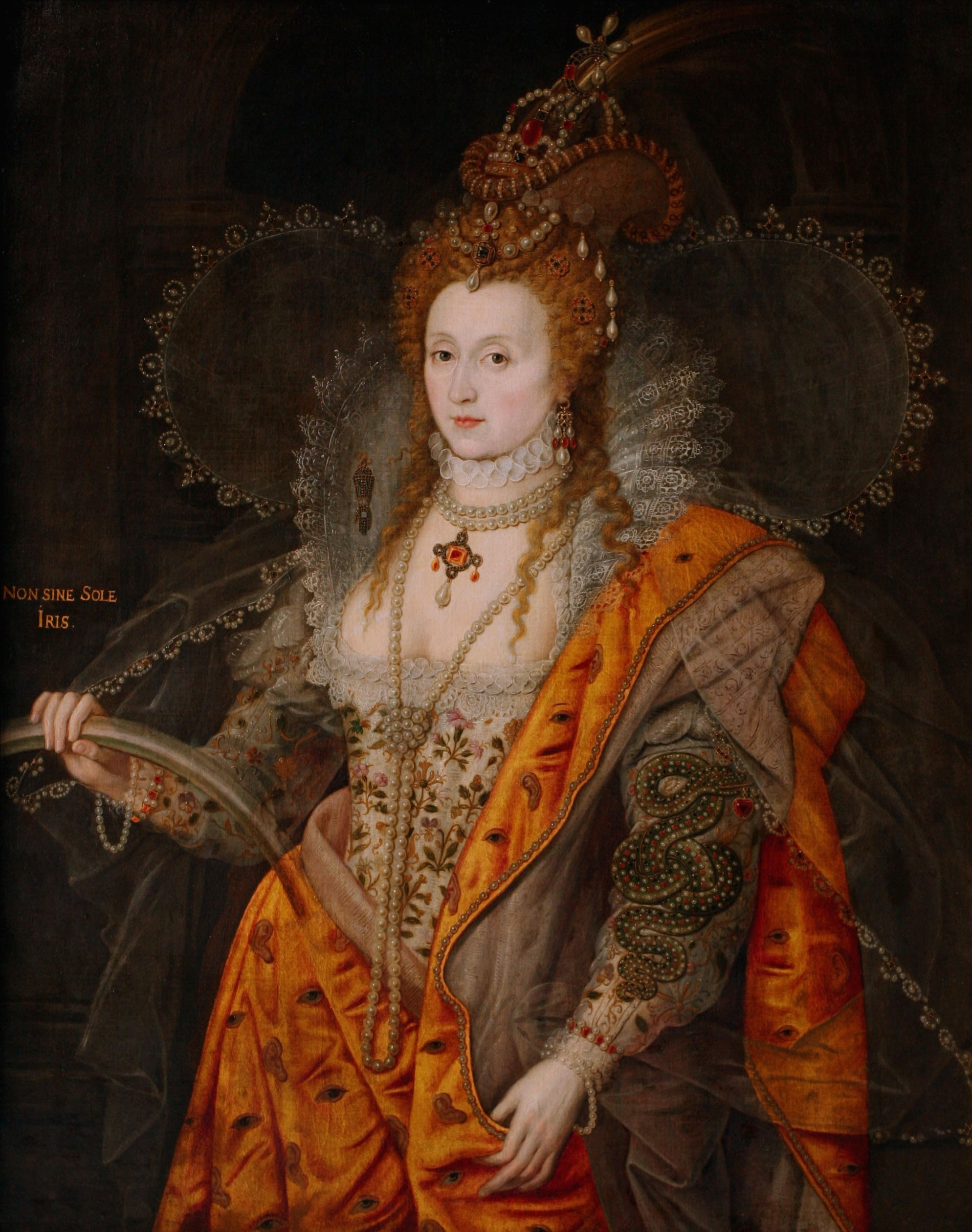
The Rainbow Portrait of Elizabeth I at Hatfield House has been seen as reflecting Cecil's role as spymaster after the death of Sir Francis Walsingham, due to the eyes and ears in the pattern of the dress.

Cecil was extensively involved in matters of state security. As the son of Queen Elizabeth's principal minister and a protégé of Francis Walsingham (Elizabeth's principal spymaster), he was trained by them in spy-craft as a matter of course. The "Rainbow Portrait" of Queen Elizabeth at Hatfield, decorated with eyes and ears, may relate to this role.

Cecil, like his father, greatly admired the Queen, whom he famously described as being "more than a man, but less than a woman". Despite his careful preparations for the succession, he clearly regarded the Queen's death as a misfortune to be postponed as long as possible. During her last illness, when Elizabeth would sit motionless on cushions for hours on end, Cecil boldly told her that she must go to bed. Elizabeth roused herself one last time to snap at him:

"Little man, little man, 'Must' is not a word to use to princes. Your father were he here durst never speak to me so"; but she added wryly "Ah, but ye know that I must die, and it makes you presumptuous".

=== Under James I ===
Sir Robert Cecil now promoted James as successor to Elizabeth. Around 1600, he began a secret correspondence with James in Scotland, to persuade James that he favoured his claims to the English throne. An understanding was now effected by which Cecil was able to assure James of his succession, ensure his own power and predominance in the new reign against Sir Walter Raleigh and other competitors, and secure the tranquillity of the last years of Elizabeth. Cecil demanded as conditions that James stop his attempts to obtain parliamentary recognition of his title, that absolute respect should be paid to the queen's feelings, and that the communications should remain a secret.

James took the throne without opposition, and the new monarch expressed his gratitude by elevating Cecil to the peerage. Cecil also served as both the third chancellor of the University of Dublin, and chancellor of the University of Cambridge, between 1601 and 1612.

In 1603, Cecil's brothers-in-law, Henry Brooke, Lord Cobham and George Brooke, along with Sir Walter Raleigh, were implicated in both the Bye Plot and the Main Plot, an attempt to remove King James I from the throne and replace him with his first cousin, Lady Arbella Stuart. Cecil was one of the judges who tried them for treason: at Raleigh's trial, Cecil was the only judge who appeared to have some doubts about his guilt (which is still a matter of debate, although the prevailing view now is that Raleigh was involved in the Plot to some extent). Though they were found guilty and sentenced to death, both Cobham and Raleigh were eventually reprieved; this may have been due in part to Cecil's pleas for mercy, although the King kept his intentions a secret until the last minute.

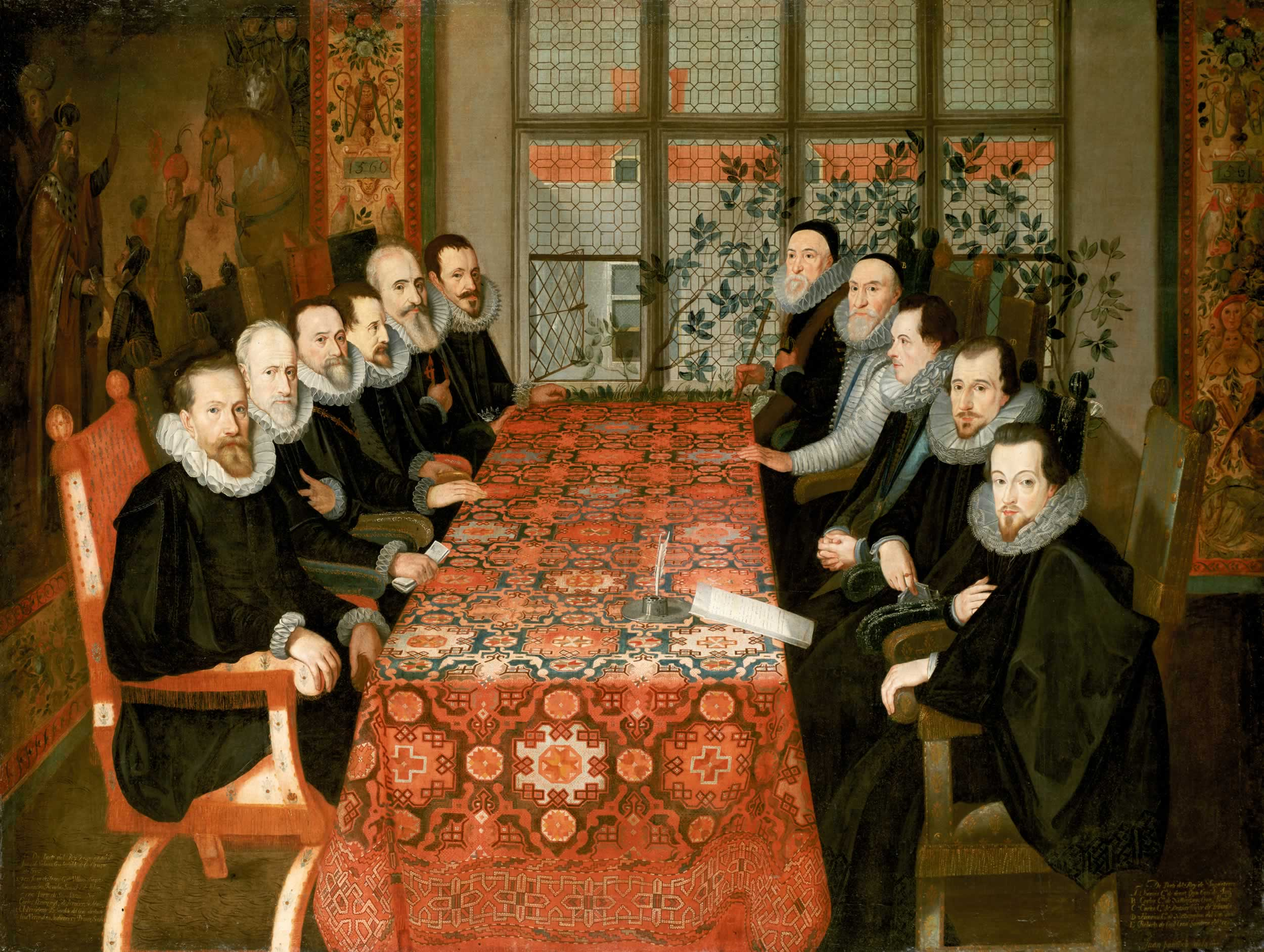
The Treaty of London taking place at Somerset House on 19 August 1604 - Cecil is seen sitting on the right in foreground

King James I raised Robert Cecil to the peerage, on 20 August 1603, as Baron Cecil of Essendon in the County of Rutland. Baron Cecil then led the English delegation at the Treaty of London that brought peace between Spain and England after a long war. Between 1603 and 1604 difficult negotiations with the Spanish delegation took place, but through Cecil's determined statesmanship the treaty bought an "honourable and advantageous" peace for England. This was a personal triumph for Cecil which reflected well on James, who wanted to be styled as a European peacemaker between the Protestants and the Catholics. Cecil accepted a pension of £1,000 that year, which was raised the following year to £1,500. The King also rewarded Cecil further creating him Viscount Cranborne soon after the treaty had been signed and then Earl of Salisbury the following year. Cecil was appointed to the Order of the Garter as its 401st Knight in 1606. In 1607, James appointed him as Lord Treasurer, succeeding Thomas Sackville, 1st Earl of Dorset. As a result, the whole conduct of public affairs was solely in his hands, although the king often interfered.

Although King James would often speak disparagingly of Cecil as "my little beagle" or "young Tom Durie", he gave him his absolute trust. "Though you are but a little man, I shall shortly load your shoulders with business", the King joked to him at their first meeting. Cecil, who had endured a lifetime of jibes about his height (even Queen Elizabeth had called him "pygmy" and "little man"; he had a curvature of the spine and was barely 5 feet (1.5 m) tall), is unlikely to have found the joke funny, while the crushing weight of business with which the King duly loaded him probably hastened his death at the age of 48. The Venetian ambassador, Nicolò Molin, described Cecil as short and "crook-backed", with a noble countenance and features.

Cecil was the principal discoverer of the Gunpowder Plot of 1605: at what point he first learned of it, and to what extent he acted as an agent provocateur, has been a subject of controversy ever since. On balance, it seems most likely that he had heard rumors of a plot, but had no firm evidence until the Catholic peer, William Parker, 4th Baron Monteagle, showed him the celebrated anonymous letter, warning Monteagle to stay away from the opening of Parliament. The Gunpowder Plot itself was a belated reaction to what was seen as the King's betrayal of a pledge to repeal, or at least mitigate, the Penal Laws. Cecil was undoubtedly among those who advised King James I not to tamper with the existing laws. However, his attitude to Catholics was not, for the time, especially harsh: he admitted that he was unhappy with the notorious Jesuits, etc. Act 1584, by which any Catholic priest who was found guilty of acting as a priest in England was liable to the death penalty in its most gruesome form. Like most moderate Englishmen at the time, he thought that exile, rather than death, was the appropriate penalty for the priests. Cecil did hope, like his father, to make England the head of the international Protestant alliance, and his last energies were expended in effecting the marriage in 1612 of the princess Elizabeth, James's daughter, with Frederick, the Elector Palatine. Still, he was averse to prosecution for religion, and attempted to distinguish between the large body of law-abiding and loyal Catholics and those connected with plots against the throne and government.

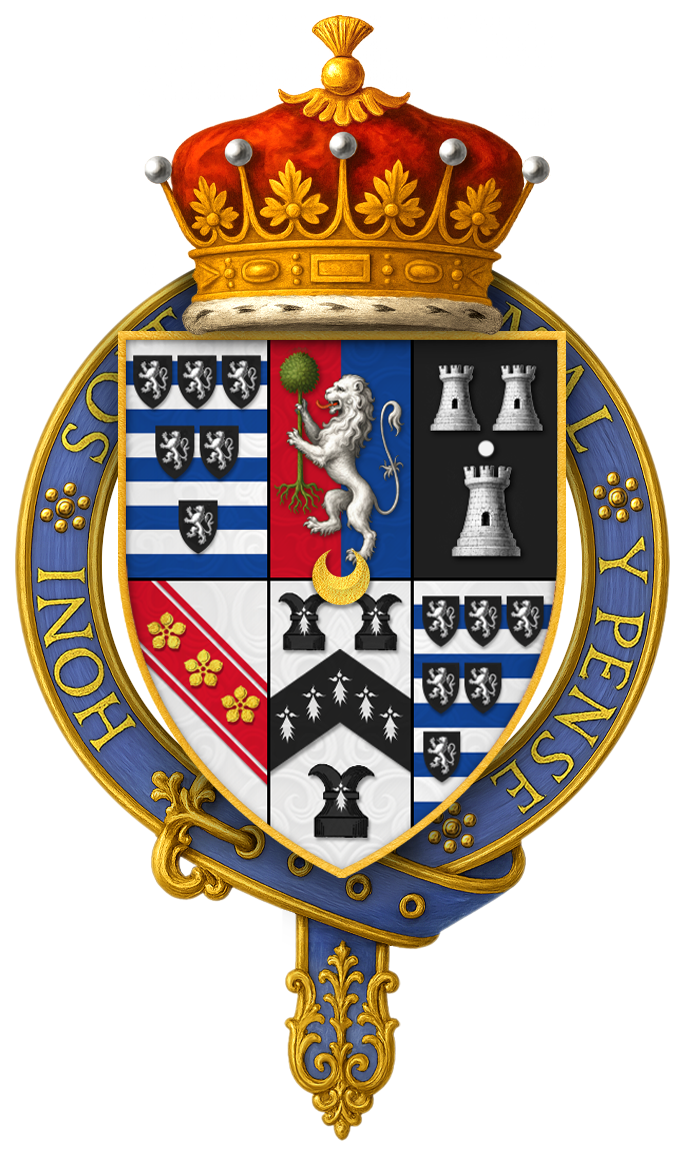
Garter-encircled arms Sir Robert Cecil, 1st Earl of Salisbury, KG

The Kingdom of Ireland was a major source of concern and expense during Robert Cecil's time in government. The Nine Years' War there had ended with the leader of the rebels, Hugh O'Neill, Earl of Tyrone, submitting to the Crown and being restored to his estates, following the Treaty of Mellifont (1603). Four years later, Tyrone led his followers into exile during the Flight of the Earls. The response of the government was to plan a Plantation of Ulster, to share out Tyrone's lands between the Gaelic Irish lords and the settlers from Britain. In 1608, Sir Cahir O'Doherty launched O'Doherty's rebellion by attacking and burning Derry. In the wake of O'Doherty's defeat at Kilmacrennan, a much larger plantation was undertaken.

Cecil wrote humorous letters to his friend Adam Newton, the tutor of Prince Henry. Apologizing for a minor breach of manners, he compared himself to the court jester Tom Durie. In another letter he wrote that if a certain man failed to gain a place in Prince Henry's household, he should be sent to "Tom Dyrry or to me". Although the applicant was poor he could become rich by charging a fee to all the girls in England who wished to meet the Prince.

In 1611 Cecil disapproved of the proposed marriage between the Prince of Wales and the Infanta of Spain. He may have also received a pension from France.

== Lord Treasurer ==
As Lord Treasurer, Lord Salisbury, as he became in 1605, showed considerable financial ability. During the year preceding his acceptance of that office in 1608, the expenditure had risen to £500,000, leaving a yearly deficit of £73,000. Lord Salisbury took advantage of the decision by the judges in the Court of Exchequer in Bates's Case in favour of the King's right to levy impositions (import duties), and imposed new duties on articles of luxury and those of foreign manufacture which competed with English goods. By this measure, and by a more careful collection, the ordinary income was raised to £460,000, while £700,000 was paid off the debt.

In 1610–11, Salisbury worked hard to persuade Parliament to enact the Great Contract, under which the King would give up all his feudal and customary sources of revenue (wardship and purveyance) in return for a fixed annual income of approximately £300,000. The rationale was that the King was spending extravagantly, exceeding his income by £140,000, and putting the kingdom into debt. By 1608, the debt was £1.4 million, although the Lord Treasurer managed to get that down to £300,000 by 1610. The project was one to which Salisbury attached great importance, but the House of Commons eventually lost interest in the plan, and Francis Bacon argued against it, calling it humiliating. King James I also did not show much enthusiasm for it, and it lapsed when the King, against Salisbury's advice, dissolved Parliament in 1611. This was a double blow to Lord Salisbury, who was sick and prematurely aged, and conscious that the King now increasingly preferred the company of his male favourites, like the 1st Earl of Somerset. Although it failed to be implemented, the concept of paying an annual income to the monarch was revived some five decades later as a solution to the nation's financial problems and formed the basis for the financial settlement at the Restoration of Charles II, through which Charles was to receive an income of approximately £1,200,000 per annum. One historian describes this annual payment as the eventual "implementation of Cecil's Great Contract".

== Houses and the arts ==
In May 1591 Cecil was involved in an entertainment for the arrival of Queen Elizabeth at Theobalds, the Hertfordshire family home. The Hermit's Welcome at Theobalds made allusion to his father's potential retirement from public life. In July 1593 a Scottish suitor for Cecil's favour, William Dundas of Fingask wrote to him from Edinburgh. Dundas had heard Cecil was completing a gallery in one of his houses and would like paintings with "such toys" or emblems as he had seen himself in Scotland.

In 1606, Lord Salisbury, as Cecil was now, entertained King James I and his brother-in-law, King Christian IV of Denmark, at Theobalds, under the sardonic eye of Queen Elizabeth's godson, Sir John Harrington. Both monarchs were notoriously heavy drinkers, and according to some of those present, the occasion was simply an orgy of drunkenness, as few English or Danish courtiers had their rulers' capacity to hold their drink. According to Harrington, who may have been mischievously fictionalising, the masque put on to honour the two kings was a drunken fiasco: "the entertainment and show went forward, and most of the players went backward, or fell down, wine did so occupy their upper chambers".

In 1607, King James took possession of Theobalds, giving Hatfield Palace to Lord Salisbury in exchange, a relatively old-fashioned property that the King disliked. Salisbury had a disposition for building and tore down parts of it and used its bricks to build Hatfield House. Work continued on the house until 1612. He remodelled Cranborne Manor, originally a small hunting lodge, and built Salisbury House (also referred to as Cecil House), his London residence on the Strand.

The Cecil family fostered arts: they supported musicians such as William Byrd, Orlando Gibbons, Thomas Robinson, and the Irish harper and composer Cormac MacDermott. Byrd composed his famous pavane The Earle of Salisbury in his memory. Salisbury's motto was "Sero, sed serio", which can be translated as 'late but in earnest'.

== Death ==
In poor health and worn out by years of overwork, Salisbury, in the spring of 1612, went on a journey to take the waters at Bath in hope of a cure; but he obtained little relief. He started on the journey home but died of cancer, "in great pain and even greater wretchedness of mind", at Marlborough, Wiltshire, on 24 May 1612, a week short of his 49th birthday. He was buried in St Etheldreda's Church, Hatfield, in a tomb designed by Maximilian Colt.

== Portrayals ==
- He appears as the character "Lord Cecil" in the opera Roberto Devereux (1837) by Gaetano Donizetti; he also appears in the opera Gloriana (1953) by Benjamin Britten.
- In the BBC TV drama serial Elizabeth R (1971), "Sir Robert Cecil" is played by Hugh Dickson.
- IN the BBC2 ScreenPlay episode "Traitors", he is played by Anton Lesser.
- In the HBO miniseries Elizabeth I, Cecil is played by Toby Jones.
- In the BBC TV drama series Gunpowder (2017), he is played by Mark Gatiss.
- In the alternate history novel Ruled Britannia, predicated on the victory of the Spanish Armada in 1588, he and his father organise the English resistance movement against the Spanish with the help of William Shakespeare.
- Robert Cecil was portrayed as the unsympathetic, conniving antagonist of the play, Equivocation, written by Bill Cain, which first premiered at the Oregon Shakespeare Festival in 2009. In the play, it is suggested that Cecil was behind the conspiracies of the Gunpowder Plot to kill King James and the royal family. Cecil was first portrayed by Jonathan Haugen. The character in the show was given a serious limp, and is said to hate the word "tomorrow" and to know every detail about everything that goes on in London.
- He is portrayed extremely unsympathetically in The Desperate Remedy: Henry Gresham and the Gunpowder Plot by Martin Stephen (ISBN 0-316-85970-2), as malevolently self-centred, exploiting the plot to try to bolster his own position in face of his unpopularity.
- He is a minor character in the children's novel Cue for Treason by Geoffrey Trease, where he is portrayed positively.
- Robert Cecil is portrayed sympathetically in the historical mystery series featuring Joan and Matthew Stock, written by Leonard Tourney, where he is a patron to the main characters. The first novel is The Players' Boy is Dead.
- Sir Robert Cecil features prominently in Irish playwright Thomas Kilroy's play The O'Neill (1969), in which Kilroy uses Cecil to challenge the myth surrounding Gaelic Hugh O'Neill, Earl of Tyrone, just after the latter's victory over the English at The Yellow Ford. Cecil's dramatic function is to demonstrate the complexity of history as opposed to simplistic pieties that would turn O'Neill into yet another victim of the English. Cecil 'obliges' O'Neill to reenact the past so the audience witnesses the moral dilemma of a man torn between two cultures and keenly aware of the advance of modernity in a troubled political, cultural and religious context.
- He is portrayed by Tim McInnerny in the 2004 TV mini series Gunpowder, Treason & Plot.
- He is portrayed unsympathetically, yet quite humanly by Edward Hogg as a malevolent villain with a curved back in Roland Emmerich's movie Anonymous (2011).
- He was a major character at the 2012 Pennsylvania Renaissance Faire, portrayed by actor Nate Betancourt.
- He was a major character at the 2012 New York Renaissance Faire, portrayed by actor J. Robert Coppola
- He is portrayed sympathetically in the novel 1610 by Mary Gentle.
- He is mentioned in Red Winter of the Tapestry series, as a figure possessed by Astaroth.
- He was played by Christopher Peck in the premiere of the musical Remember Remember by Lewes Operatic Society in Autumn 2008.
- In the BBC TV miniseries Elizabeth I's Secret Agents (2017, broadcast on PBS in 2018 as Queen Elizabeth's Secret Agents), he is played by British actor Kevin James.
- He was a major character at the 1995 in the Czech TV miniseries From pranks about queens (Z hříček o královnách) in episode Queen pack of Dogs (Královnina smečka psů), portrayed by actor Ondřej Vetchý.
- He is portrayed as a main character of the book Earthly Joys by Philippa Gregory as John Tradescent's master and lord.
- He is portrayed as the antagonist in the comedy play "The Gunpowder Plot", written by Stephen Hyde for British touring theatre company The Three Inch Fools in 2022.

== Bibliography ==
- Alford, Stephen. All His Spies: The Secret World of Robert Cecil, Allen Lane, 2024
- Croft, Pauline. Patronage, Culture and Power: The Early Cecils (2002)
- Croft, Pauline. "The Religion of Robert Cecil." Historical Journal (1991) 34:4 pp: 773.
- Croft, Pauline. "The Reputation of Robert Cecil: Libels, Political Opinion and Popular Awareness in the Early Seventeenth Century." Transactions of the Royal Historical Society (1991) 1: 43+
- Haynes, Alan. Robert Cecil, 1st Earl of Salisbury (1989)
- Loades, David, ed. Reader's Guide to British History (2003) 1: 237–39, historiography
- HMC Calendar of Manuscripts of the Marquis of Salisbury: The Cecil Manuscripts, 1306–1595

Political offices
Preceded by The Lord Burghley as acting secretary	Secretary of State; 1596–1612; With: John Herbert 1600–1612	Succeeded by John Herbert; Viscount Rochester
In commission Title last held by Sir Thomas Heneage	Chancellor of the Duchy of Lancaster; 1597–1599	In commission Title next held by Sir John Fortescue
Preceded by The Lord Burghley	Lord Privy Seal; 1598–1608	Succeeded by The Earl of Northampton
Preceded by The Earl of Dorset	Lord High Treasurer; 1608–1612	In commission First Lord: The Earl of Northampton
Academic offices
Preceded by The Earl of Essex	Chancellor of the University of Dublin; 1601–1612	Succeeded by The Archbishop of Canterbury
Honorary titles
Vacant Title last held by The Lord Burghley	Lord Lieutenant of Hertfordshire; 1605–1612	Succeeded by The Earl of Salisbury
Preceded by The Viscount Howard of Bindon	Lord Lieutenant of Dorset; 1611–1612; With: The Earl of Suffolk	Succeeded by The Earl of Suffolk
Peerage of England
New creation	Earl of Salisbury; 1605–1612	Succeeded by William Cecil
New creation	Viscount Cranborne; 1604–1612	Succeeded by William Cecil
New creation	Baron Cecil; 1603–1612	Succeeded by William Cecil
Head of State of the Isle of Man
Preceded by Henry Howard	Lord of Mann; 1608–1609	Succeeded by William Stanley
