= Case of Prohibitions =

1608 English constitutional law case

- King James I in 1606
- Court: Court of Common Pleas
- Citations: [1608] EWHC J23 (KB), (1607) 77 ER 1342, 12 Coke Reports 64, 4 Inst 41

Keywords
- Judicial review

Case of Prohibitions [1607] EWHC J23 (KB) is a UK constitutional law case decided by Sir Edward Coke. (Note: Strictly, an English constitutional law case as the United Kingdom did not come into existence until 1801, but the precedent continues to be observed in modern UK law.) Before the Glorious Revolution of 1688, when the sovereignty of Parliament was confirmed, this case wrested supremacy from the King in favour of the courts.

== Facts ==
King James I placed himself in the position of judge for a dispute, a "controversy of land between parties was heard by the King, and sentence given".

== Judgments ==
When the case went before Edward Coke, the Chief Justice of the Court of Common Pleas, he overturned the decision of the King, and held that cases may be tried only by those with legal training and subject to the rule of law. Coke stated that common law cases were "not to be decided by natural reason but by artificial reason and judgment of law, which law is an art which requires long study and experience":

A controversy of land between parties was heard by the King, and sentence given, which was repealed for this, that it did not belong to the common law: then the King said, that he thought the law was founded upon reason, and that he and others had reason, as well as the Judges: to which it was answered by me, that true it was, that God had endowed His Majesty with excellent science, and great endowments of nature; but His Majesty was not learned in the laws of his realm of England, and causes which concern the life, or inheritance, or goods, or fortunes of his subjects, are not to be decided by natural reason but by the artificial reason and judgment of law, which law is an act which requires long study and experience, before that a man can attain to the cognizance of it: that the law was the golden met-wand and measure to try the causes of the subjects; and which protected His Majesty in safety and peace: with which the King was greatly offended, and said, that then he should be under the law, which was treason to affirm, as he said; to which I said, that Bracton saith, quod Rex non debet esse sub homine, sed sub Deo et lege [That the King ought not to be under any man but under God and the law.].

In another report, Coke is quoted as saying all causes were "to be measured by the golden and straight met-wand of the law, and not to the incertain and crooked cord of discretion".

== See also ==
- United Kingdom constitutional law – Law that constitutes the body politic of the United Kingdom
- European Union law
- Dr. Bonham's Case – Case decided in 1610 in England
- Case of Proclamations – 1610 English constitutional law case

== Sources ==
- Owen Hood Phillips, Leading Cases in Constitutional Law (Sweet & Maxwell, London, 1957) Ch. 13, pp 46–47
