= Pauline Croft =

English historian, professor, and writer

Pauline Croft is an English historian, professor, and writer. She is a reader in history at the Royal Holloway, University of London. She has published on the 16th and 17th centuries (part of early modern Britain) in British history.

== Major works ==
- King James, by Pauline Croft (2003). Published by Palgrave Macmillan. ISBN 978-0-333-61396-2

James I was the first Stuart king of England. In his 2003 review of Croft's book, the historian John Cramsie considered Croft's work the best overview of James's reign.
