= Impositions =

The Crown of England traditionally exercised the right to impose import duties for the regulation of trade and the protection of domestic industry. New impositions of this kind were imposed by Elizabeth I on currants and tobacco (1601) and extended by King James I to most imports (1608) after a favourable ruling in Bates' Case (1606). John Bates was a merchant from the Levant Company who refused to pay the import duty on currants.

In the face of Parliament's angry protests in 1610, the tax was amended to ensure that the greatest impact fell on foreign merchants.

Impositions were among the prerogative rights that King James I was to give up under the Great Contract of 1610, as drawn up by Lord Treasurer Robert Cecil, then Lord Salisbury, in return for an immediate sum to pay off Royal debt and an annual subsidy that would greatly increase income. However negotiations fell through, mainly because both sides kept changing what they wanted out of the Contract.

The prerogative of imposing any kind of tax without parliamentary authority was ultimately abolished as part of the Glorious Revolution with the Bill of Rights 1689.
