= Bates's Case =

British constitutional law case

Bates's Case or the Case of Impositions (1606) 2 St Tr 371 is a UK constitutional law case of the Court of the Exchequer, which enabled the King to impose duties for trade.

== Facts ==
John Bates was a merchant of the Levant Company. He refused to pay the import duty on currants imposed by James I, claiming that this imposition was illegal unless approved by Parliament. The matter was taken to the Court of the Exchequer.

== Judgement ==
The Court of the Exchequer held that Bates had to pay the duty. The Crown could impose the duty as it pleased to regulate trade. The Court could not go behind the King’s statement that the duty was indeed imposed for the purpose of regulating trade.

The power of the king is both ordinary and absolute. Ordinary power, which exists for the purpose of civil justice, is unalterable save by consent of Parliament. Absolute power, existing for the nation's safety, varies with the royal wisdom.

It followed that the Crown could impose a duty on imported currants if this was done to regulate foreign trade, and not simply to raise revenue.

== Significance ==
The case had the effect that such impositions were extended, giving the Treasury a "windfall". Robert Cecil realised that this judgement could provide extra income for the Crown.

In the long run, if the Crown could levy taxes without resorting to Parliament, one of the main reasons for that body's existence might disappear, thus perhaps allowing the King to dispense with Parliaments altogether, although this did not really become apparent until the reign of Charles I.

Sir Richard Lane's Reports in the court of exchequer, published posthumously in 1657, contained an important report of Sir Thomas Fleming's opinion in this case.

Chief Baron Fleming, who came from a family of merchants, displayed a notable contempt for the business community in his opinion. To the argument that the common good requires merchants to have unrestricted access to foreign markets, he made the scathing reply that "the end of every private merchant is not the common good but his particular profit".

== See also ==
- UK constitutional law
- International trade law

== Sources ==
- Phillips, Walter Alison (1911). "Bates, John" . Encyclopædia Britannica. Vol. 3 (11th ed.). pp. 509–510.
