= Great Contract =

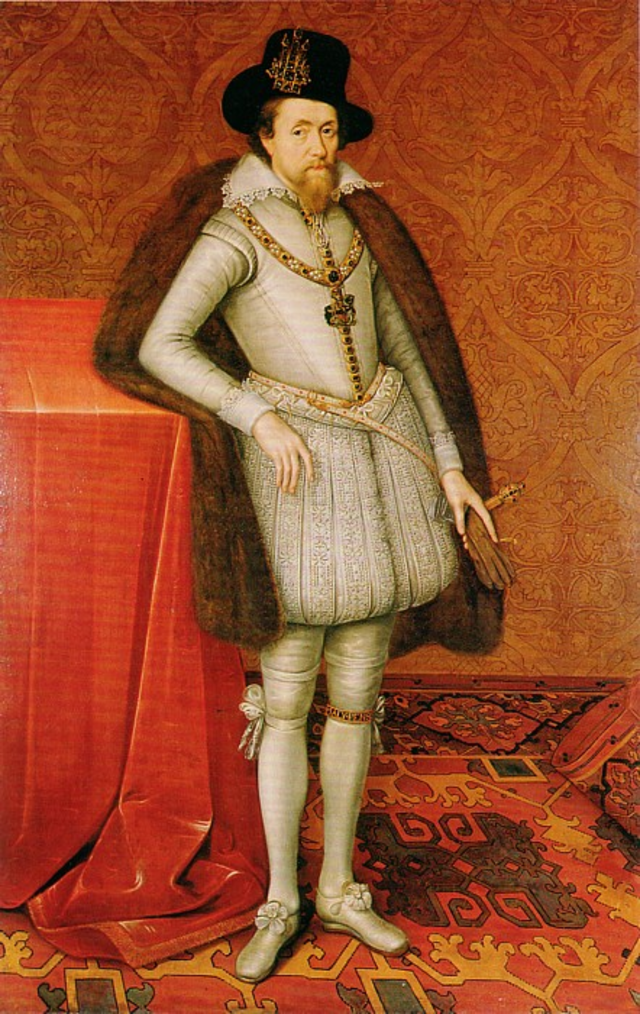
Portrait of James VI and 1, c. 1606, by John de Critz

The Great Contract was a plan submitted to James I and Parliament in 1610 by Robert Cecil. It was an attempt to increase Crown income and ultimately rid it of debt.

Cecil suggested that, in return for an annual grant of £200,000, the Crown should give up its feudal rights of Wardship and Purveyance, as well as the power of creating new impositions. The Commons were allergic to the idea of permanent taxation, particularly for the benefit of the spendthrift James, but eventually accepted Cecil's proposal, though they offered far less than he had hoped for. The contract was duly formalised, but during the parliamentary recess members were made aware that their constituents were implacably opposed to it. The plan was eventually rejected by both James and Parliament: the failure of his cherished project was thought by some to have hastened Cecil's early death in 1612, although it is most likely that he died of cancer. The King withdrew from the contract because it meant that he would lose a useful means of controlling his more powerful subjects, and he also did not think £200,000 was a worthy substitute for his feudal rights. The House of Commons withdrew because they were wary of providing an income that might give the King financial independence.

Whether it would have helped the financial situation remains a matter of speculation. It has been argued that the financial settlement at the Restoration of Charles II was partly inspired by the Great Contract. On the other hand, James I was rather extravagant in financial matters, and it is uncertain whether the Contract would have been a permanent solution to his difficulties. It is also important to consider how, at the point of Elizabeth's death, the Crown was £400,000 in debt, considering that Elizabeth ran a rather frugal court and was careful with money, and thus the financial problems of James' reign were not all of his own making. Furthermore, it must also be said that James, who had a wife and, by 1605, four children to support, had many legitimate expenses which the unmarried and childless Elizabeth did not.

== See also ==
- Tenures Abolition Act 1660
- Civil List
