= Death and funeral of James VI and I =

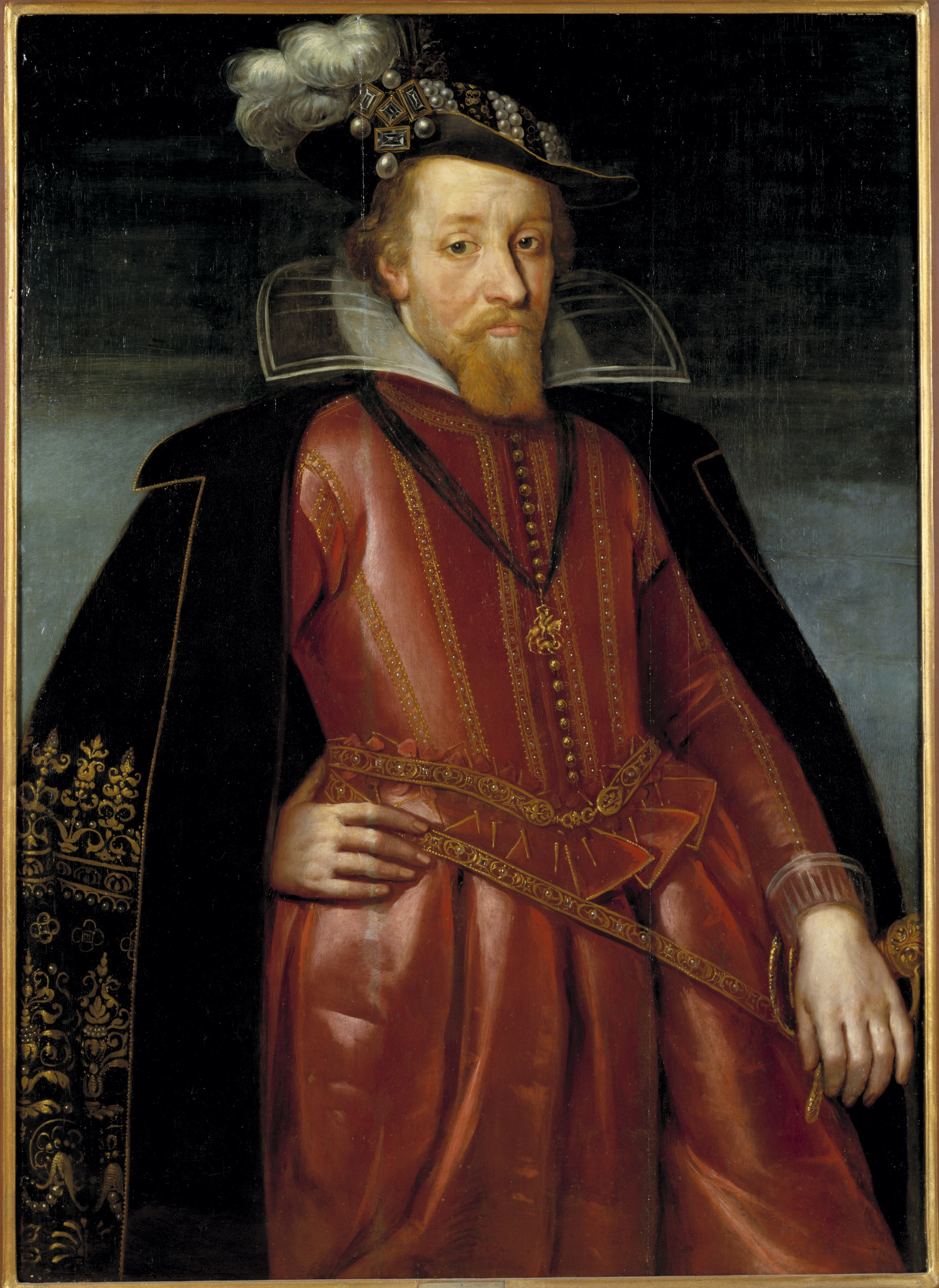
James VI and I (1566–1625) wearing the Three Brothers jewel

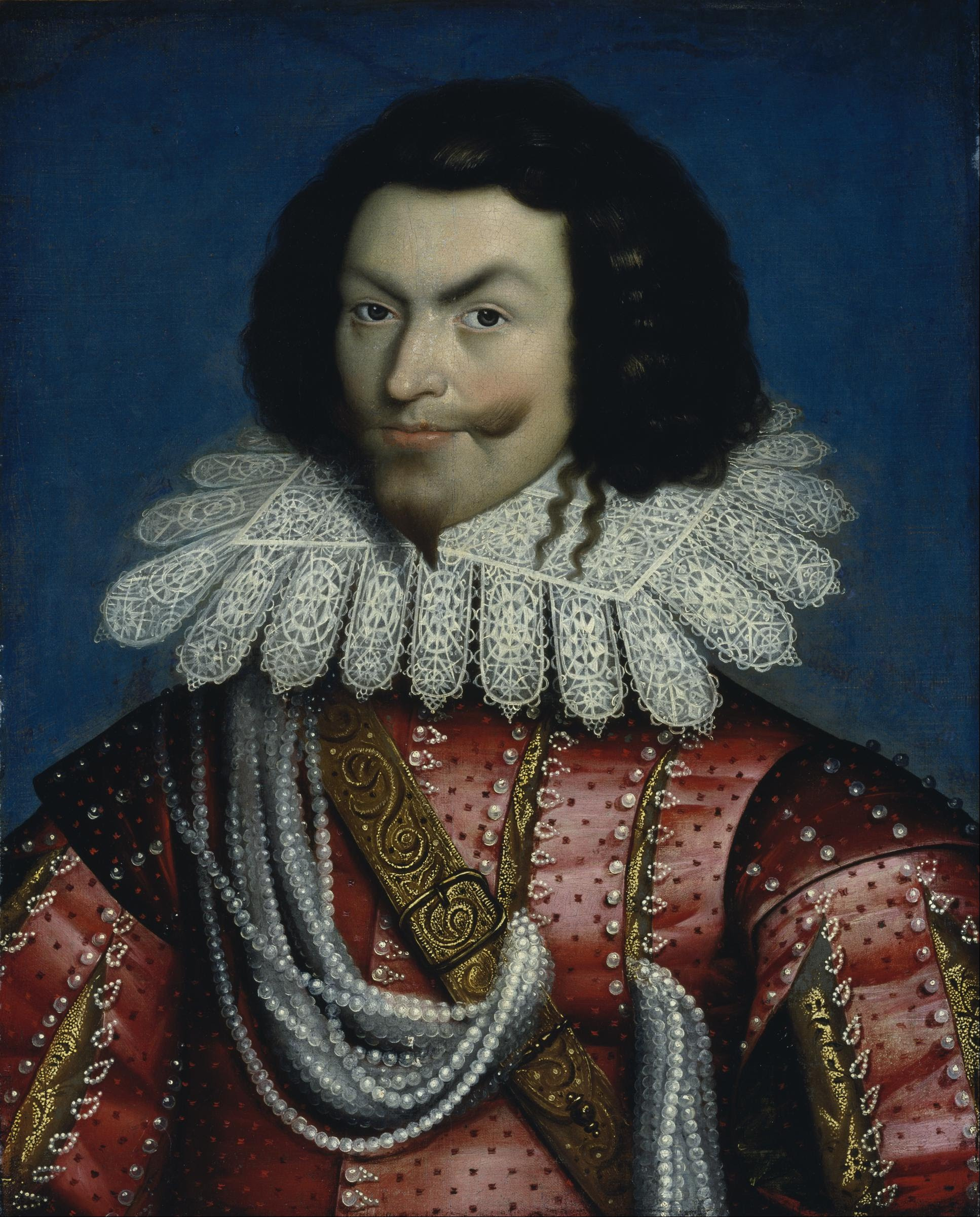
The Duke of Buckingham was involved in disagreements about medical interventions

James VI and I (1566–1625), King of England, Scotland, and Ireland, died on 27 March 1625 at Theobalds, and was buried at Westminster Abbey on 7 May 1625.

== Poor health ==
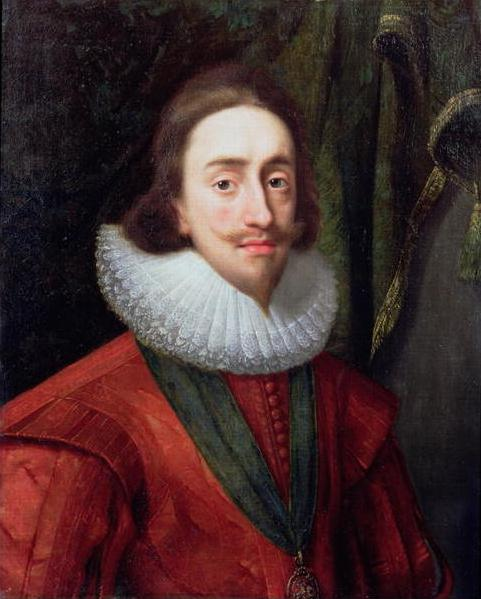
Charles I was proclaimed "King of Great Britain, France, and Ireland" at the Mercat cross of Edinburgh

In his later years King James was sometimes immobilised by illnesses. In April 1619 he had to travel in a litter, and then was carried in a chair. Although King James became increasingly infirm, he continued to ride and hunt. It was said that he found bathing his feet in the belly of the deer helpful. John Chamberlain thought the inclusion of sweet wines and fruit was less beneficial. In December 1624, Oliver Browne, an upholsterer and furniture maker, provided six portable chairs to use at the hunt, and six special chairs to lift him to and from his bed.

In January 1625, John Chamberlain wrote that James had "been of late so troubled with pain and weakness in his feet that he looked little abroad", but was travelling against medical advice to see his new hawks fly at Newmarket. He spoke in Parliament in February.

== At Theobalds ==
The King's final illness included a fever, described as a "tertian ague". He seems to have had a combination of kidney disease and arthritis. The events of the king's final days proved controversial with allegations of inappropriate or ill-advised medical interventions. When King James was on his deathbed at Theobalds, it was said that Mary Villiers, Countess of Buckingham had arranged for his treatment with a plaster or poultice applied to his chest, stomach, and wrist. This angered his Scottish-born physician John Craig who rebuked her. For his speeches to the Countess, Craig was ordered to leave court. The Earl of Kellie, a Scottish courtier, described the rumour and the Duke of Buckingham's anger at it:

There has something fallen out here much disliked, and I for myself think much mistaken, and that is this. My Lord of Bukkinghame wishing mutche the Kings healthe caused splaister to be applyed to the Kings breast, after which his Majesty was extremely sick, and with all did give him a drink or syrup to drink; and this was which has spread such a business here and discontent as you would wonder, and Doctor Craig is now absented from court and Harry Gibb of the bedchamber is quarrelled for it (blamed), and my Lord Buckingham so incensed".

Buckingham's doctor, John Remington, is known to have attended James at Theobalds in March 1625. He gave the Duke's servant and barber John Baker a recipe for a drink called a julep or posset. John Baker applied a plaster to help the king's ague, and Prince Charles made him eat a piece of it to show it was safe.

Henry Gibb removed the controversial plaster at the king's request during the night of 21 March. One of the physicians William Paddy, later wrote in one of the king's prayer books that he had told James that the end was near, "Being sent for to Theobalds but two days before the death of my sovereign lord and master king James, I felt it my Christian duty to prepare him, telling that there was nothing left for me to do (in the afternoon before his death the next day at noon) but to pray for his soul".

James died on Sunday 27 March at noon. After the king's death, Remington and other physicians including Matthew Lister disputed the provenance and composition of a medical plaster found on the body. Subsequently, George Eglisham amplified rumours by publishing the Forerunner of Revenge, a pamphlet blaming Buckingham and his doctors for hastening the king's death. The circumstances of the king's treatment and the plasters applied were investigated by a House of Commons select committee.

== A new king proclaimed at Theobalds ==
King Charles was proclaimed at the gate of Theobalds by the Knight Marshal, Edward Zouch. According to James Howell, Zouche mistakenly proclaimed Charles the "dubitable heir" at Theobalds. He was corrected by Secretary Conway. Howell included this story in a letter to his father, printed in his Epistolae Ho-Elianae.

The Earl of Kellie advised that proclamations should speak of the "King of Great Britain", rather than putting one nation of the Union first, as in "England and Scotland" or "Scotland and England". The proclamation sent for reading at the Mercat cross of Edinburgh accordingly referred to the "late King of Grite Britane, France and Ireland". A messenger was sent to Elizabeth Stuart, Queen of Bohemia, at The Hague with money and black cloth to place her household in mourning.

A commission of Earls met in the council chamber at Whitehall Palace to determine the detail of the funeral and processions. The sculptor Maximilian Colt went to Theobalds to make the king's death mask. After an autopsy, the king's body was embalmed, and soldered into a lead coffin by Abraham Greene. The coffin was placed on a carriage at Theobalds and brought to Denmark House on the Strand in the early hours of the morning. A torchlight procession through the streets of London was spoiled by foul weather.

Charles I made a gift of the silver plate used by his late father in his bedchamber to the Earl of Kellie on 5 April 1625.

== Denmark House ==
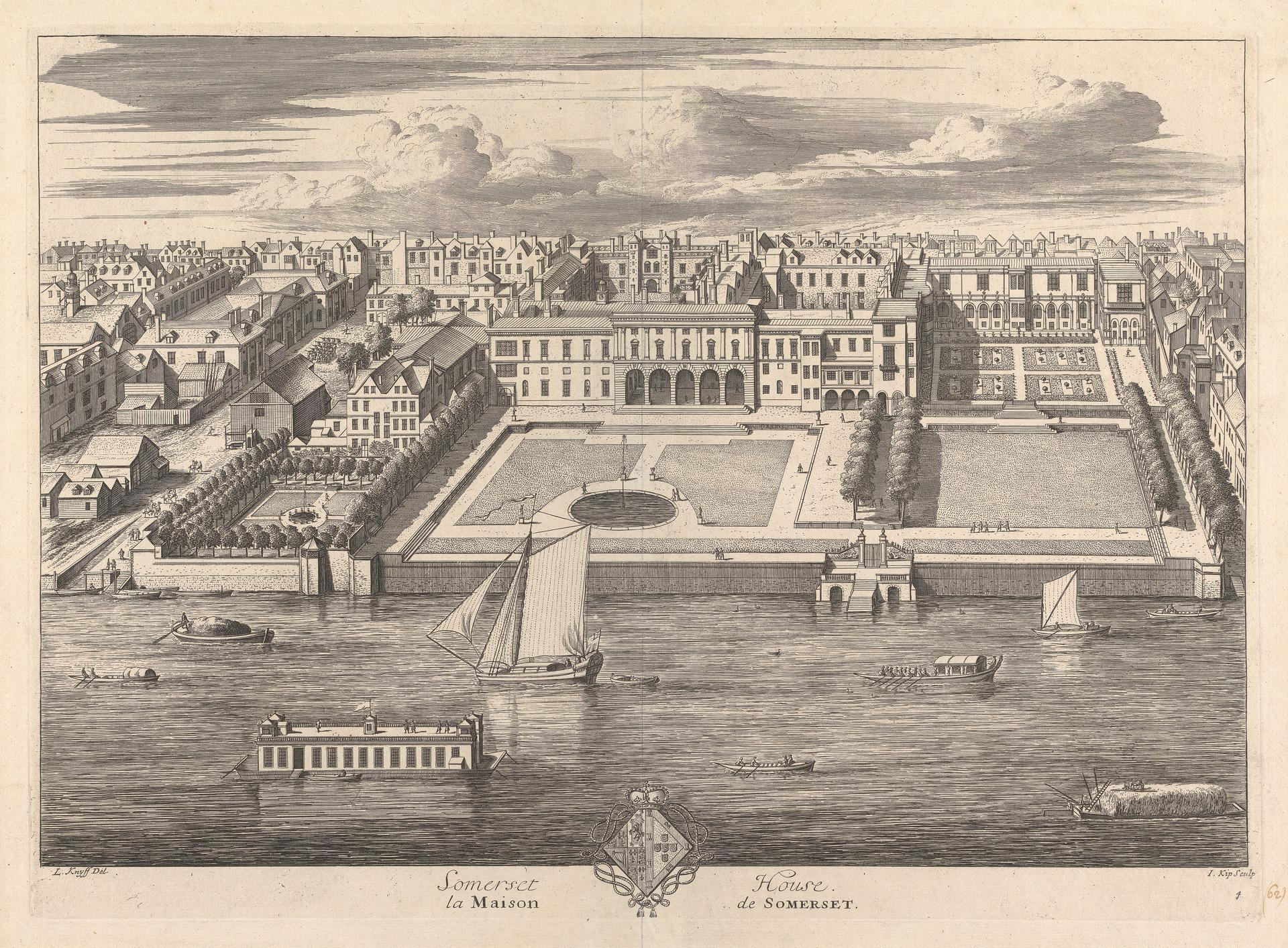
The body of James VI and I and his funeral effigy rested in rooms draped with black cloth at Somerset House, then known as "Denmark House" in honour of his wife Anne of Denmark (died in 1619)

The aristocrats at court were expected to follow the cortège from Theobalds or await the arrival of the body at Somerset House, then known as Denmark House. Instead, the Earls of Roxburghe and Morton went out of London to make merry with Lucy Russell, Countess of Bedford at Moor Park. This "absurdity" caused comment and remark.

The body of King James lay in state at Denmark House. The rooms were draped with black cloth and the coffin covered with black velvet. A lifelike wooden effigy of the king was placed on top, dressed in royal robes. The room was lit with six silver candlesticks that Prince Charles had bought in Spain in 1623.

The King's former servants watched at Denmark House, and they became anxious that they might lose their positions and lodgings. It was thought that Charles would keep them on and let his old servants go. Easter Day was April 17. There was plague in London and Dover. John Donne preached at Denmark House on 26 April, in the Great Hall, as there was no chapel in the building. The king's body was moved from the bedchamber to the privy chamber at the end of April. Two days before the funeral, the effigy was moved into the Great Hall at Denmark House, a room with a bay window, which was now decorated and draped in black like a funerary chapel. Charles I attended while the body was placed in the presence chamber.

Charles I stayed at Whitehall Palace where the chapel was draped with black cloth like the rooms at Denmark House. The Duke of Buckingham stayed in an adjacent room. Charles began to enforce stricter etiquette at the palace than his late father. Lucy, Countess of Bedford, compared the new formality to the court of Elizabeth I.

== Holyrood Palace ==
In Scotland, rooms at Holyrood Palace were also draped with symbolic black cloth. The cloth was supplemented with wall paintings by James Warkman. In 1626 the cloth was given to the keepers of the palace and Warkman painted over the black decoration, but traces remain behind later panelling.

== Funeral at Westminster ==
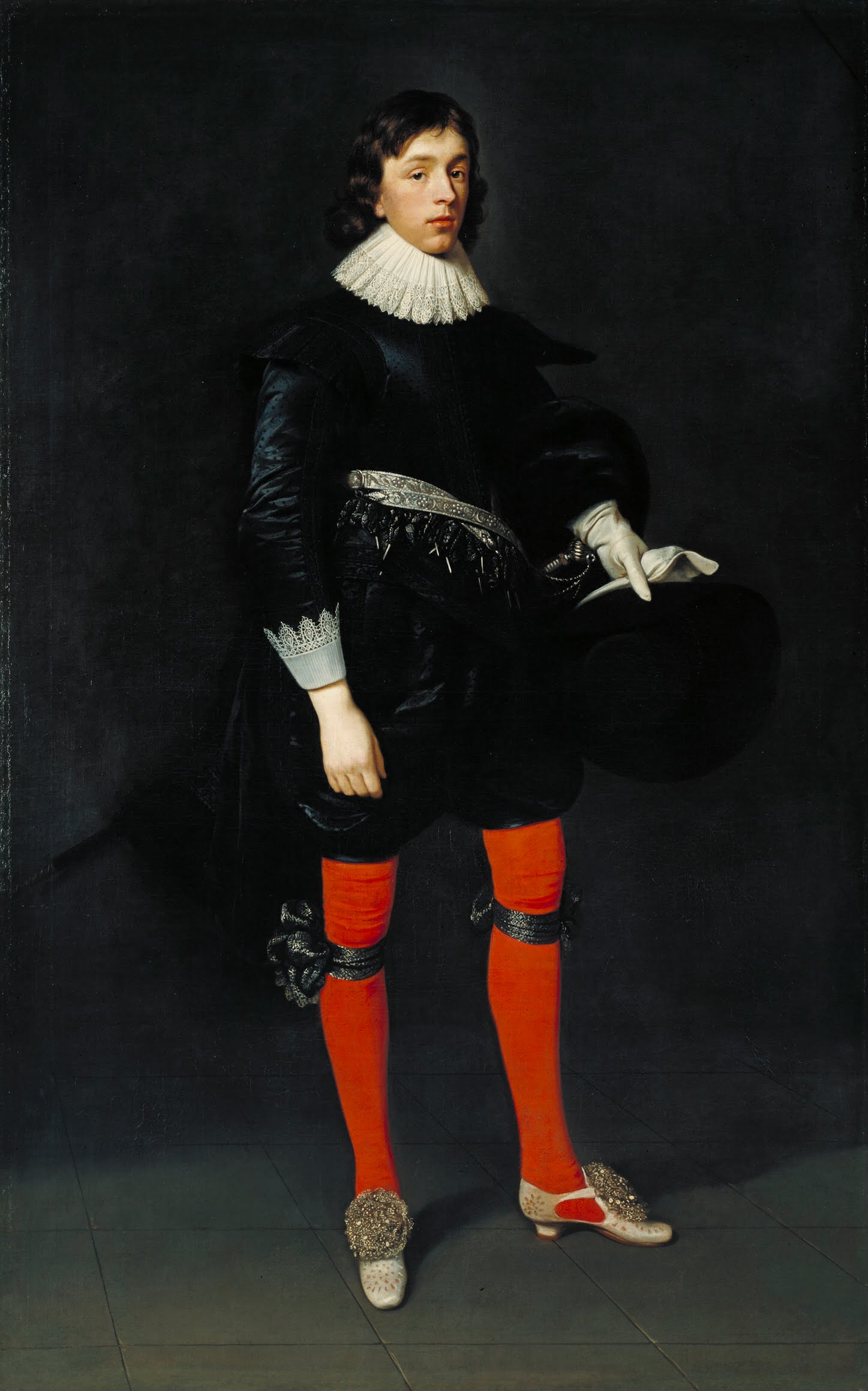
James Hamilton, Marquess of Hamilton held the train of Charles I as Chief Mourner

Black mourning cloth was provided for 9,000 people to attend the funeral. One London draper, Walter Coventry, supplied black cloth worth £1,762. A number of servants, gunners, and former members of the household of Anne of Denmark petitioned the committee for an allowance of mourning livery, including Robert and John Wood who had kept the king's cormorants for 16 years. The hearse used in the Abbey was designed by Inigo Jones. Some of the statuary and decoration was made by Hubert Le Sueur. The hearse was covered with black velvet by the king's upholsterers Oliver Browne and John Baker.

A second fully articulated effigy for the Abbey was made by Maximilian Colt. Colt had made a wax death mask of the king's face at Theobalds to model these effigies. The wigs for the effigies were made by Daniel Parkin or Parkes. The faces were painted by Colt and John de Critz. Colt also made a crown for the effigy set with counterfeit jewels, an orb, and a sceptre, which were gilded by John de Critz. The effigy had joints for "severall postures". De Critz also provided heraldic funerary hatchments and banners for Denmark House and the Abbey.

James VI and I was buried at Westminster Abbey on the evening before the funeral. Charles I was the chief mourner on the day of the state funeral. He walked from Somerset House to the Abbey. In the procession, the "Banner of the Union of the two Crosses of England and Scotland" was carried by Lord Willoughby de Ersesby. Simonds D'Ewes was among the spectators on the Strand by Somerset House.

As the king's effigy was placed in Inigo Jones's hearse or catafalque in the choir of Abbey, the Catholic ambassadors left the building. John Williams, Bishop of Lincoln, gave a two-hour sermon. John Chamberlain wrote that "all was performed with great magnificence, but the order was very confused and disorderly". He heard the ceremony cost over £50,000.

A diplomat from Tuscany, Alessandro Antelminelli alias Amerigo Salvetti of Lucca, described the procession from Denmark House and the funeral. Williams (whose sermon was published) and Donne both discussed King James as Rex Pacificus a peacemaking king, and a modern Solomon.

There was no monument for James at the Abbey, although he commissioned monuments for Elizabeth I, his mother Mary, Queen of Scots, and his own English-born daughters Mary and Sophia. The place of his interment was rediscovered by Dean Stanley in February 1869 in the vault containing the coffins of Henry VII of England and Elizabeth of York. The body of his wife, Anne of Denmark, had been buried nearby on 13 May 1619. The antiquary John Dart saw a labelled urn containing the embalmed organs of Anne of Denmark in 1718, which he thought had been moved in 1674 during the reburial of the Princes in the Tower. A similar urn for King James was not found in 1869.

== Attendants at the funeral ==
The chief mourner was Charles I. His supporters were the Earls of Arundel and Rutland. His train was carried by the Duke of Lennox, the Marquess of Hamilton, the Earl of Denbigh, and Lords Maltravers and Strange. The king's two attendants were Robert Kerr of the bedchamber and James Fullerton, Groom of the Stool. There were 14 Earls as assistants to the chief mourner.

The Earl of Nithsdale was an Earl Assistant. The other Scottish earls at the ceremony, not among the "close mourners", included; Linlithgow, Home, Wigton, Tullibardine, Roxburghe, Kellie, Buccleuch, Melrose, Annandale, and Lauderdale.

Robert Gordon of Gordonstoun wrote that the "funerals were magnificentlie and sumptouslie performed", noting that King Charles followed the hearse on foot from Denmark-House to Westminster. Gordon was present at the private burial of King James at midnight on 4 May with the Earl of Kellie and Francis Stuart. Gordon states that the Duke of Buckingham failed to come to Theobalds and Denmark-House while King James lay in state. He also claims that the King's body had no covering other than a white bedsheet for eight days at Theobalds.

== The king's jewels ==
Later in the year, a scheme was devised by the Duke of Buckingham to raise money by pawning the king's jewels at The Hague and Amsterdam, in part to meet commitments to be made by the Treaty of The Hague (1625). On 8 November 1625, Spencer, Lord Compton, who served as Master of the King's Robes delivered jewels to two courtiers of Charles I, Lord Conway and Endymion Porter, at Hampton Court. These included the famous diamond hat jewel known as the Mirror of Great Britain (now configured with a diamond instead of a ruby, which James had given to Anne of Denmark), a gold feather set with diamonds, a jewel called the "Brethren" or the "Three Brothers", collets (segments set with precious stones) from collars with the ciphers of Anne of Denmark and James, a hatband of two ropes of pearls, and a jewel in shape of an initial "J" or "I". The "J" was also a hat badge, and had been made by the goldsmiths William Herrick and John Spilman in 1603 or 1604. It included two balas rubies and a great and a small diamond, and a lozenge diamond taken from a jewel in Anne of Denmark's collection.

The Dutch were reluctant to lend money on the jewels, considering they were annexed as crown jewels, rather than royal personal property, and the English Parliament could object. Nevertheless, some of pieces were pawned by the Duke of Buckingham and his agent Sackville Crowe, and in 1634 were in the hands of Garret van Schoonhoven and Francis Vanhoven of Amsterdam.
