= Ralph Grynder =

London-based furniture maker and upholsterer

Ralph Grynder or Grinder (died 1654) was a London-based furniture maker and upholsterer who worked for Charles I of England and Henrietta Maria. He bought and sold art treasures from the Royal Collection in 1651.

== Career ==
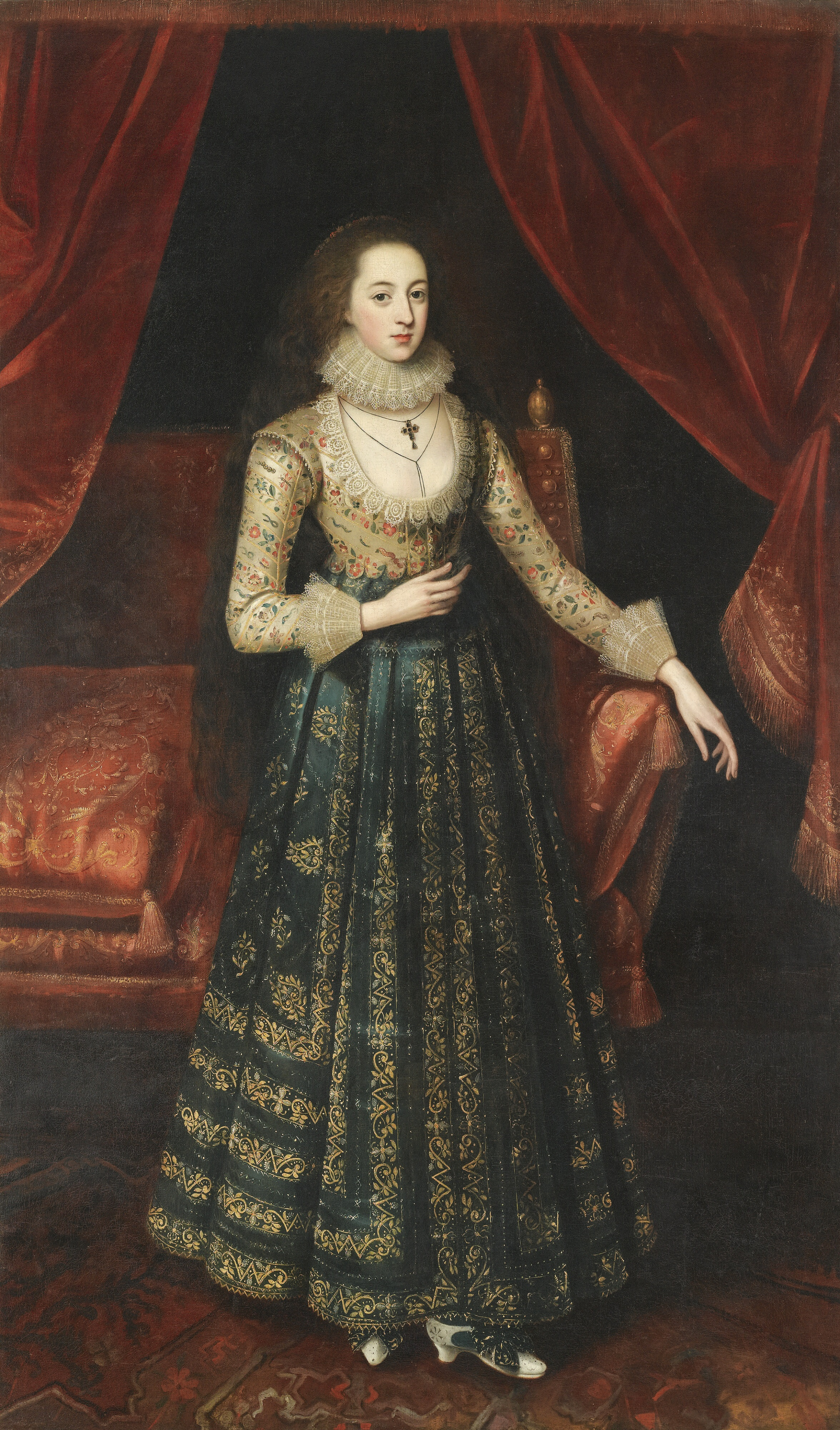
Portrait of a lady circa 1619, with sofa and canopy, Dunham Massey, National Trust

Grynder was an apprentice of the Draper's Company in 1605. Later, he lived and worked at the sign of the Lion in the Poultry, London. Possibly, Grynder was a Catholic. Upholsterers supplied new furniture to aristocrat's houses and were the major figures in interior decoration. Grynder and other tradesmen were questioned in the Court of Chancery about the possessions of William Cecil, 16th Baron Ros in 1617.

He worked with the silkman Benjamin Henshawe in the 1620s, making beds, couches, chairs, and cushions. When Henrietta Maria came to England in 1625 as the bride of Charles I, she was accompanied by the Duke and Duchess of Chevreuse. Their lodgings were furnished with pieces hired from Grynder.

Grynder supplied green cotton matting and 2,000 black tacks to cover the floor of a room at Somerset House for a masque in 1626 which involved a performance by Jeffrey Hudson. The cloth was used to muffle noise. Grynder features as a supplier in later accounts for Henrietta Maria's masques and pastorals, including The Shepherd's Paradise.

In 1628, Grynder was asked to appraise the inventory of the Jesuit College in Clerkenwell, London. The inventory was taken by Justinian Povey, a royal auditor, and George Longe.

He made couches for Henrietta Maria in the 1630s and these were supplied with suites of matching chairs and stools with a canopy suspended above. These commissions can be associated with the surviving Knole sofa. Grynder's bills include:

For making a lardge couch bedd of figured velvett with two heades the seat being fitted on with staples and garnished round with fringes & ovr. styles and feete, £3-0-0.
For workmanship in making a Lardge Couch chayre of brancht velvett being covered all over on rayles styles and feete with 2 cushion winges garnished with silver fringes, £4-0-0.

Grynder may have worked with the joiner Charles Godeliere, who was a member of the French Church at Threadneedle Street. Other furniture makers and suppliers to court circles at this time include John Baker and Oliver Browne. Some furniture was painted by the sergeant painter John de Critz or specialists like Thomas Capp and the gilder Philip Bromefield.

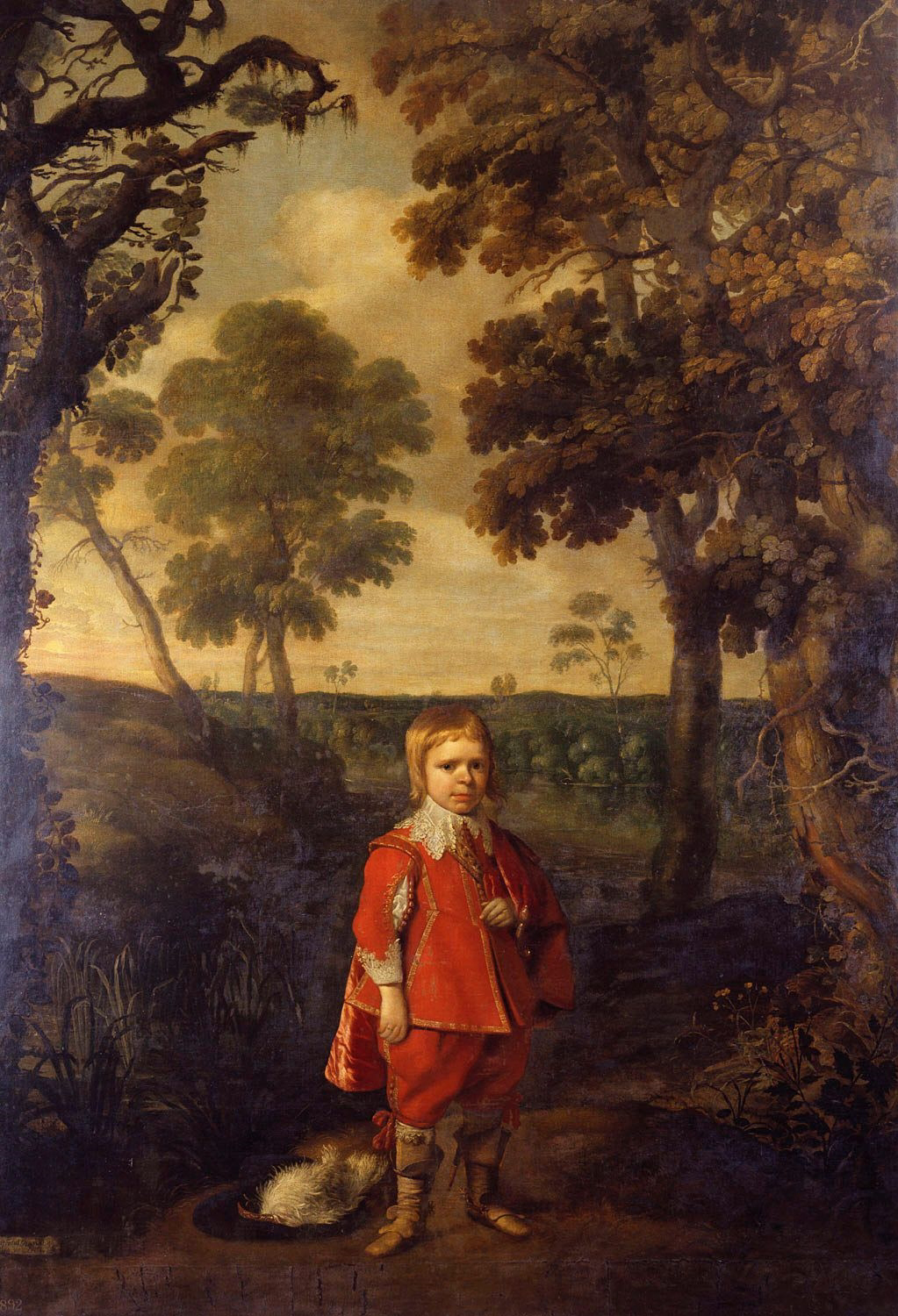
Grynder acquired the portrait of Jeffrey Hudson in a landscape by Daniel Mytens

Grynder provided a fringe of "Turkey orange of worsted" for the bed curtains of the bed of Little Sarah, a servant of Henrietta Maria, and a bed with a "round French canopy" for Jeffrey Hudson. In 1632, his two workmen were employed at Somerset House putting up a bed. He supplied "French chairs" to the Queen's House at Greenwich in 1637, upholstered with figured velvet and silver fringes, and used trimmings supplied by William Geere. In June 1640, Rachel Bourchier, Countess of Bath bought nails supplied by "Mr Grinder".

Dorothy Sidney, Countess of Leicester, as the wife of the English ambassador in Paris, was involved in the bespeaking of beds provided for Thomas Wentworth, 1st Earl of Strafford. She recommended that Ralph Grynder's workshop supply the woodwork of the beds and the matching suites of chairs and stools, because he was "the best in that trade".

He worked for the Earl of Antrim and his wife, Katherine Villiers, Duchess of Buckingham, in 1638 and 1639. They owed him £761-18s. An inventory of their furniture from Dunluce Castle includes couches and beds possibly supplied by Grynder. Furniture for Duchess in previous years was supplied by her wardrobe keeper Thomas Lovett. Their debt to Grynder remained outstanding, and in 1660, Mary Grinder, probably his widow, signed a joint petition for payment. His first wife, Anne Grinder, had committed suicide in 1626 after losing her child. She was buried at St Stephen Coleman Street. He had a son, Ralph Grynder junior, also a member of the draper's company.

== Grynder's dividend ==
Grynder and Charles Moseley were owed money by Sir Charles Cavendish, the owner of Bolsover Castle, and they could not be paid or receive land instead in 1649, because Cavendish was sequestered as a royalist.

During the sales of the royal collection, in 1651, Grynder formed a syndicate or "dividend" with nine other speculators or creditors to buy artworks. The members of the dividends were mostly owed money by the former crown. The Committee for the sale of Late King's Goods accepted claims for payments from artisans and former royal servants (or their executors), named in the "necessitous list" and the "second list", including Grynder (owed £1000), John de Critz' son Emmanuel (£1500), Oliver Browne, Samuel Vincent the husband of the widow of the joiner Charles Godeliere (£100), the silkman William Geere, the mercer Philip Lazenby, the gilder Philip Bromefield, the arras workers (£400), the embroiderer Edmund Harrison (£800), the armourer Arnold Rotsipen, Henry Stone, the executors of the goldsmith Alexander Heriot (£600), Frederick the son of apothecary John Wolfgang Rumler, Ester the widow of Nicholas Briot (£160), Penelope the widow of the coffer-maker Henry Lewgar (£250), Elizabeth Sanderson for the saddler Abraham Abercromby, Philip Armstrong the executor of Archibald Armstrong (£80), Lettice Holcroft widow of Sir Henry Holcroft (£320), and musicians including Theophilus Lupo, Jeremy Heron (£14), and Jacques Gaultier (£150).

The names of Grynder's associates and members of the other dividends are listed in a manuscript at the Bodleian Library. The account of the Committee treasurer, Humphrey Jones, shows that the sale goods were valued at £135,484, of which £96,475 was for the necessitous creditors, and £26,500 given as a loan to the navy.

Grynder and his dividend acquired paintings of eleven emperors on horseback made by the workshop of Giulio Romano for the Palazzo Ducale, Mantua. Other items bought by Grynder's dividend included portraits of Jeffrey Hudson and Mary, Queen of Scots, by Daniël Mijtens and a ten-piece suite of tapestry of the Old and New Law which had belonged to Catherine of Aragon.

According to notes made by Richard Symonds, most of the dividend's pictures were kept at the house of Sir Peter Richards. Lord Savile bought a Madonna on a wooden panel for £250 which was too large to easily transport. It was said that the Earl of Pembroke had offered the late king £1000 for the painting, which was described in another list as the "Great Piece of the Nativity done by Julio".

The dividend also bought statues from the gardens of Whitehall Palace, including a life-size "Sabina fugitiva" for £600, a brass "Comedus" for £200, with a "Mercury" and a "Sleeping Cupid", both £6. Drawings exist in the Royal Collection of several of these sculptures: the "Sabina" resembles a classical type of a daughter of Niobe. These pieces had been brought from the collection of Vincenzo II Gonzaga, Duke of Mantua by Daniel Nys and Nicholas Lanier. Grynder acquired a suite of four paintings of the Labours of Hercules by Guido Reni which Nys had brought from Mantua, and these are now in the Louvre.

Grynder was a warden of the Draper's Company in 1653. He died in 1654. The Sabina was recovered for the Royal Collection at the Restoration by Colonel William Hawley, who received a fee of 20% of the value of each item. Hawley was a member of a committee which met at Somerset House to interview those who knew the whereabouts of royal art, including George Geldorp, John Michael Wright, and Edward Marshall.
