= John Wood (cormorant keeper) =

English cormorant keeper

John Wood was an English royal servant as keeper of cormorants for James VI and I from 1611.

King James became interested in keeping cormorants which could be trained to fish for his amusement. He may have been inspired by the traveller's accounts of cormorant fishing in China by Odoric of Pordenone, Galeote Pereira, and Juan González de Mendoza, which were translated into English and printed by Richard Hakluyt, R. Willes, and R. Parke.

The French ambassador Antoine Lefèvre de la Boderie reported the King's interest in fishing with cormorants in June 1609. He thought the sport might work at Fontainebleau and made inquiries about obtaining suitable birds. In May 1610, Louis Frederick, Duke of Württemberg-Montbéliard saw James at Thetford. After dinner, the king took a coach to the river Ouse or Thet to fish with birds. The birds had been trained by a "master" who was able to make them dive for fish and eels. He could make them disgorge the fish with a signal.

This was John Wood, who was officially appointed as "Master of the Royal Cormorants". In April 1611 he was paid £30 for his work training cormorants to fish. In May 1612 he was paid for acquiring more birds from the north.

Another member of the family, his son, Robert Wood, helped set up cormorant houses near Westminster Palace in 1618. The site was called the "vine garden", leased from Lord Danvers. Robert Wood was a keeper of cormorants, ospreys, and otters, and a brick shed was built to house the birds and otters. The vine garden was moated, and new work included nine fish-ponds fed by Thames water for cormorant training. The ponds were stocked with carp, tench, dace and "a good store of eels". The site in Millbank was in the area of Romney Street (formerly Vine Street) and Tufton Street.

In 1623 a servant of Francis Wortley stole a royal cormorant by forging a message, apparently as a practical joke.

== Cormorant diplomacy ==
In 1618, the King of France sent a gift of cormorants to King James. John Wood organised a fishing trip for the French ambassadors.

Robert Wood was sent to the Duke of Lorraine with a gift of cormorants in 1619. In February 1624, he was sent with six cormorants to the King of Poland. In 1624, Luke Wood carried three cormorants to Venice. He was detained by the Duke of Savoy, and subsequently a compensatory payment was made to Robert Wood.

After the death of King James, Robert and John Wood and other servants "in ordinary" who had kept the king's cormorants for 16 years petitioned for an allowance of black livery clothes to attend the king's funeral.

Robert Wood surrendered his position and fee to Richard Makin, the husband of Bathsua Makin in 1636. Wood also made the same bargain with William Melyn who was a broker in selling royal appointments. Richard Makin petitioned Charles I to try and recover the sum he had paid.
