= William Paddy =

English royal physician

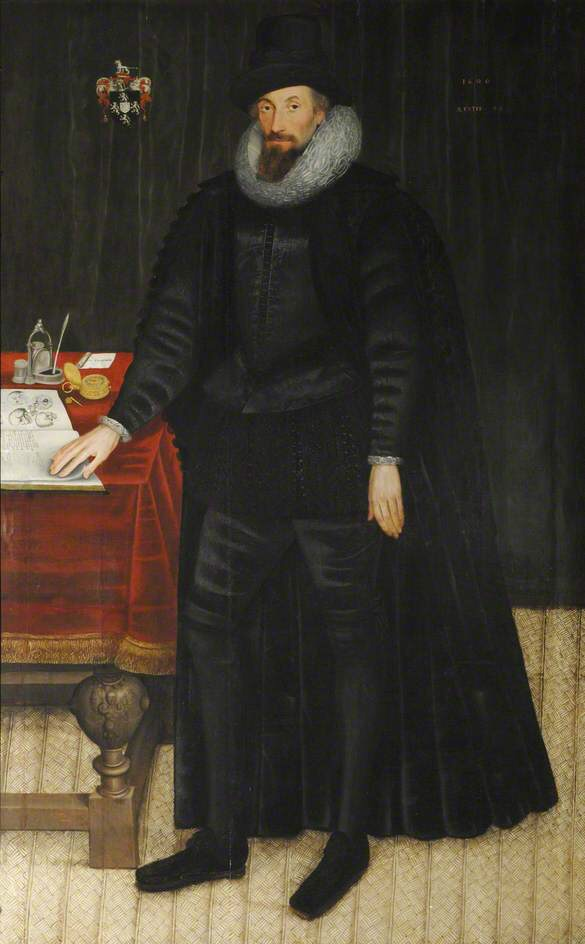
Portrait of Sir William Paddy, dated 1600. Collection of St. John's College, Oxford.

Sir William Paddy (1554–1634) was an English royal physician.

== Life ==
He was born in London, and entered Merchant Taylors' School in 1569, with schoolfellows Lancelot Andrewes, Giles Tomson, and Thomas Dove. In 1571 he entered as a commoner at St John's College, Oxford, and graduated B.A. in July 1573. On 21 July 1589 he graduated M.D. at Leiden University, and was incorporated on that degree at Oxford on 22 October 1591. He was elected a fellow of his college, where he was contemporary with his friend Matthew Gwinne.

He was examined at the College of Physicians of London on 23 December 1589, admitted a licentiate on 9 May 1590, and a fellow on 25 September 1591. He was elected a censor in 1595, and again from 1597 to 1600, and was four times president of the college (1609, 1610, 1611, and 1618). James I appointed him his physician in the first year of his reign, and knighted him at Windsor on 9 July 1603. When James I was at Oxford on 29 August 1605, Paddy argued before him against two medical theses, 'Whether the morals of nurses are imbibed by infants with the milk,' and 'Whether smoking tobacco is favourable to health.'

Paddy had a house at Blackfriars. In June 1600 Queen Elizabeth passed through this property during the wedding celebrations for Lady Anne Russell and Lord Herbert and Paddy gave her a fan. On 3 September 1609 Paddy's house was attacked by Sir John Kennedy of Barn Elms with a band of "furious Scots", because Kennedy's estranged wife Elizabeth Brydges was staying there. According to Dudley Carleton the raiders were equipped with hot irons ready to mutilate Paddy, suspected to be having an affair with Brydges.

In 1614 the College of Physicians appointed him to plead the immunity of the college from arms-bearing before the lord mayor, Sir Thomas Middleton, and the recorder, Sir Henry Montagu. He pointed out the Physicians Act 1523 and the Physicians Act 1540, which stated the privileges of physicians; he also maintained that physicians are by their science surgeons without further examination. The recorder decided in favour of the claim of the College. Paddy attained to a large practice, and enjoyed the friendship of Sir Theodore Mayerne and of Dr. Baldwin Hamey. Mayerne praises him in his preface to his edition of Thomas Muffett's Insectorum Theatrum (1634).

On 7 April 1620, with Matthew Gwinne, he was appointed a commissioner for garbling tobacco. Raphael Thorius alluded to this role in his Latin eulogy on Paddy in 1626.

He sat in parliament as member for Thetford, Norfolk, in 1604–11. He supported his fellow-collegian William Laud, and called on Thomas Sackville, 1st Earl of Dorset, then chancellor of Oxford, and spoke to him in praise of Laud's character and learning, to gather support for Laud's struggles with the Oxford Calvinists.

When in March 1625 James I was attacked by his final illness, complicating gout, of which he died, Paddy attended him at Theobalds. Paddy's copy of the Book of Common Prayer (ed. 1615), which was preserved in St. John's College, Oxford, contains a manuscript note which records the king's last profession of faith. Paddy wrote in the prayer book that he had told James that the end was near, "Being sent for to Theobalds but two days before the death of my sovereign lord and master king James, I felt it my Christian duty to prepare him, telling that there was nothing left for me to do (in the afternoon before his death the next day at noon) but to pray for his soul".

Paddy died in London on 22 December 1634. He was a munificent benefactor of his college at Oxford, to which he gave an organ, £1,800 for the improvement of the choir, and £1,000 towards the commons, as well as many volumes to the library. His tomb is in the chapel of St. John's College.

== Works ==
His only published work appeared in 1603, a copy of verses lamenting the death of Queen Elizabeth, beginning with the line 'Terminus huc rerum meus huc me terminus urget;' and after praise of her successor, of whom he says 'solus eris Solomon,' ending with the wish 'Sic tamen ut medica sis sine, salvus, ope.'
