= Bathsua Makin =

English linguist and feminist writer, c. 1600 – c. 1680

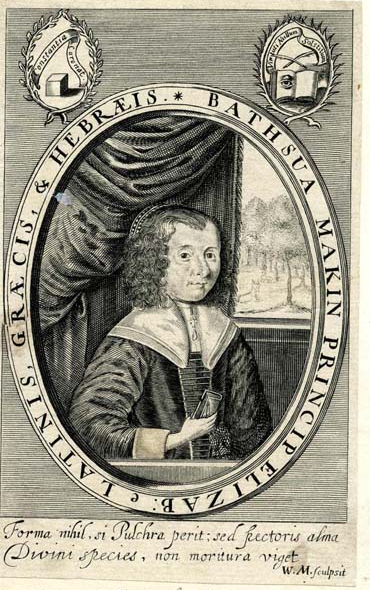
Bathsua Makin, chalcography of William Marshall, 1640–1648

Bathsua Reginald Makin (/ˈmækɪn/; c. 1600 – c. 1680) was a teacher who contributed to the emerging criticism of woman's position in the domestic and public spheres in 17th-century England. Herself a highly educated woman, Makin was referred to as England's most learned lady, skilled in Greek, Latin, Hebrew, German, Spanish, French and Italian. Makin argued primarily for the equal right of women and girls to obtain an education in an environment or culture that viewed woman as the weaker vessel, subordinate to man and uneducable. She is best known for her polemical treatise entitled An Essay to Revive the Ancient Education of Gentlewomen, in Religion, Manners, Arts & Tongues, with an Answer to the Objections against this Way of Education (1673).

== Life ==
She was born in 1600 and named after the biblical Bathsheba. Makin was the daughter of Henry Reginald or Reynolds, who was a schoolmaster of a school in Stepney and published a broadsheet of Latin poems and pamphlets on mathematical instruments. In 1616, Makin published Musa Virginea, a book with Latin, Greek, Hebrew, Spanish, French and German verse. The front piece announced that the author was "Bathsua R{eginald}, daughter of Henry Reginald, a schoolmaster and philologist of London".

In 1621 she married Richard Makin, a courtier. The couple moved to Westminster and had eight children.

Her sister Ithamaria married the mathematician John Pell in 1632. Makin corresponded with Pell. Manuscripts in the British Library reveal letters from Bathsua signed "your loving sister", along with letters written by Pell in which he refers to Bathsua as "sister". Thus, Makin has been wrongly identified as Pell's sister.

Makin maintained close friendships with the physicians George Eglisham and Baldwin Hamey.

== Employment as teacher ==
By 1640 Makin was known as the most learned woman in England. She was tutor to the children of Charles I of England, and governess to his daughter Elizabeth Stuart. When the Parliament of England took Princess Elizabeth Stuart into custody at the beginning of the English Civil War, Makin stayed with the girl as her servant. When the princess died in 1650, Makin was granted a pension for her services but was unable to ever collect it.

Makin was also tutor to Lady Elizabeth Langham (née Hastings), daughter of Ferdinando Hastings, 6th Earl of Huntingdon, probably until her marriage in 1652.

As her husband was absent during the civil war, Makin raised their children alone. He died in 1659. Her sister died two years later.

== School ==
By 1673 Makin and Mark Lewis had established a school for gentlewomen in Tottenham High Cross, then four miles out of London. Elizabeth Drake, the mother of Elizabeth Montagu, and Sarah Scott are said to have been educated at the school. The school at which Makin was governess taught music, song and dance, as well as writing in English, keeping accounts, Latin and French. If students wished they could also learn Greek, Hebrew, Italian and Spanish.

In 1673 Makin circulated a pamphlet entitled "An Essay to Revive the Ancient Education of Gentlewomen", which argued the case for educating women.

== Writings ==
=== Influences ===
Makin maintained correspondence with the Dutch scholar Anna Maria van Schurman and Schurman refers to Makin in a letter to Simonds d'Ewes which was published with the English translation of Schurman's treatise in support of women's education "The Learned Maid" in 1659. d'Ewes was a former pupil of Makin's father and is the source for the claim that she was the greatest scholar of any woman in England. Makin praises Schurman in her An Essay to Revive the Ancient Education of Gentlewomen, published 1673. Makin and van Schurman both maintain that only women with enough time, wealth, and basic intelligence should receive a humanist education. Mary Astell would echo Makin's arguments in "A Serious Proposal to the Ladies, Part I" published in 1694. Makin, like her contemporary Diana Primrose, relied on Queen Elizabeth I and the humanist education she received at a young age, to support her arguments for the education of women. Makin also cited Margaret Roper and Anne Cooke Bacon as authoritative models for the claim that women's education would have a pious benefit for the state. Like Anne Askew, whose writings had been published 1563 by John Foxe in Acts and Monuments and which had shaped the English Reformation, Makin argued that "our very Reformation of Religion, seems to be begun and carried on by Women."

Makin was also influenced by the writings of John Amos Comenius and adhered to his advice that vernacular (ordinary) language should be used instead of Latin when teaching.

=== An Essay to Revive the Ancient Education of Gentlewomen ===
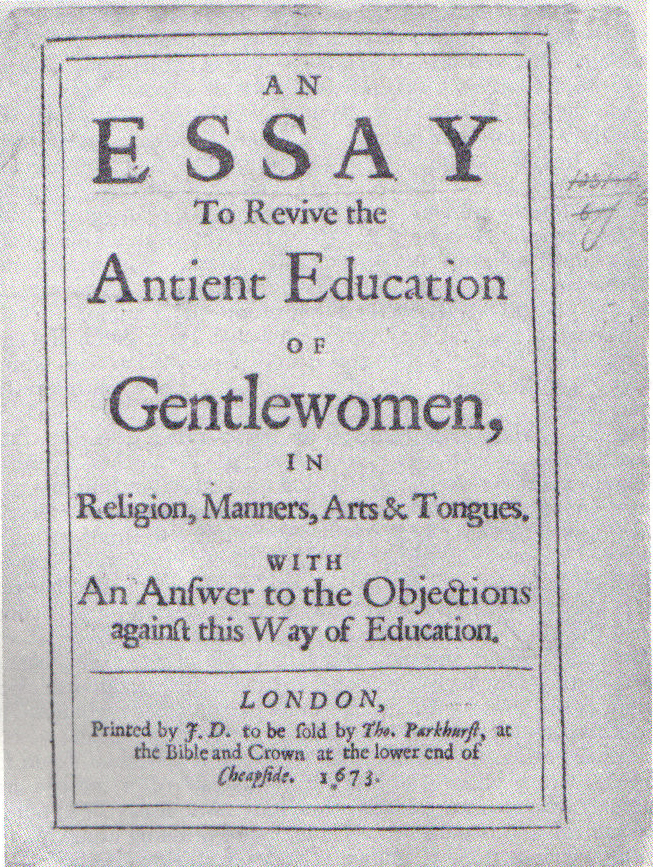
Title page of the British Library's copy of An Essay

The treatise is structured in three parts, beginning with a letter written in favour of educating women, followed by a letter arguing against the education of women, and a lengthy third part defending women's use of speech and resolving the debate in favour of educating women. The Essay was dedicated to "her Highness the Lady Mary, Eldest Daughter to his Royal Highness the Duke of York".

In part three of the Essay, the history of women's education is briefly outlined, and women who have achieved excellence are named, including Aspasia, Arete and Margaret Cavendish. Makin acknowledges that women have little financial or political power, thus she argues they need to derive power from persuasion. If women were the head of a household, as was frequent during the English Civil War, women needed to "understand, read, write, and speak their Mother Tongue". As such Makin adopted the views expressed by Ban Zhao long before her. Makin argues that because women don't usually speak in public they needed to be taught a rhetoric that would assist them in conversation with their husbands and in carrying out their domestic duties.

== Legacy ==
Makin has been described as a proto-feminist. However, like Christine de Pizan before her, Makin came from an intellectual family and advocated in favour of women's intellectual equality, not women's political equality. In An Essay Makin writes, "Let not your Ladiships be offended that I do not (as some have wittily done) plead for Female Preeminence. To ask too much is the way to be denied all". Arguments in favour of educating women have, however, legitimised the first feminists.

== Works ==
- An online version of Bathsua Makin's An Essay To Revive the Antient Education of Gentlewomen, in Religion, Manners, Arts & Tongues, With An Answer to the Objections against this Way of Education is available at A Celebration of Women Writers.
