= William James (MP, 1589) =

English politician

William James was an English politician. He sat as MP in 1589, though it is not known which constituency he sat for.

According to Simonds d'Ewes in 1682, he was appointed to the subsidy committee on 11 February 1589.
