= Antique furniture =

Collectible interior furnishing of considerable age

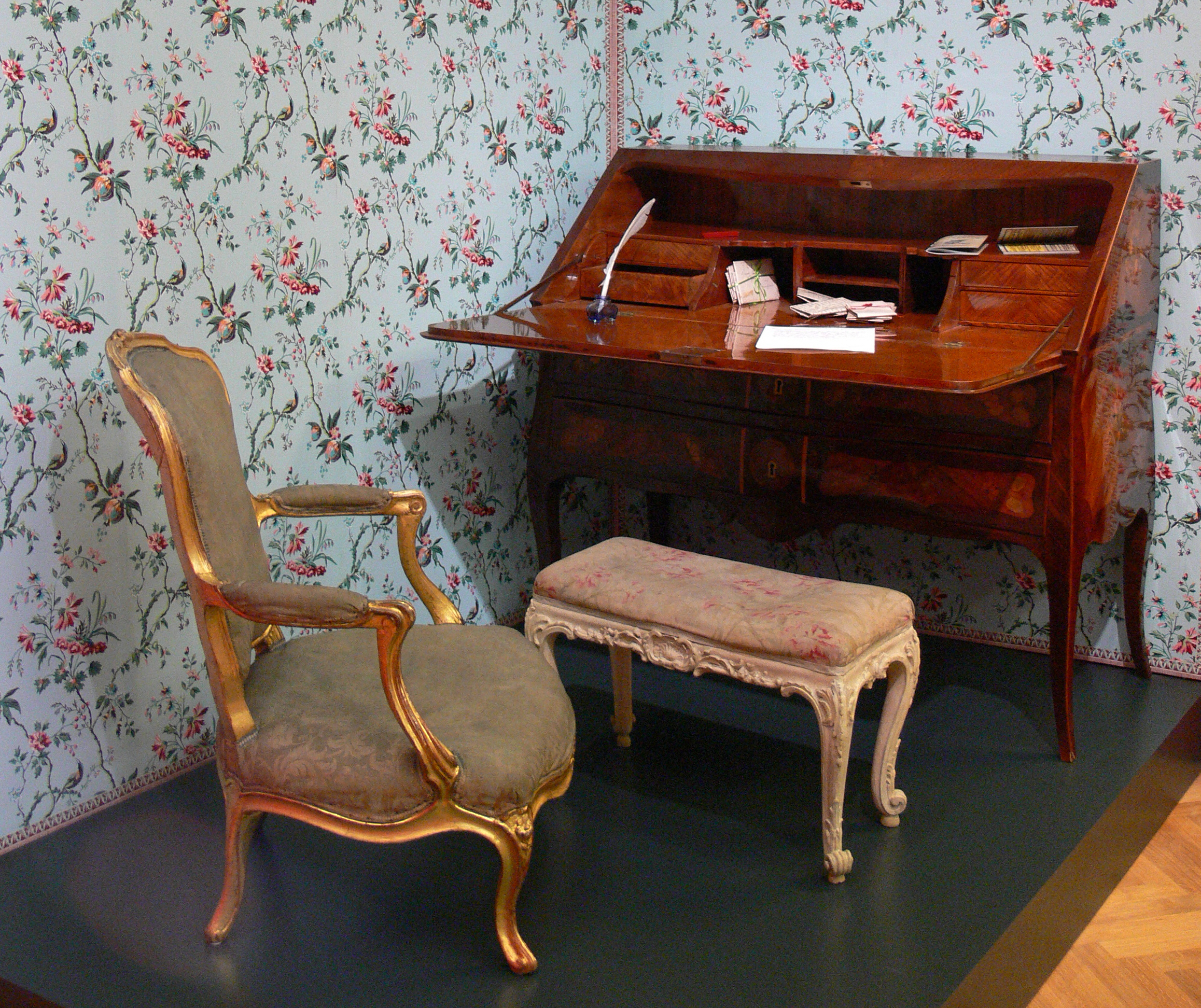
An antique chair and desk from the Reiss-Engelhorn Museum in Mannheim, Germany.

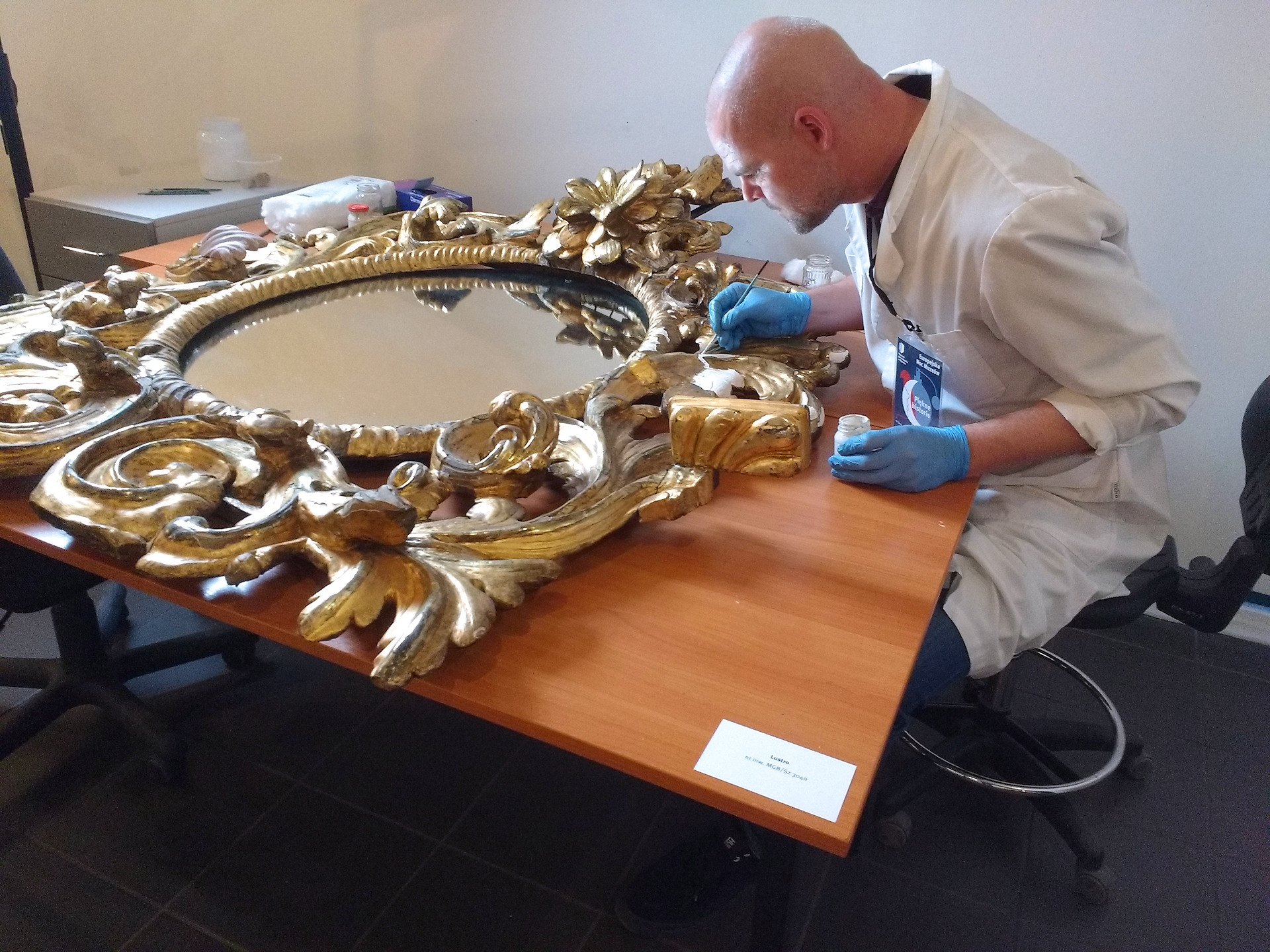
Restoring the frame of antique mirror

A piece of antique furniture is a collectible interior furnishing of considerable age. Often the age, rarity, condition, utility, or other unique features make a piece of furniture desirable as a collector's item, and thus termed an antique. The antique furniture pieces reflect the style and features of the time they were made; this can be called the antique's "period" (Edwardian, Tudor, Colonial, etc.). Christie's defines it as being over 100 years old.

Antique furniture may support the human body (such as seating or beds), provide storage, or hold objects on horizontal surfaces above the ground. Storage furniture (which often makes use of doors, drawers, and shelves) is used to hold or contain smaller objects such as clothes, tools, books, and household goods. Furniture can be a product of artistic design and is considered a form of decorative art. In addition to furniture's functional role, it can serve a symbolic or religious purpose. Domestic furniture works to create, in conjunction with furnishings such as clocks and lighting, comfortable and convenient interior spaces. Furniture can be made from many materials, including metal, plastic, and wood. Cabinetry and cabinet making are terms for the skill set used in the building of furniture.

The earliest furniture was simple and practical, but as furniture became crafted and decorated it became an early status symbol. Wealthy homeowners demanded that their furnishings reflect their status and lifestyles.

== See also ==
- List of furniture types
- Tallboy (furniture)
- Bergère
- Knoll sofa
- Watchman's chair
