= Raphael Thorius =

British physician, poet and humanist

Raphael Thorius M.D. (died 1625) was a London physician of Huguenot and Flemish background, known as a poet and humanist.

== Life ==
Thorius was the son of Franciscus Thorius (François De Thoor), M.D., a Paris physician who was Flemish: a Protestant convert, Latin poet and translator of Ronsard. He was born in Belle, Flanders, where his father had moved by 1570. His birthplace, now in France, was then part of the Southern Netherlands.

He studied medicine at Oxford, then graduated M.D. at the University of Leyden. He then began unlicensed practice in London, and was fined by the College of Physicians. Later he presented himself to the College for examination, and was admitted a licentiate on 23 December 1596. He resided in the parish of St. Benet Finck in London, and built up a good practice.

Thorius was one of the Dutch Reformed humanists of London, in the circle around Simon Ruytinck of the London Dutch church. There he knew Baldwin Hamey the elder, amongst others. He died of the plague in his own house in London in the summer of 1625. Lobelius the botanist, Nathaniel Baxter, Sir Robert Ayton, Meric Casaubon, Theodore Mayerne and William Halliday were among his other friends. He appears as the hard-drinking "Dr. Torie" in Pierre Gassendi's Life of Nicolas de Peiresc.

== Works ==
Thorius wrote a Latin ode in 1603, exhorting his wife and family to leave London on account of the plague. In 1610 he wrote Hymnus Tabaci, a poem of two books in hexameters. The influence of the Syphilis of Hieronymus Fracastorius has been suggested, a parallel being the way he addresses Sir William Paddy, as Fracastorius addresses Peter Bembo. Thorius revised the poem, and it was published in 1625 at Leyden (first London edition 1627, pocket edition wat Utrecht in 1644). In February 1625 Thorius completed a poem of 142 hexameter lines entitled Hyems, dedicated to Constantijn Huygens, which is sometimes printed with the Hymnus.

A manuscript volume of his poems (Sloane MS. 1768) contains Greek verses, and numerous Latin poems. Topics include: the execution of Sir Walter Ralegh; an epitaph for William Camden; an epistle to Baudius; and verses on the naturalists Rondeletius and Lobelius. The manuscript includes also the verse Thorius wrote with Jacob Cool, on behalf of the London Dutch community, for the 1604 coronation entry of James I of England.

== Family ==
Thorius had a son John, besides other children who died young.
