= Paul Bowes =

English lawyer (1627-1702)

Paul Bowes (bapt. Great Bromley, Essex, 24 Jan 1627; died 1702), was an English lawyer, known as the editor of the Journals of Simonds d'Ewes.

== Life ==
Bowes was the second son of Sir Thomas Bowes, knight, of Great Bromley, Essex, the witch-hunter, and Mary, third daughter of Paul D'Ewes, one of the six clerks in chancery and his first wife Cecelia Simonds. He was born at Great Bromley, and after being educated in the school at Moulton St Mary, Norfolk, was admitted a pensioner of St. John's College, Cambridge, 21 December 1650. He took no degree.

Having decided on the law for his future profession, Bowes on 12 May 1654 entered the Middle Temple. Called to the bar by there 10 May 1661, he became a bencher on 24 October 1679.

Bowes was elected a fellow of the Royal Society on 30 November 1699 (although, according to the Royal Society, that honour was reserved for his son Martin). Dying in June 1702, he was buried on 3 July at St. Dunstan's-in-the-West, Fleet Street.

== Works ==
Bowed edited the manuscript work of his celebrated uncle, Sir Simonds D'Ewes, entitled The Journals of all the Parliaments during the Reign of Queen Elizabeth, both of the House of Lords and House of Commons, folio, London, 1682. Other editions appeared in 1693 and 1708.

== Family ==
By his wife Bridget, daughter of Thomas Sturges of the Middle Temple, he left three sons and two daughters. His will, dated 5 Aug. 1699 (with two codicils dated 17 April and 12 Aug. 1701), was proved by his widow and sole executrix, on 16 July 1702. Besides property in Lincolnshire, Suffolk, and Essex, he was possessed, in 1700, of the manor of Rushton, Stokeford, and Binnegar in East Stoke, Dorsetshire.

Mrs. Bowes died in 1706. The eldest son, Martin, born in London, was also a pensioner of St. John's College, Cambridge, where he was admitted on 16 April 1686, at the age of sixteen, but left without taking a degree. He married Elizabeth, eldest daughter of Edward Thurland of Reigate, Surrey, and afterwards settled at Bury St. Edmund's, Suffolk, where he died in 1726. His second daughter, Ann, became, in 1732, the wife of Philip Broke of Nacton.
