= Sophia Stuart =

English princess (1606–1606)

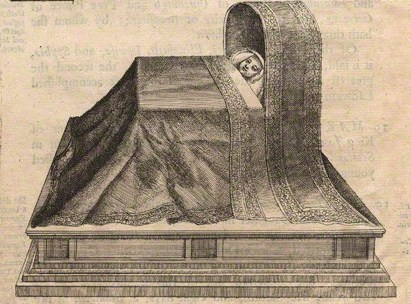
- Etching of her monument by Richard Gaywood
- Born: 22 June 1606; Greenwich Palace, London, England
- Died: 23 June 1606 (aged 2 days); Greenwich Palace, London, England
- Burial: 26 June 1606; Westminster Abbey, London
- House: Stuart
- Father: James VI and I
- Mother: Anne of Denmark

Sophia Stuart (22 June 1606 – 23 June 1606) was the fourth daughter and last of seven children of James VI and I and Anne of Denmark.

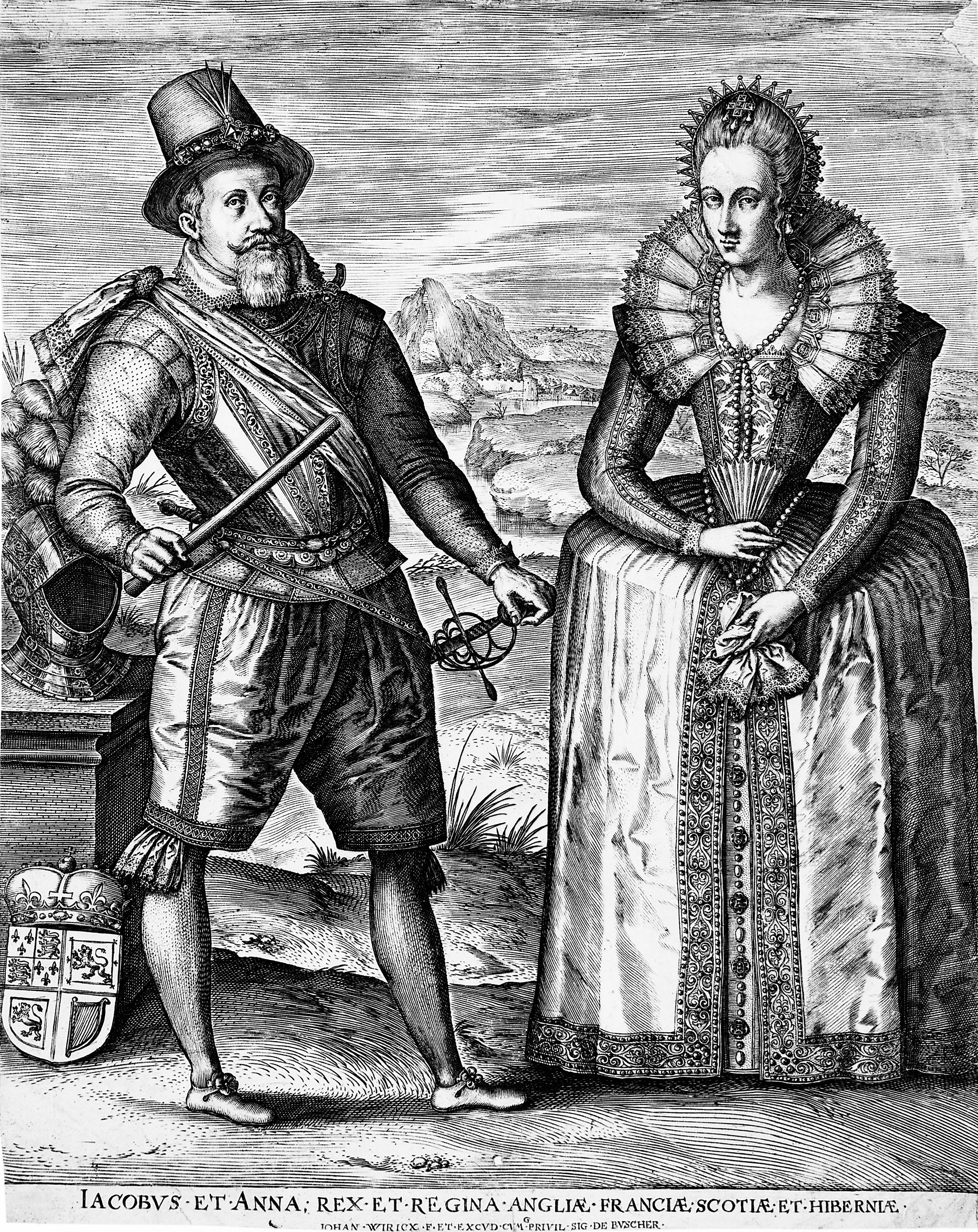
James VI and I and Anne of Denmark, Sophia’s parents

== Biography ==
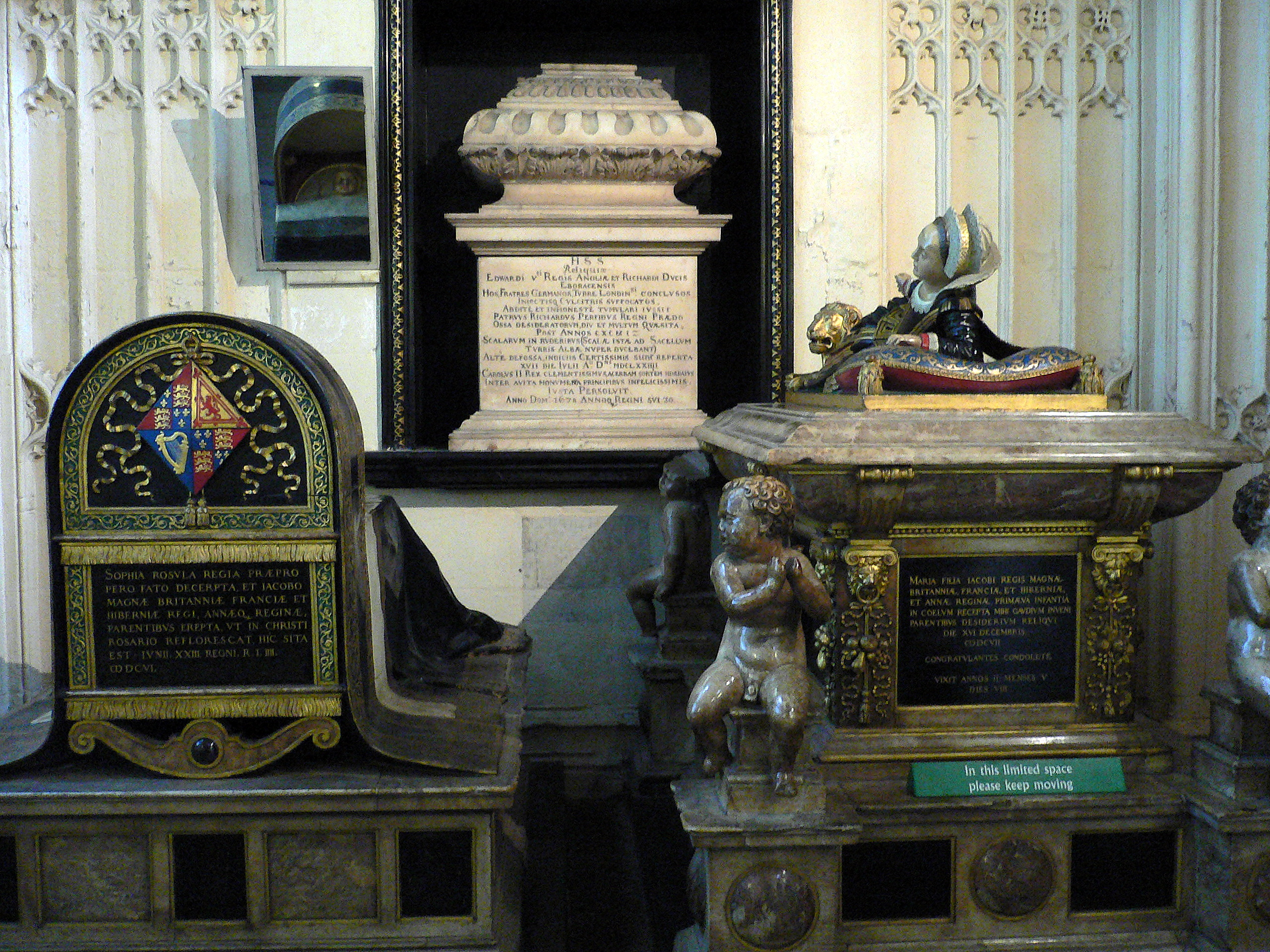
Sophia's tomb (left) at Westminster Abbey is shaped like a crib with an arched hood; her face is turned away from the viewer, but visible in the mirror hanging on the wall above her tomb.

Anne of Denmark was rumoured to be pregnant at the end of October 1605. Robert Naunton wrote that courtiers were uncertain because her figure was concealed by her farthingale. In May 1606 she stopped holding audiences with ambassadors including Zorzi Giustinian.

Anne of Denmark prepared herself for childbirth at the Palace of Placentia, or Greenwich Palace in May. Her lady in waiting, Audrey Walsingham, bought linen and lacework to the value of £614 for her lying-in. Anne's lodging was furnished with a cupboard displaying silver gilt plate, including a crystal jug with silver mounts that had been a New Year's Day gift to Elizabeth I in 1577.

Sophia Stuart was born early in the morning of Sunday 22 June 1606. Anne was attended by a midwife, Alice Dennis, and Peter Chamberlen, the surgeon to the queen, who had both helped at the birth of Mary Stuart in April 1605. Chamberlen is thought to have been the inventor of birthing forceps. Anne gave him a diamond ring for his efforts.

Sophia grew "verye weake" and was baptised by James Montague, Dean of the Chapel Royal. She was named after her maternal grandmother Sophie of Mecklenburg-Güstrow. Ninth and last child of James I of England and Queen Anne of Denmark, her body was carried on the Thames in a barge covered with black velvet to be buried in Westminster Abbey on 26 June.

== A cancelled tournament ==
There had been plans to hold a tournament at Greenwich to celebrate the birth and baptism. A challenge had been issued in the name of the "Four Knights Errant of the Fortunate Island" on 1 June 1606. The comic text of the challenge made King James laugh. A courtier, William Drummond of Hawthornden sent a copy of the text to a friend in Scotland. Sophia's uncle Christian IV of Denmark was expected to attend. The event was cancelled.

Christian IV arrived in England and went to see his grieving sister at Greenwich on 18 July. Christian IV was entertained by the king at Theobalds while Anne remained at Greenwich, still in the apartments set aside for her confinement. Anne was "churched" in a private ceremony at Greenwich by Dr Montague on 3 August. Before leaving England, Christian IV competed with King James at running at the ring.

== Monument at Westminster Abbey ==
Sophia's monument at Westminster Abbey resembling a stone crib was designed by Maximilian Colt and painted and gilded by John de Critz. The tomb is finely carved with lacework and an embroidered velvet cover. Its Latin inscription may be translated, "Sophia, a royal rosebud untimely plucked by Fate and from James, King of Great Britain, France and Ireland, and Queen Anne her parents, snatched away, to flower again in the rose garden of Christ, lies here. 23rd June, 4th year of the reign of King James 1606".

== Bibliography ==
- Panton, James (24 February 2011). Historical Dictionary of the British Monarchy. Scarecrow Press. p. 465. ISBN 978-0-8108-7497-8.
