= Oliver Browne =

Oliver Browne (died c.1651) was an English upholsterer and furniture maker from London in the 17th century who worked for aristocrats and the royal court. His business partners included John Baker, another upholsterer or "upholder", who worked for the royal family. Baker was "upholster" to James VI and I and Prince Henry, and had supplied items for the coronation of James I and Anne. Baker's son, also John Baker, continued the business after the Restoration.

== Fashionable commissions ==
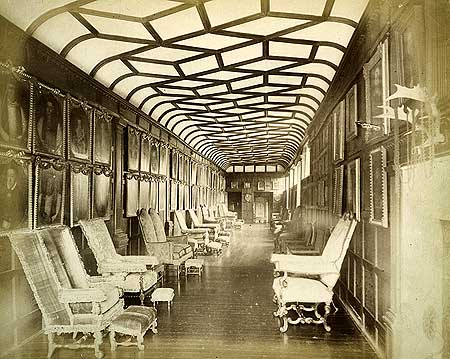
17th-century furniture, possibly supplied by Browne & Baker, or of later date, displayed in the Brown Gallery at Knole in 1889

Browne worked for Lionel Cranfield, 1st Earl of Middlesex, who was Keeper of the Wardrobe. He employed them to supply banners, cushions, and chairs to Westminster Abbey for the funeral of Anne of Denmark, and to furnish a lodging and chapel for the Spanish ambassador Diego Sarmiento de Acuña, Count of Gondomar at Ely House in March 1620.

A number of Browne's bills for Cranfield's own houses survive at the Kent History and Library Centre, Maidstone. Cranfield's homes included Chelsea House, which he bought in 1619 and improved employing the services of Inigo Jones and Nicholas Stone, and Copthall in Essex. His furnishings were supplied by Oliver Browne and John Baker, who had "dressed" Anne of Denmark's cabinet room in 1605, and painted and gilded by Thomas Capp. These included a suite of furnishings for Cranfield's second wife Anne Brett's "lying-in" at Chelsea in 1621 with a cradle with a canopy of crimson damask for James Cranfield in 1621. Furniture from Copthall was taken to Knole in 1701.

A bed surviving at Knole (National Trust) is thought to have been one of Cranfield's commissions from Baker and Browne. The silk hangings are decorated with "spangles" or "oes", early modern sequins, and the piece has long been known as the "Spangled Bed". The collection also includes an influential early sofa or couch design, known as the "Knole Settee".

King James became increasingly infirm, but continued to ride and hunt. In December 1624, Oliver Browne provided six portable velvet chairs to use at the hunt, and six special Spanish leather chairs to lift him to and from his bed. Browne and Baker provided textiles for the hearse or catafalque designed by Inigo Jones in Westminster Abbey for the king's funeral.

In 1644, Oliver Browne was upholsterer to the Houses of Parliament. He was still working with John Baker, and they petitioned for payment for the hire of tapestry from Oatlands Palace used to hang rooms near the Parliament Chamber. Browne and Baker were paid £180 for the hire of these four suites of hangings and other services to the "House of Peers" in 1646.
