= Maximilian Colt =

Flemish sculptor

Maximilian Colt alias Maximilian Poultrain (died after 1641) was a Flemish sculptor who settled in England and eventually rose to become the King's Master Carver.

== Life ==
Colt was a Calvinist, born in Arras apparently as Maximilian Poultrain, who settled in England in the closing years of the reign of Queen Elizabeth I. He lived in London, in Bartholomew Close (Smithfield). When King James I came to the English Throne, Colt was commissioned to produce an extravagant monument to the memory of Queen Elizabeth. This was followed by smaller monuments to James' infant daughters, the Princesses Mary and Sophia. All three can be seen in Westminster Abbey.

In January 1607 he was naturalized as a denizen of England. On 28 July 1608, he was appointed the King's Master Carver. He was employed decorating several Royal barges in 1621. The carvings were painted by John de Critz and detailed in his bill.

Colt made an effigy for the funeral of Anne of Denmark in 1619. He provided two wooden effigies of King James in 1625 for use in his funeral ceremonies at Denmark House and Westminster Abbey, the latter with articulated limbs, which would be dressed with the king's clothes and posed in a catafalque designed by Inigo Jones. Colt based the faces on a death mask made at Theobalds.

Colt also produced fine sepulchral monuments for many of the English nobility and gentry, for example Robert Cecil, Earl of Salisbury at Bishop's Hatfield in Hertfordshire, whose adjoining house he also decorated, and the Countess of Derby at Harefield in Middlesex. For Scottish patrons, he designed the tomb of Viscount Stormont at Scone Palace and George Home at Dunbar.

Colt was briefly imprisoned in the Fleet Prison, late in his life.

He was not the architect of Wadham College, Oxford, as is sometimes stated, this was Sir Thomas Holt of York.

== Family ==
By his wife, Susan, Maximilian had at least two sons, John (also a sculptor) and Alexander, and a daughter who died young.
