= Adam Littleton =

English cleric and lexicographer

Adam Littleton (1627–1694) was an English cleric and lexicographer.

== Life ==
Born on 2 November 1627, he was the son of Thomas Littleton, vicar of Halesowen, Worcestershire. He was educated on the foundation at Westminster School, end was elected to Christ Church, Oxford, in 1644. He was a conspicuous opponent of the parliamentary visitation of the University of Oxford, and was expelled from the university on 2 November 1648. He apparently was allowed to return, and joined in May 1651 with three other students in a petition for the restitution of their scholarships.

Littleton became an usher at Westminster School, taught in other places, and then succeeded to the post of second master at Westminster in 1658. After the Restoration of 1660 he established a school at Chelsea, London. On 3 February 1669 he was admitted rector of Chelsea (which he held until his death), and accumulated the degrees in divinity on 12 July 1670. During the same year Charles II made him a royal chaplain, and gave him a grant of the reversion of the head-mastership of Westminster School on the death of Richard Busby. In September 1674 he became prebendary of Westminster Abbey, in 1683 rector of Overton, Hampshire and in 1685 he was licensed to the church of St. Botolph, Aldersgate, where he served for about four years. He was also chaplain to Prince Rupert of the Rhine.

Littleton died on 30 June 1694, and was buried in Chelsea Church where there was a monument to his memory.

== Works ==
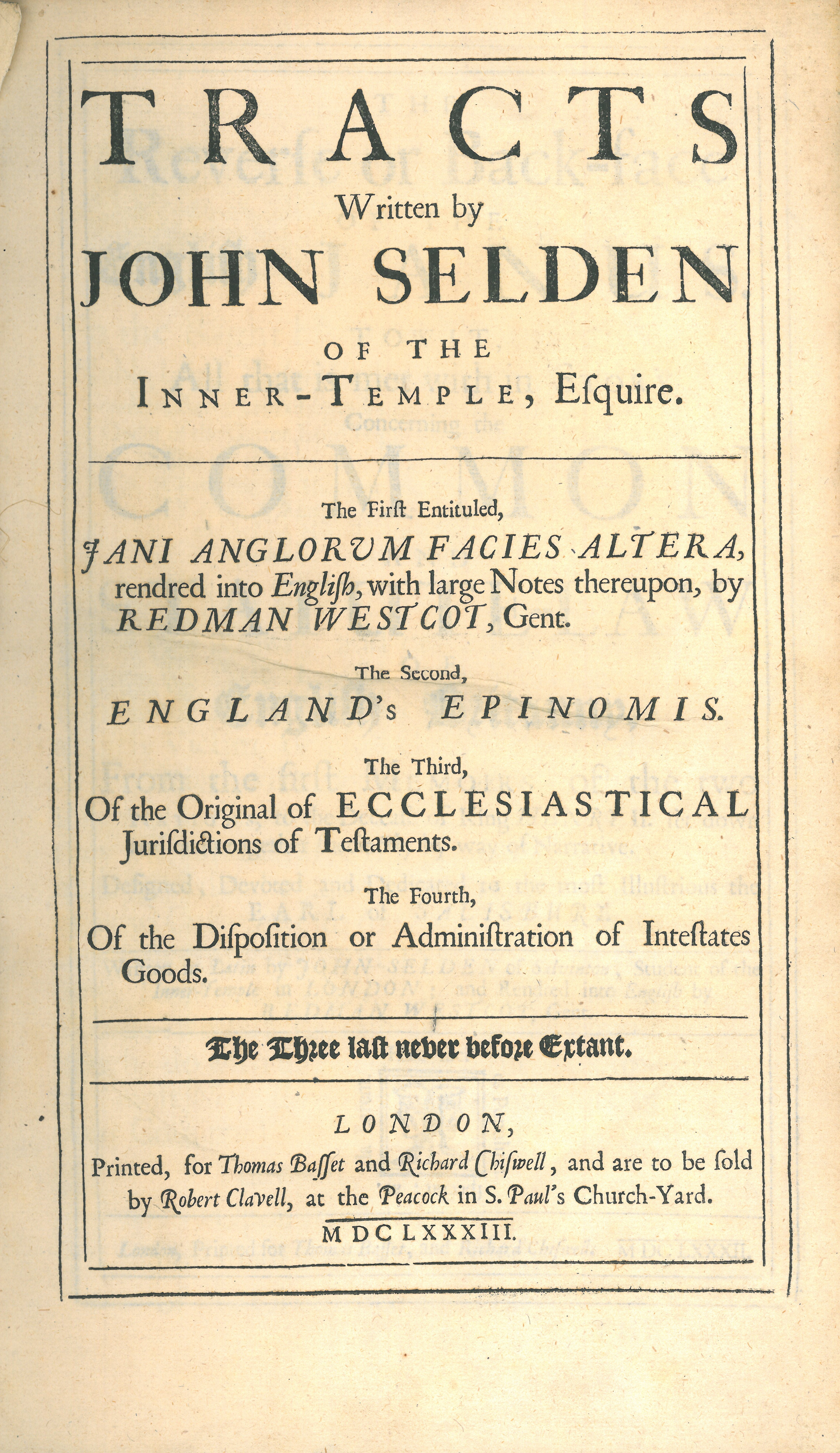
Tracts Written by John Selden of the Inner-Temple, which was published in 1683, contained an English translation of Selden's Jani Anglorum Facies Altera (1610) by Littleton under the pseudonym Redman Westcot

A Latin poem Tragi-Comœdia Oxoniensis, ridiculing the parliamentary visitation of Oxford, has been ascribed both Littleton, and to John Carrick, also of Christ Church.

Littleton's major work, Linguæ Latinæ liber dictionarius quadripartitus (A Latine Dictionary, in four parts), was published at London in 1678; further editions appeared in 1684, 1693, 1703, 1715, 1723, and a seventh edition in 1735, months before the issue of Robert Ainsworth's Dictionary which took its place. Littleton also worked on a Greek lexicon, but died before its completion.

He published also:

- Pasor metricus sive Voces omnes Novi Testamenti primogeniæ … Hexametris Versibus comprehensæ. Accessit diatriba in VIII Tractatus distributa; in quâ agitur de flectendi, derivandi, & componendi ratione ... Margaritæ Christianæ, sive Novi Testamenti adagiales formulæ, colligente A. Schotto huc congestæ ut juventuti materiam ad Praxin subministrent, 3 pts. London, 1658.
- Elementa Religionis, sive quatuor Capita Catechetica, London, 1658.
- Solomon's Gate: or, an Entrance into the Church, being a familiar explanation of the Grounds of Religion conteined in the four heads of Catechism, London, 1662.
- Sixty-one Sermons preached mostly upon publick occasions, 3 pts., London, 1680, 1679.

Littleton published sermons, and prefixed Latin elegiacs to Nathaniel Hodges's Λοιμολογία, 1672. He wrote the preface to Cicero, edited by Thomas Gale, 2 vols., 1681. The life of Themistocles in vol. i. of the English translation of Plutarch's Lives of 1683, was by Littleton. In the same year, under the name of Redman Westcot, he published an English translation, with notes, of John Selden's Jani Anglorum Facies Altera (1610). In gratitude for the benefactions to the church at Chelsea of his friend Baldwin Hamey the younger, Littleton appended to his Latin Dictionary verses in praise of Hamey. After Hamey's death, he edited his essay On the Oath of Hippocrates (1693).

== Family ==
Littleton was married three times. He married secondly, by licence dated 24 January 1667, Susan Rich of West Ham, Essex. By his third marriage, with the daughter of Richard Guildford of Chelsea, he acquired a fortune. Spending freely as a collector, he left his widow, who was buried at Chelsea on 14 November 1698, in poor circumstances, and his books were sold in 1695.

== Notes ==
Attribution

This article incorporates text from a publication now in the public domain: Lee, Sidney, ed. (1893). "Littleton, Adam". Dictionary of National Biography. Vol. 33. London: Smith, Elder & Co.
