= Baldwin Hamey the Younger =

English physician

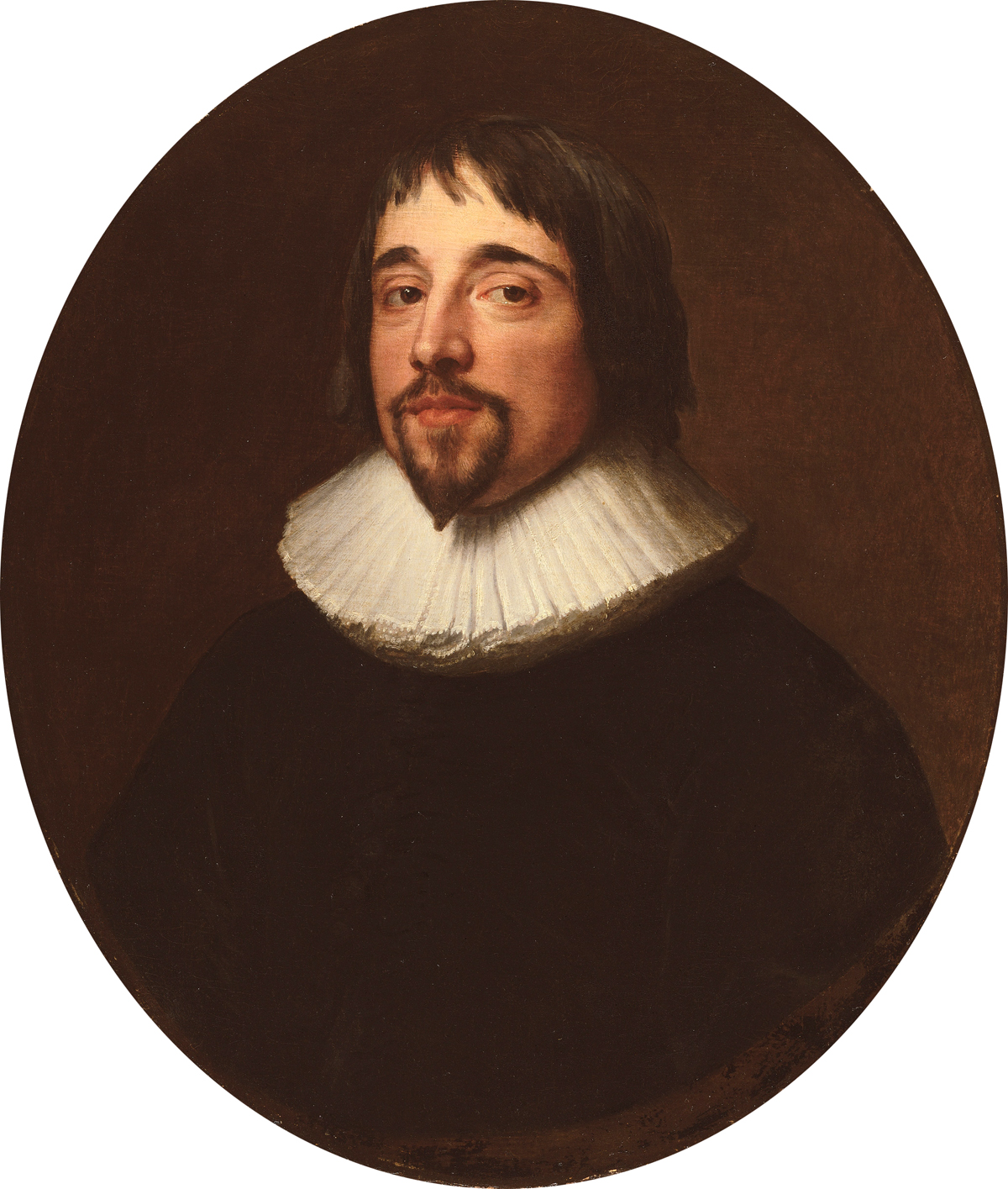
Baldwin Hamey, portrait by Anthony van Dyck, about 1638

Baldwin Hamey the Younger M.D., FRCP (1600–1676) was an English physician, now best known as a medical biographer.

== Life ==
The eldest son of Baldwin Hamey the Elder, he was born in London 24 April 1600 of Flemish and Dutch parents. He entered the University of Leyden as a student of philosophy in May 1617. He visited Oxford for a time in 1621, and studied in the library there. In August 1625 he went to Hastings to sail to the Netherlands, was detained by the mayor, and avoided shipwreck. He graduated M.D. at Leyden 12 August 1626.

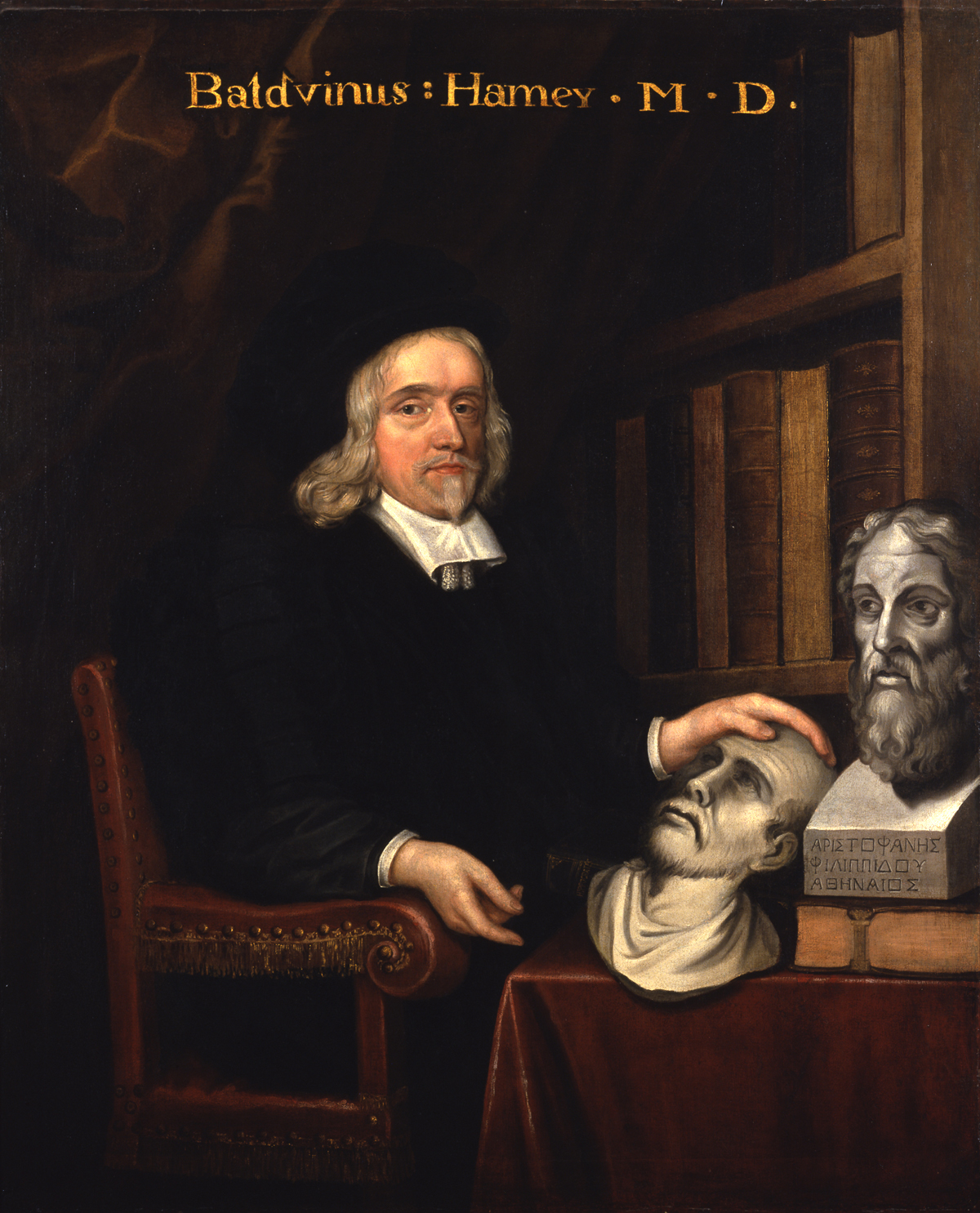
Baldwin Hamey, 1674 portrait by Matthew Snelling

Hamey then toured Europe, and was incorporated M.D. at Oxford 4 February 1629. He was admitted a Fellow of the College of Physicians of London on 10 January 1633, was eight times censor, from 1640 to 1654, was registrar in 1646 and 1650 to 1654, and treasurer 1664–6. In 1647 he delivered the Gulstonian lectures. He settled in practice in the parish of St. Clement's, Eastcheap. John Pearson's sermons on the Creed were preached in the parish church, and he became one of Hamey's friends.

Hamey remained in London during the First English Civil War, despite Royalist sympathies. He attended nonconformist sermons for the sake of appearances. At the Restoration in 1660 he declined a knighthood. He retired from practice in 1665, and went to live at Chelsea where he died, 14 May 1676. He was buried in the parish church, beneath a black marble slab bearing his name, the date of his death, and the sentence: "When the breath goeth out of a man he returneth unto his earth".

== Legacy ==
Hamey was wealthy by inheritance and his own practice. He supported the Oxford education of John Sigismund Clewer, son of Philipp Clüver. He gave money to churches, and became a major benefactor of the College of Physicians. His gift in 1672 to the College of an estate near Great Ongar in Essex indirectly supported the physicians of St. Bartholomew's Hospital.

== Works ==
Hamey's doctoral thesis De Angina was published. Several of his manuscripts were left to the College of Physicians:

- Bustorum aliquot Reliquiæ ab anno 1628, qui mihi primus fuit conducti seorsim a parentibus non inauspicato hospitii. It begins with an account of Theodore Goulston, and then gives histories of fifty-three other physicians, contemporaries of Hamey.
- Universa Medicina, a folio book of notes on medicine.
- Gulstonian Lectures.
- Notes on Aristophanes.

Adam Littleton edited in 1693 Hamey's work on the Hippocratic oath, Dissertatio epistolaris de juramento medicorum qui ὅρκος Ἱππoκράτους dicitur.

== Family ==
Hamey married Ann Petin of Rotterdam. They had no children.
