= The Fore-Runner of Revenge =

Pamphlet by George Eglisham

The Fore-runner of Revenge
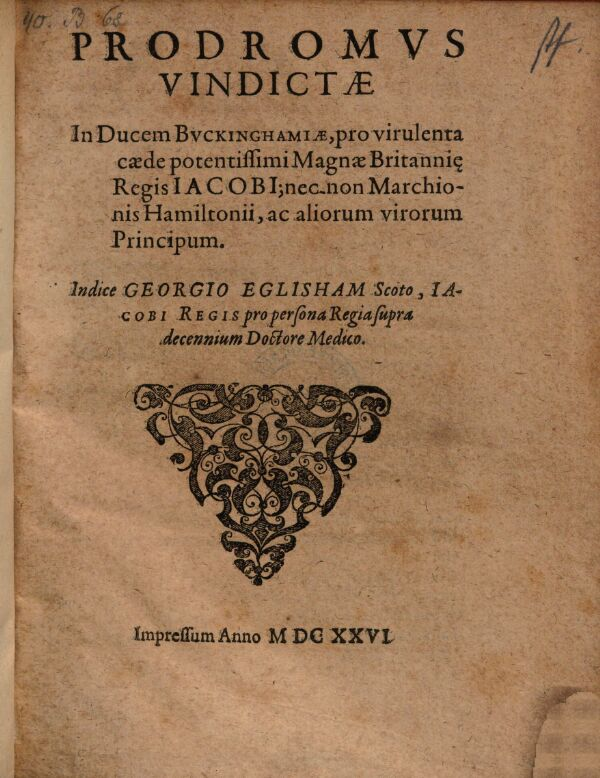
- Title page of Prodromus Vindictae (1626)
- Author: George Eglisham
- Original title: The Forerunner of Revenge upon the Duke of Buckingham for the poysoning of the most potent King James
- Language: English, Latin, German
- Subject: James I of England
- Published: Frankfurt (false address; really Brussels)
- Publisher: anonymous (later confirmed as Jan van Meerbeeck)
- Publication date: 1626
- English publication date: 1626
- Media type: quarto

The Forerunner of Revenge, also published in Latin and in German as Prodromus Vindictæ, was a pamphlet accusing George Villiers, 1st Duke of Buckingham of having caused the death of King James I of England by poison. It was written by George Eglisham, who had attended upon King James as a physician, and was first published anonymously with a Frankfurt address. It was in fact printed in Brussels by Jan van Meerbeeck. It contributed to the aura of suspicion that led to the Duke of Buckingham's murder, and was reprinted in 1642 to bring Charles I of England into discredit.
