= Baldwin Hamey the Elder =

Flemish physician

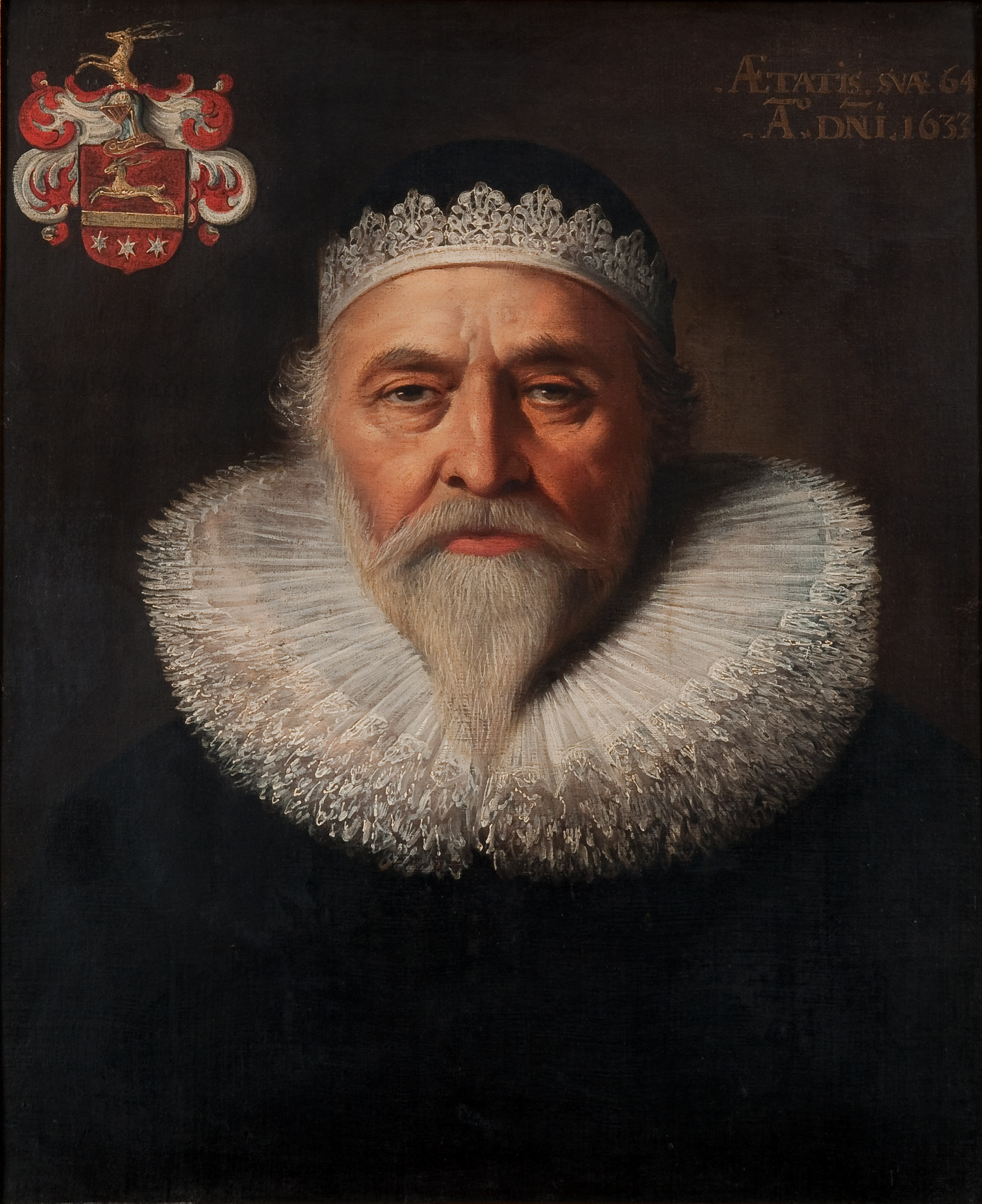
- Born: 1568
- Died: 1640 (aged 71–72)
- Occupation: Medical doctor

Baldwin Hamey the Elder, M.D., LRCP, also Baudouin Hamey (1568–1640) was a Flemish physician who settled in London.

== Life ==
Hamey was born at Bruges, and studied at the University of Leyden, where he graduated M.D. in 1592. He was nominated by Johannes Heurnius for a post under Feodor II of Russia, who had asked the Rector of Leiden for a physician. He held the position from 1594 to 1597, when he resigned. Mark Ridley was another physician in Moscow at the same time: it is thought they both made the mistake of coming without ensuring a legal right to leave.

In 1598 Hamey returned to Holland, and in the same year settled in London. There he had a marginal and unlicensed practice, largely among immigrants, for a dozen years. He was admitted a licentiate of the College of Physicians on 12 January 1610. He then practised with success till his death, of a pestilential fever, 10 November 1640. He was buried on the north side of the church of All Hallows Barking, and his three children erected a monument in the church to his memory. He left money to the College of Physicians.

Hamey was a member of the Dutch Reformed humanist circle around the London church of Simon Ruytinck. He associated in it with Jacob Cool (Ortelianus) and Raphael Thorius. As a physician he was a conservative Galenist. A laudatory biography was written by Richard Palmer.

== Family ==
Hamey in 1598 married Sara Oeils, in Amsterdam. His niece, Mary Oeils, married George Johnson MP. His eldest son, Baldwin Hamey the younger also became a physician. His second son was a merchant in London, and his daughter married a Mr. Palmer.

== Notes ==
Attribution

This article incorporates text from a publication now in the public domain: Stephen, Leslie; Lee, Sidney, eds. (1890). "Hamey, Baldwin (1568-1640)". Dictionary of National Biography. Vol. 24. London: Smith, Elder & Co.
