= Knole settee =

Preserved sofa in Kent, England

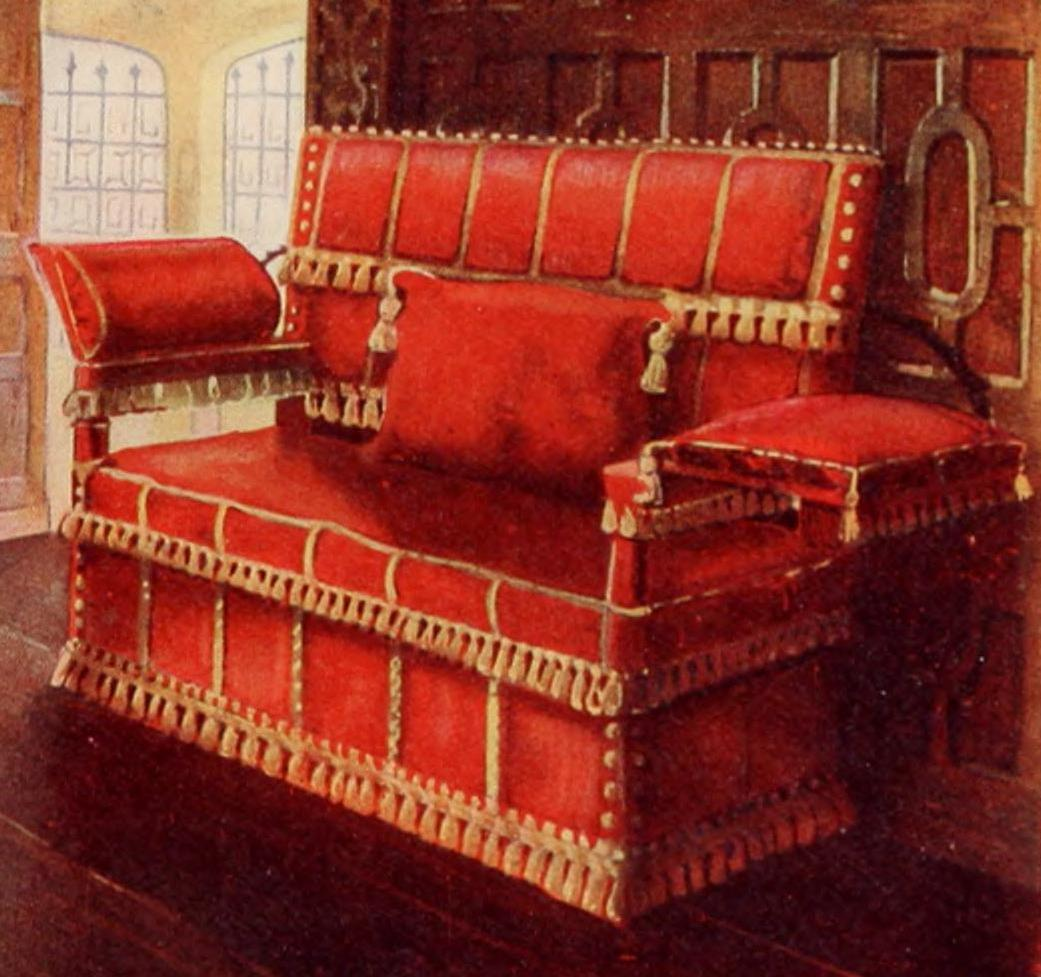
Flap-down arms, when vertical, are nearly as tall as the back. 1910 reconstruction

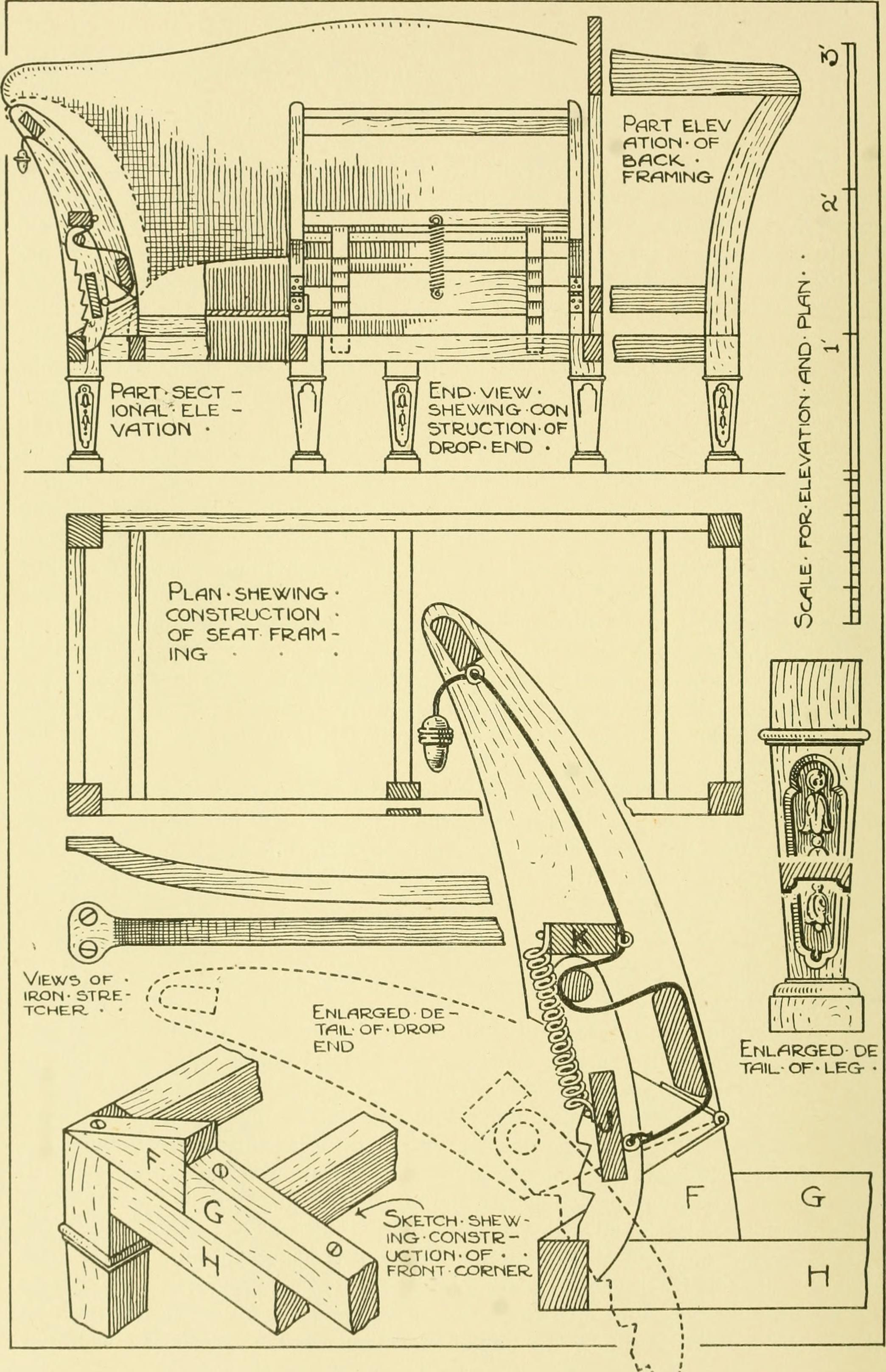
Some "mechanical features of Chesterfield and Knole settees", 1922 cabinetmakers' manual

The original Knole settee (also known as the Knole sofa) is a couch chair made in the 17th century, probably around 1640. It is housed at Knole in Kent, a house owned by the Sackville-West family since 1605 but now in the care of the National Trust.

It was originally used not as a comfortable sofa but as a formal throne-like seat on which an aristocrat or monarch would have sat to receive visitors. It was wide enough that a monarch and consort could be seated side by side. As of 2021, it is kept at Knole House in a transparent case.

Modern versions of the design are marketed as "Knole settees" or "Knole sofas". They feature adjustable side arms and considerable depth of seating and usually have exposed wooden finials atop the rear corners, and some exposed wood may be present on the arms. The arms, more correctly sides, are the same height as the back. The side arms are tied to the sofa back using a heavy decorative braid, often with an elaborate tassel, looped around the finials on the arms and back.

== Etymology and history ==
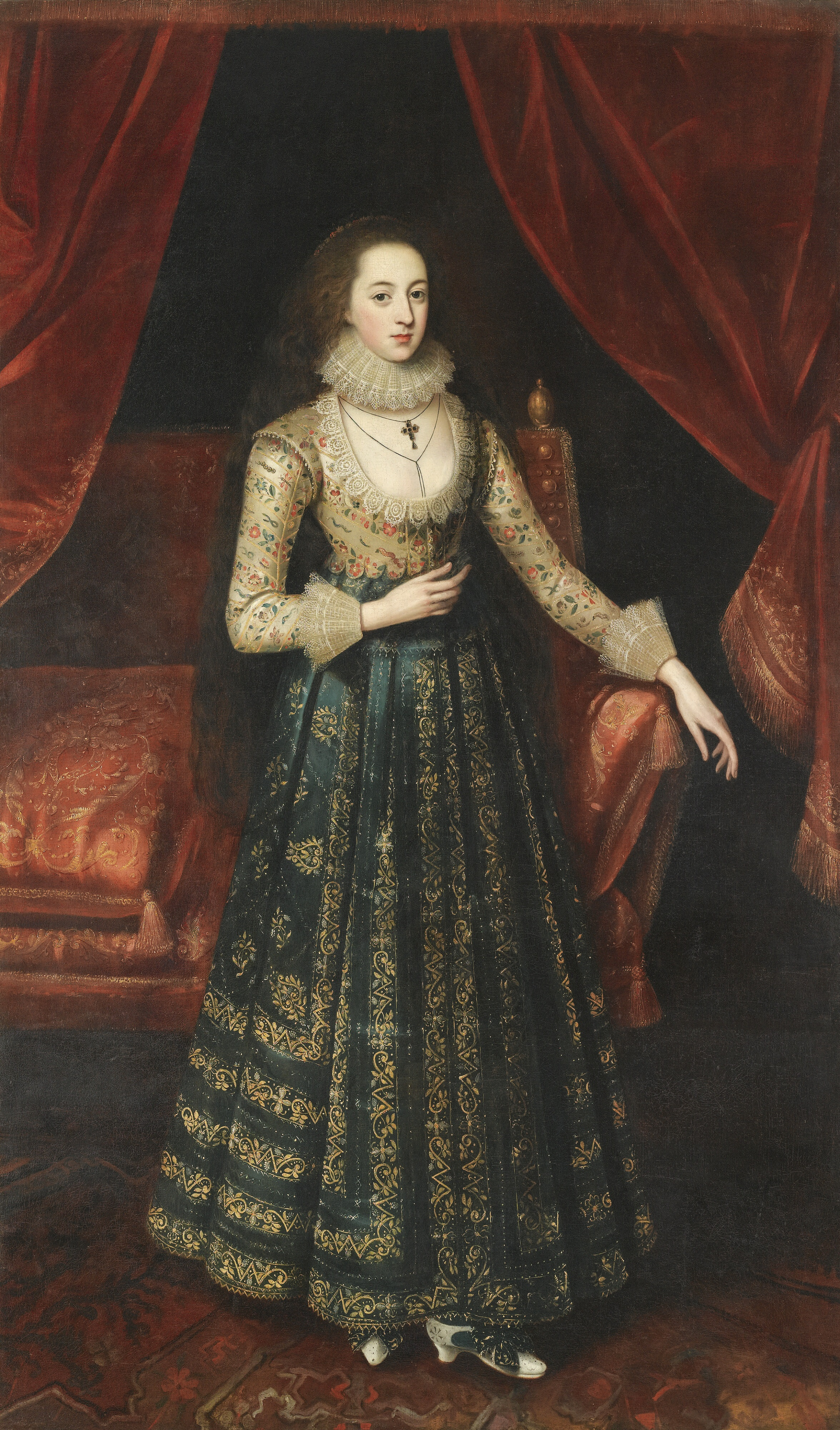
Portrait of a lady circa 1619, with sofa and canopy, Dunham Massey, National Trust

The name of the sofa is spelled as "Knole" and not "Knoll", and it has no relation to the Knoll furniture company. The sofa's name derives from Knole House in Sevenoaks, Kent, which is open to the public and run by the National Trust. On display there is the original Knole sofa, along with other pieces of matching seat furniture.

The exact date of the making of the "Knole sofa" and its original patron is unclear. The sofa or couch may have been made for the royal family and brought to Knole sometime in the 17th or 18th century. It was probably originally described as a couch or couch chair. A London furniture maker and upholsterer, Ralph Grynder, made couches for Henrietta Maria in the 1630s, and these were supplied with suites of matching chairs and stools with a canopy suspended above. The inventories of English aristocrats also include similar suites. A portrait of Vere Egerton, Mrs William Booth, painted around 1619 at Dunham Massey, shows a red couch with a curtained canopy.

Some records show that couches or couch beds were brought to Knole from the London residence of the family, Dorset House, in 1624. These included a "cooch of velvet laced with Crimsin silk & gold Lace, six longe cushions suitable to it, four chairs suitable to it". It is unclear if this describes the surviving sofa or if the Knole sofa is more like those made later by Ralph Grynder in the 1630s and 1640s. The exposed beech woodwork of the Knole sofa has traces of original marbling and painted and gilded arabesque decoration. Thomas Capp was a specialist in painting furniture in this period who worked for Lionel Cranfield, 1st Earl of Middlesex, briefly a keeper of the Royal Wardrobe.

== In literature ==
Some pieces of literature refer to the Knole sofa. For example, Derek Marlowe notes the usage in his 1968 book Memoirs of a Venus Lackey. In the 1962 novel In High Places, a Knole sofa is positioned in a room with a fine antique Kerman carpet.
