= Simonds d'Ewes =

English politician

Sir Simonds d'Ewes, 1st Baronet (18 December 1602 – 18 April 1650) was an English antiquary and politician. He was bred for the bar, was a member of the Long Parliament and left notes on its transactions. D'Ewes took the Puritan side in the Civil War. His Journal of all the Parliaments of Elizabeth is of value; he left an Autobiography and Correspondence.

== Early life ==
Simonds d'Ewes was born on 18 December 1602 at Coaxdon Hall, Dorset (now in All Saints, Devon), the eldest son of Paul d'Ewes, of Milden, Suffolk, one of the Six Clerks in Chancery, and his first wife Cecelia, daughter and heiress of Sir Richard Simonds of Coaxden. His father's family came originally from Gelderland: Simonds' great-grandfather emigrated to England about 1510. He inherited a fortune from his maternal grandfather while still young; his other grandfather, Gerard d'Ewes, of Gaynes, Upminster, Essex, who married Grace Hynde, was a printer.

After his mother's death in 1618, his father remarried the widowed Elizabeth Isham, Lady Denton, who was only a few years older than her stepson: Simonds approved of the marriage and may have played a part in arranging it. His relations with his father, a difficult and quarrelsome man, were never good. After some early private teaching, including time at the school of Henry Reynolds (father of Bathsua Makin, who impressed d'Ewes much more), he was sent to the grammar school at Bury St Edmunds. At Bury St Edmunds, he wrote 2,850 verses of poetry in Greek and Latin.

D'Ewes then went to St John's College, Cambridge, and studied under Richard Holdsworth. At St John's, he was exposed to and influenced by a strong college tradition of Puritanism.

He was admitted to the Middle Temple in 1611, and in 1623 was called to the Bar. Being independently wealthy, he did not pursue a legal career, preferring instead to follow up antiquarian interests, which took him to the records in the Tower of London. He met Sir Robert Cotton, who introduced him to John Selden, the outstanding lawyer-scholar of the time; but D'Ewes found him conceited.

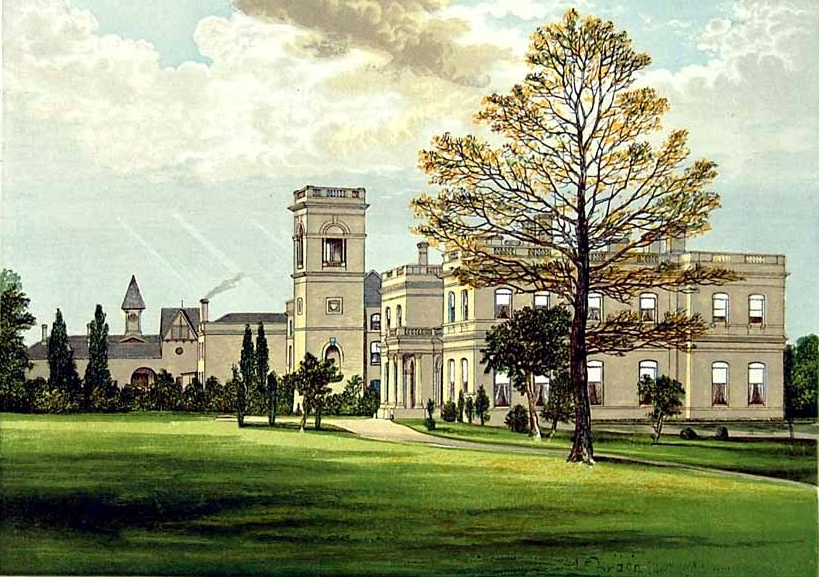
Stowlangtoft Hall near Bury St Edmunds, which Simonds inherited from his father

In 1626, he married Anne Clopton, daughter and heiress of Sir William Clopton, of Luton's Hall (also known as Kentwell Hall) near Long Melford, Suffolk. The marriage brought him a considerable addition to his wealth, but was evidently a love match, judging by his letters to Anne, who was just fourteen. They had one son, who died an infant in 1636, and one daughter Cicely, who married Sir Thomas D'Arcy, 1st Baronet. He was knighted by Charles I on 6 December 1626.

He took a house at Islington, where he pursued his studies. In 1632 he retired to Bury St. Edmunds, in belated obedience to the King's proclamation to the gentry to quit London and live at home. His father, who died in 1631, had purchased Stowlangtoft Hall nearby, and Simonds took up residence there in 1633.

== Political career ==
In 1639, d'Ewes was High Sheriff of Suffolk, and in 1640, he was elected as member for Sudbury, sitting in the Long Parliament. Although he opposed the King's arbitrary rule, his views were moderate; he was given a baronetcy by the king in 1641, possibly as an attempt to buy allegiance, in July. Since his beloved younger brother was an officer in the King's army, this is plausible. But it cannot be confirmed because the King's desperate need for money had led to a resumption of the sale of honours such as baronetcies at this time. Simonds' pleasure in the honour was destroyed almost at once by the death of his beloved first wife Anne.

On the outbreak of the First English Civil War in 1642, d'Ewes joined the Parliamentarians. He remained in Parliament until 1648, when he was expelled in Pride's Purge. After 1648, d'Ewes took no further part in politics, and devoted himself to literary studies. He died on 18 April 1650, having married again, to Elizabeth Willoughby, daughter of Sir Henry Willoughby, 1st Baronet of Risley, Derbyshire and his first wife Elizabeth Knollys, daughter of Sir Henry Knollys. By Elizabeth, he had his second and only surviving son and heir, Willoughby, who succeeded as second baronet.

== Antiquarian ==
Simonds d'Ewes is perhaps best known for his work as an antiquarian, and particularly for his transcriptions of important historical documents, originals of which do not survive today, and the Journals of all the Parliaments during the Reign of Queen Elizabeth. Although d'Ewes was ambitious in this field, he lacked the ability to generalise or construct effectively, and died without publishing any major work, except The Primitive Practice for Preserving Truth (1645) and a few speeches. The Journals were published posthumously in 1682 by his nephew, the lawyer and antiquary Paul Bowes.

The Library of Sir Simonds d’Ewes is a detailed examination that reflects on the early history of books in England as manifested in d'Ewes' collection.

== Legacy ==
Simonds d'Ewes, although known for the events in parliament during the 1640s, is best known for his contribution to the antiquarian world. His chief scholarly legacy is the collection of his transcriptions of primary documents that are now lost. He also kept a diary, which gives an insight into the events in Parliament, as well as glimpses of his own character.

Although he supported Parliament against the King during the Civil War, he was frequently shocked by the unruly and aggressive behaviour of his fellow Parliamentarians. Of the events leading to the abrupt dissolution of Parliament in March 1629, he wrote that "diverse fiery spirits in the House of Commons were very faulty and cannot be excused".

== See also ==
- Long Parliament
- Thomas Pride
- Pride's Purge
- Puritan

== Bibliography ==
- Blatchly, J. M. (2008) [2004]. "D'Ewes, Sir Simonds, first baronet (1602–1650)". Oxford Dictionary of National Biography (online ed.). Oxford University Press. doi:10.1093/ref:odnb/7577. (Subscription, Wikipedia Library access or UK public library membership required.)
- Bremmer, Rolf H. Jr (2008). "'Mine is bigger than yours': the Anglo-Saxon collections of Johannes de Laet (1581–1649) and Sir Symonds D'Ewes (1602–1650)". In Hall, Thomas N.; Scragg, Donald (eds.). Anglo-Saxon Books and their Readers. Kalamazoo, MI: Medieval Institute Publications. pp. 136–174. ISBN 9781580441377.
- Bruce, J. (1869). "Some notes on facts in the biography of Sir Simonds D'Ewes". Archaeological Journal. 26: 323–38. doi:10.1080/00665983.1869.10851454.
- Coates, Willson Havelock, ed. (1942). The Journal of Sir Simonds D'Ewes from the first recess of the Long Parliament to the withdrawal of King Charles from London. New Haven: Yale University Press.
- Halliwell, James Orchard, ed. (1845). The Autobiography and Correspondence of Sir Simonds D'Ewes: during the reigns of James I and Charles I. Vol. 1. London: Richard Bentley. and vol. 2
- McGee, J. Sears (2015). An Industrious Mind: the worlds of Sir Simonds D'Ewes. Stanford, CA: Stanford University Press. ISBN 9780804785464.
- Watson, Andrew G. (1966). The Library of Sir Simonds D'Ewes. London: British Museum.

Baronetage of England
New creation	Baronet (of Stowlangtoft Hall); 1641–1650	Succeeded by Willoughby d'Ewes
