= George Eglisham =

Scottish physician and poet

George Eglisham (fl. 1612–1642) was a Scottish physician and poet although he is best known as the author of a pamphlet he published in 1626, The Forerunner of Revenge, in which he alleged that George Villiers, 1st Duke of Buckingham, poisoned both James Hamilton, 2nd Marquess of Hamilton, and King James VI and I in March 1625.

== Life ==
He was introduced at the age of three to the favourable notice of James VI of Scotland by the Marquis of Hamilton. He was brought up with Hamilton's son (later the 2nd Marquis, d. 1625), who remained his friend and patron. He was sent abroad and studied at Leyden, where he probably obtained his M.D. degree. While there he engaged in a one-sided controversy with Conrad Vorst, whom he accused of atheism. Eglisham obtained leave from the authorities at Leyden to invite Vorst to a public discussion, but Vorst declined to take up the challenge.

Returning to Scotland, Eglisham was appointed one of the king's personal physicians in 1616, and continued to receive tokens of favour from James, who, according to Eglisham, 'daily augmented them in writ, in deed; and accompanied them with gifts, patents, offices' (Prodromus Vindictæ). But of these honours no record remains.

Proceedings were instituted against Eglisham after his pamphlet against Buckingham, but he had left for Brussels. There he remained for some years, perhaps until his death, the date and place of which are unknown. He was apparently still alive in 1642.

However, the statement (fl. 1612–1642), which appears in both the 1889 and 2004 editions of The Dictionary of National Biography, may be incorrect since there is evidence to suggest that Eglisham was murdered in Holland during the period 1626–1628.

== Works ==
He published Hypocrisis Apologeticæ Orationis Vorstianæ, cum secunda provocatione ad Conradum Vorstium missa; auctore Geo. Eglisemmio, Scot. Phil. et Medico Vorstium iterato Atheismi, Ethneismi, Judaismi, Turcismi, hæreseos schismatiet ignorantiæ apud illustrissimos ordines accusante, Delft, 1612. The preface to this work is dated from the Hague, 1 June 1612. In 1618 Eglisham published Duellum poeticum contendentibus G. Eglisemmio medico regio, et G. Buchanano, regio preceptore pro dignitate paraphraseos Psalmi civ. In a dedication to the king he undertook to prove that George Buchanan, who died in 1582, had been guilty of 'impiety towards God, perfidy to his prince, and tyranny to muses.' Eglisham gave a pedantic verbal criticism of Buchanan's Latin version of the psalm in question, which he printed in full, with his own translation opposite. Included in the volume are a number of the author's short Latin poems and epigrams. Eglisham vainly appealed to the university of Paris to decide that Buchanan's version was inferior.

He succeeded in attracting notice to himself, and drew from his colleague Arthur Johnston a mock Consilium collegii medici Parisiensis de mania G. Eglishemii, a Latin elegiac poem republished as Hypermorus Medicaster; and from his friend William Barclay a more serious judgment on the question at issue, which he decided in favour of Buchanan. Eglisham further published in 1626 Prodromus Vindictæ, a pamphlet in which he openly accused George Villiers, 1st Duke of Buckingham of having caused the deaths, by poison, of the Marquis of Hamilton and the late king, and petitioned Charles I and the parliament severally to have the duke put on his trial. A German translation appeared the same year, but the earliest English edition known of the Forerunner of Revenge bears the date 1642. A letter of the period mentions the work as an English publication, 20 May 1626.

== Family ==
Eglisham married Elizabeth Downes on 13 September 1617 in the Clink, and had a daughter.
