= Thomas Capp =

English painter

Thomas Capp or Cappe (died 1635) was a London-based painter and gilder.

== Background ==
Records of Capp's work indicate that he often worked painting and gilding furniture. He became a master of the Painter and Stainer's company in 1621. His father, also Thomas Capp, was a painter in London, and signed a petition of the Painter and Stainer's company in 1578.

== Works ==
In January 1610 he was paid for painting chairs and stools for Anne of Denmark and working on some velvet curtains. After her death in 1619, Capp and seven associates petitioned King James for payment of £1600 for household work supplied to the queen. His co-petitioners were; William Thompson, joiner; Isobell Shawe and Christopher Shawe, embroiderers; Jasper Heely, silkman; John Salusbury, Thomas Edwards and Gilbert Hart upholsterers.

Among the petitioners, the embroiderers were a couple, Christopher Shawe and Isobel Buttes had married in 1589. Christopher Shawe was an embroiderer to Anne of Denmark and King James. Shawe embroidered costume for the masque, Tethys' Festival, work described as, "against the Prince his highness creation for a maske". Thomas Edwards converted caparisons into wall hangings for Lady Anne Clifford and Richard Sackville, 3rd Earl of Dorset for use in a long gallery.

At this time furniture was decorated with decorated with painted and gilt arabesque patterns, such work was called "rebesking" in accounts. Capp painted furniture for Lionel Cranfield, 1st Earl of Middlesex, some pieces "laid red and wrought with white", working with Oliver Browne and John Baker. He painted and gilded with gold and silver a bed provided by the draper Hugh Goddard for Robert Spencer, 1st Baron Spencer. Capp supplied four "tops" or finials to a bed at Belvoir Castle for Francis Manners, 6th Earl of Rutland in March 1620.
