= Mary Stuart (1605–1607) =

English-Scottish princess

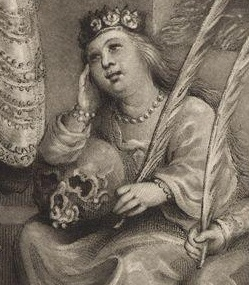
- Mary accompanies her siblings in an 1814 mezzo-tint by Willem van de Passe
- Born: 8 April 1605; Greenwich Palace, Greenwich, London, England
- Died: 16 September 1607 (aged 2); Stanwell Park, Stanwell, England
- Burial: 23 September 1607; Westminster Abbey, London
- House: Stuart
- Father: James VI and I
- Mother: Anne of Denmark

Mary Stuart (8 April 1605 – 16 September 1607) was the third daughter and sixth child of James VI and I and Anne of Denmark. Her birth was much anticipated. She developed pneumonia at 17 months and died the following year.

== Preparations ==
The first child to be born to Anne and James after James succeeded Elizabeth I as monarch of England, her birth was thus awaited with much excitement among both the Scottish and the English. The queen's doctors advised her to go Greenwich Palace in December 1604 because it was thought to be healthier. There was an outbreak of smallpox at court and the doctors tried to stop her visiting a favourite maid of honour who had fallen ill. Anne went to Greenwich after the performance of the Masque of Blackness in January, as Dudley Carleton described it, "to lay down her great belly".

The nobility and gentry competed for places in the establishment for the unborn child. In January 1605 Sir Richard Leveson talked to one of the royal physicians, and had courtiers praise Anne Newdigate to the queen in an unsuccessful attempt to get her made nurse. Samuel Calvert said there would be 40 or more nurses and women to rock the cradle and other positions.

Even a few days before the birth, Anne had not decided who would be the midwife and kept three women near her, without making a choice. Finally, Alice Dennis was chosen and received a reward of £100.

The cost of rich fabrics ordered by the king for the christening went up to £300, currently worth around £790,000. Linen provided by Audrey Walsingham to be used by the queen in childbed and by the baby in the first year cost £600. A crimson velvet and damask bed with a canopy or "sparver" for the queen cost £908.

== Life ==
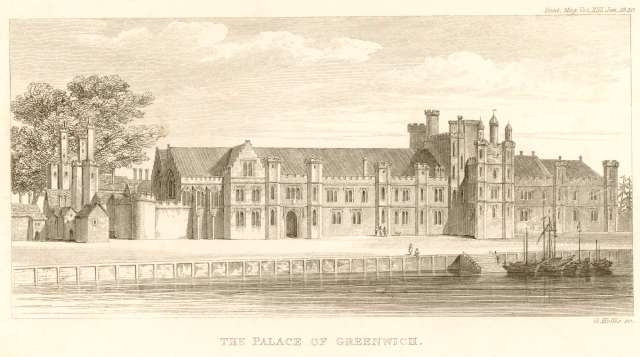
Greenwich Palace, Mary's birthplace.

On 8 April 1605, at Greenwich Palace, attended by the physician Martin Schöner, Anne of Denmark delivered a girl. Although the peoples of King James were slightly disappointed, the birth of the first princess of the two united realms was a cause for celebration. Throughout the realms, bonfires were lit and church bells rung all day long; the celebrations were encouraged by the fact that 68 years had elapsed since the birth of a child to an English sovereign, the last being Edward VI. The next day, King James drank health to his wife and new daughter.

In letters announcing Mary's birth to his relatives, James described her as "a most beautiful infant" and punned on her not-yet-revealed name, saying that "if I would not pray to the Virgin Mary, I would pray for the Virgin Mary." The name seems to have been chosen in honour of her grandmother Mary, Queen of Scots.

Preparations for a royal christening started immediately after the birth. The location decided upon was the chapel at Greenwich Palace and the date, 5 May. For the ceremony, a processional route through the palace courtyards was lined with broad-cloth.

Mary was carried by Elizabeth de Vere, Countess of Derby, who was supported by the Dukes of Holstein and Lennox. The infant's clothing, a train of purple velvet, embroidered with gold and furred with ermines, was supported by two countesses, being so long that it fell to the ground. The archbishop of Canterbury, Richard Bancroft, christened the child with the name Mary, as her godparents, Ulrik of Denmark, brother to the queen, Lady Arbella Stuart, first cousin to the king, and Dorothy Percy, Countess of Northumberland, had decided to name her. According to the Venetian ambassador, Nicolò Molin, she was named after her grandmother Mary, Queen of Scots. Immediately after the ceremony was complete, the noblemen put on their coats and the trumpets sounded. As a way to further celebrate this joyful occasion, the king presented Queen Anne with new jewelry and created several new peerages. The gifts included jewels and buttons worth £1,550 provided by Arnold Lulls and Philip Jacobson.

On 19 May 1605, Anne of Denmark, who had no role at the christening, was "churched". This ceremony took place at Greenwich Palace. The king and the lords heard a sermon in the King's Closet. He then went into the Chapel. The Queen came from her private lodging, where she had had her "laying in", to her Closet with a train of ladies. Some of the lords came to bring her into the Chapel, and she came to the altar supported by the Dukes of Holstein and Lennox, then went to her seat in a canopy called a "traverse" opposite the king. After prayers and music the king and queen came to the altar together and embraced, then walked to the door of the King's Presence Chamber.

Mary was given into the care of Sir Thomas Knyvet, afterwards Lord Knyvet, who helped arrest Guy Fawkes and stop the Gunpowder Plot. On 1 June 1605, Mary was sent to Stanwell, Middlesex, to Knyvet's residence. He built new lodgings for the women of Mary's household. He was given £20 per week for the infant princess's diet and that of her suite, consisting of six rockers and several inferior attendants; but the King himself paid their wages, the expenses of moving young Mary from house to house, of her coach and horses and other such costs. Elizabeth Hayward, Knyvet's wife, took great care of her "royal charge" during her short life.

Alice Wright, the wife of William Redshaw, a gentlewoman who had hoped to be a nurse to Mary, and was lodged in the Strand, was suspected of involvement in the Gunpowder Plot by Sir Edward Hoby and Thomas Posthumous Hoby. She was a sister of John and Christopher Wright, and an acquaintance of Thomas Percy.

== Death and burial ==
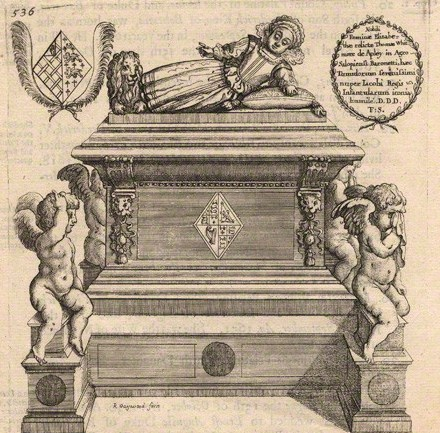
A later depiction of Mary's tomb.

At 17 months old, Mary contracted a violent cold that developed into pneumonia. She was constantly feverish and Queen Anne was called to Stanwell and frequently visited her young child. The royal physician Martin Schöner was summoned to attend the "sweet Lady Mary".

An eyewitness account later preached at her funeral stated that "such was the manner of her death, as bred a kind of admiration in us all that were present to behold it. For, whereas the new-tuned organs of her speech, by reason of her wearisome and tedious sickness, had been so greatly weakened, that for the space of twelve or fourteen hours at the least, there was no sound of any word heard breaking from her lips; yet when it sensibly appeared that she would soon make a peaceful end of a troublesome life, she sighed out these words, 'I go, I go!' and when, not long after, there was something to be ministered unto her by those that attended her in the time of her sickness, fastening her eye upon them with a constant look, again she repeated 'Away, I go!' And yet, a third time, almost immediately before she offered up herself, a sweet virgin sacrifice, unto Him that made her, faintly cried 'I go, I go!' The more strange did this appear to us that heard it, in that it was almost incredible that so much vigor should still remain in so weak a body; and whereas she had used many other words in the time of her extremity, yet now at last, as if directed by supernatural inspiration, she did so aptly utter these, and none but these."

Mary died at Stanwell on 16 September 1607. According to Rowland Whyte, she had suffered a "burning fever for 24 days, and a continual rheum fell to her lungs and putrified there, which she had not strength to void".

As soon as Mary died, the Earl of Worcester, the Earl of Leicester and the Earl of Totnes went to Hampton Court Palace, to inform the queen of her daughter's death. Seeing the three men before her, Queen Anne realized what had happened and spared the men the task of telling her. After showing the normal maternal signs of sorrow, she demanded that the king be told of Mary's death, an autopsy performed and a funeral prepared. Thus, a private ceremony took place at Westminster Abbey's Henry VII Lady Chapel on 23 September and Mary's embalmed body was buried opposite of her sister Sophia's tomb.

The funeral sermon was given by Jeremy Leech (died 1644). He addressed the grief of Lady Elizabeth Knyvett, the Princess' "tutor", rather than the sorrow of her mother. The sermon was published soon after as A Sermon Preached before the Lords of Council, in K. Henry the Seavenths Chapell, Sept. 23, 1607 At the Funerall of the most excellent & hopefull Princess, the Lady Marie's Grace.

Her effigy, created by Maximilian Colt, represented a young girl, clad in a mature dress, with the traditional ruff, carved in ivory. It reads (or read in the nineteenth century) "I, Mary, daughter of James, King of Great Britain, France and Ireland and of Queen Anne, received into heaven in early infancy, found joy for myself, but left longings for my parents, on the 16th of September, 1607. Ye congratulators, condole: she lived only 1 year [sic, according to Everett Green] 5 months and 88 days."

== Servants and rockers ==
Mary Stuart's servants were included a list of royal households made in March 1606: Marie Thomson (wet nurse), Elizabeth Townsend, Mabell Lynley, Anne Bartie, Katherine Paddy, Margaret George (usher), Anne Prodgers, Anthony Knyvett, Arthur Bodren, Mary London.

The six women appointed as "rockers" to rock her cradle petitioned the queen for pensions of £30 a year. A wet nurse or "milch nurse", Mary Thompson, wife of Samuel Thompson, Windsor Herald, who became a "dry nurse" with duties to dress Lady Mary, claimed pay or pension. Margaret George claimed an annuity as an usher to Lady Mary. A necklace of knots of pearls and rubies that James had given to Mary Stuart was presented to her nurse.

It was intended that Mary would live at St James's Palace. A nursery was built for her and a wash house. The buildings were timber framed with brick chimneys.

== Ancestors ==
Ancestors of Mary Stuart (1605–1607)

8. Matthew Stewart, 4th Earl of Lennox
4. Henry Stuart, Lord Darnley
9. Margaret Douglas
2. James VI and I
10. James V of Scotland
5. Mary, Queen of Scots
11. Mary of Guise
1. Princess Mary of England
12. Christian III of Denmark
6. Frederick II of Denmark
13. Dorothea of Saxe-Lauenburg
3. Anne of Denmark
14. Ulrich, Duke of Mecklenburg
7. Sophie of Mecklenburg-Güstrow
15. Elisabeth of Denmark
