= Philip Benedict =

American historian (born 1949)

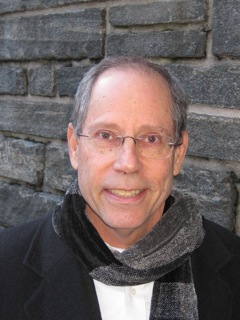
- Born: 20 August 1949 (age 77); Washington, D.C.
- Education: Cornell University (B.A. 1970); Princeton University (Ph.D. 1975)
- Occupations: Professor, historian

Philip Benedict (born 20 August 1949) is an American historian of the Protestant Reformation in Europe, currently holding the title of Professor Emeritus (profeseur honoraire) at the University of Geneva’s Institute for Reformation History (l'Institut d'histoire de la Réformation).

== Early life ==
Benedict was born in Washington, D.C., on 20 August 1949 to the astrophysicist William S. Benedict and the medical doctor and print collector Ruth B. Benedict. He has stated that he is agnostic and that his parents raised him in a secular Jewish household, wholly disconnected from the Calvinism in which he would come to specialize. Benedict graduated from Woodrow Wilson High School in Washington DC in 1966.

== Training ==
Benedict received his B.A. from Cornell University in 1970, where he studied early modern European history with H.G. Koenigsberger. He completed his M.A. in 1972 and his Ph.D. in 1975 at Princeton University, under the direction of Theodore K. Rabb and Lawrence Stone. While conducting his dissertation research in France, Benedict also followed the seminar of Denis Richet at what was then the VIe Section of the École Pratique des Hautes Études.

== Research ==
Benedict’s publications have ranged from economic history to the history of printmaking and information, but have chiefly focused on the social and political history of the Reformation, with primary reference to the French Wars of Religion and the Protestant minority in sixteenth and seventeenth-century France.

Benedict's first book, Rouen during the Wars of Religion, has been described as a "model study of the interaction of social, religious, and political factors in French religious wars" by the American Historical Association Guide to Historical Literature. His Christ's Churches Purely Reformed: A Social History of Calvinism was awarded the 2003 Philip Schaff Prize from the American Society of Church History, and the 2004 Phyllis Goodhart Gordan Prize from The Renaissance Society of America.

In contrast to Denis Crouzet and Natalie Davis, who have explored the motivations and psychology behind Roman Catholic religious violence in early modern France, Benedict has asserted various motivations and reasons that Huguenots engaged in religious violence against Catholics. Benedict has stated that three important factors inspired French Protestants to wage war against their Catholic adversaries: (1) John Calvin’s condemnation of “Nicodemism,” (2) Reformed polemical treatises and sermons against Catholic images, and (3) the Huguenot belief that the 1562 Edict of January was under direct assault by overzealous Catholics, and thus needed to be defended by force of arms.

== Career ==
Benedict became a Professor Emeritus (professeur honoraire) at the University of Geneva in 2015. He held the title of professeur ordinaire at the University of Geneva's Institute for Reformation History for nine years prior to his retirement. Benedict served as the Director of the Institute from 2006–2009.

Benedict taught at Brown University for 26 years, where he was the Willard Prescott and Annie McClelland Smith Professor of Religious Studies.

He has held visiting positions or fellowships at Cornell University, the Institute for Advanced Study in Princeton, New Jersey, All Souls College, Oxford, the School for Advanced Studies in the Social Sciences (Paris), the Lumière University Lyon 2, Humboldt University (Berlin), and the National Gallery of Art's Center for Advanced Study in the Visual Arts (Washington, D.C.).

Benedict has published five monographs, one collection of documents, edited (or co-edited) thirty-five edited volumes, and contributed chapters to five edited volumes, nineteen peer-reviewed articles in journals. He has published book reviews in Le Monde, The American Historical Review, Journal of Modern History, The Sixteenth Century Journal, Journal of Interdisciplinary History, Annales: E.S.C., Catholic Historical Review, Social History, Volkskundig Bulletin, Archiv für Reformationsgeschichte Literaturbericht, Journal of Economic History, French History, Journal of Ecclesiastical History, Journal of American History, Bibliothèque d'Humanisme et Renaissance, and The English Historical Review.

== Teaching ==
Benedict has led the Institut d'histoire de la Réformation's intensive graduate seminars (cours d'été), which attract a wide range of participants to Geneva from institutions across Europe and North America.

Several late medieval and early modern historians have credited him with supervising their dissertations, including Michael Breen, Larissa Taylor, and Liam Brockey. Taylor and Brockey's first books, both of which began as dissertations under Benedict's supervision, have gone on to win major book prizes.

== Works ==
=== Monographs ===
- — (22 January 2004) [1981]. Rouen During the Wars of Religion. Cambridge University Press. ISBN 978-0-521-54797-0.
- — (1991). "The Huguenot Population of France, 1600-1685: The Demographic Fate and Customs of a Religious Minority". Transactions of the American Philosophical Society. 81 (5). Philadelphia: American Philosophical Society: i–164. doi:10.2307/1006507. ISSN 0065-9746. JSTOR 1006507.
- — (2001). The faith and fortunes of France's Huguenots, 1600-85. Aldershot: Ashgate. ISBN 978-0-7546-0225-5.
- — (2002). Christ's Churches Purely Reformed: A Social History of Calvinism. New Haven: Yale University Press. ISBN 978-0-300-08812-0.
- — (2007). Graphic History: The Wars, Massacres and Troubles of Tortorel and Perrissin. Geneva: Librairie Droz. ISBN 978-2-600-00440-4. Revised and abridged French translation, — (2012). Le regard saisit l'histoire : Les Guerres, Massacres et Troubles de Tortorel et Perrissin. Geneva: Librairie Droz. ISBN 978-2-600-00547-0.

=== Edited and co-edited volumes ===
- — (2007) [1989]. Cities and Social Change in Early Modern France. Geneva: Librairie Droz. ISBN 978-2-600-00440-4.
- With Marnef, G.; van Nierop, H.; Venard, M. (1999). Reformation, Revolt and Civil War in France and the Netherlands 1555-1585. Amsterdam: Royal Netherlands Academy of Arts and Sciences.
- With Gutmann, Myron P. (2005). Early Modern Europe: From Crisis to Stability. Newark: University of Delaware Press. ISBN 978-0-87413-906-8.
- With Menchi, Silvana Seidel; Tallon, Alain (2007). La réforme en France et en Italie: contacts, comparaisons et contrastes : [actes du colloque international de Rome, 27-29 octobre 2005]. Rome: École française de Rome. ISBN 978-2-7283-0790-6.
- With Backus, Irena (8 September 2011). Calvin and His Influence, 1509-2009. Oxford: Oxford University Press. ISBN 978-0-19-975184-6.
- With Fornerod, Nicolas (2012). L'organisation et l'action des églises réformées de France. Geneva: Librairie Droz. ISBN 978-2-600-01603-2.

=== Selected chapters in edited volumes ===
- — (21 September 1995) [1993]. "The Historiography of Continental Calvinism". In Lehmann, Hartmut; Roth, Guenther (eds.). Weber's Protestant Ethic: Origins, Evidence, Contexts. Cambridge University Press. pp. 205–326. ISBN 978-0-521-55829-7.
- — (20 June 2002) [1996]. "Un roi, une loi, deux fois: parameters for the history of Catholic-Reformed co-existence in France, 1555–1685". In Grell, Ole Peter; Scribner, Bob (eds.). Tolerance and Intolerance in the European Reformation. Cambridge: Cambridge University Press. pp. 65–93. ISBN 978-0-521-89412-8.
- — (2006). "Religion and Politics in Europe, 1500–1700". In Von Greyerz, Kaspar; Siebenhüner, Kim (eds.). Religion und Gewalt: Konflikte, Rituale, Deutungen (1500-1800). Göttingen: Vandenhoeck & Ruprecht. pp. 155–174. ISBN 978-3-525-35867-2.

=== Selected articles ===
- — (2009) [1978]. "The Saint Bartholomew's Massacres in the Provinces". The Historical Journal. 21 (2): 205–225. doi:10.1017/S0018246X00000510. S2CID 159715479.
- — (1996). "Faith, Fortune, and Social Structure in Seventeenth-Century Montpellier". Past & Present (152): 46–78. doi:10.1093/past/152.1.46.
- — (2008). "Divided memories? Historical calendars, commemorative processions and the recollection of the Wars of Religion during the ancien regime". French History. 22 (4): 381–405. doi:10.1093/fh/crn046.
- With Fornerod, Nicolas (2009). "Les 2150 "églises" réformées de France de 1561-1562". Revue historique. 651 (3): 529–560. doi:10.3917/rhis.093.0529.
- — (2012). "Prophets in Arms? Ministers in War, Ministers on War: France 1562-74". Past & Present (suppl 7): 163–196. doi:10.1093/pastj/gtr022. ISSN 0031-2746.
- —; Bryant, Larry; Neuschel, Kristen (2005). "Graphic History: What Readers Knew and Were Taught in the Quarante Tableaux of Perrissin and Tororel". French Historical Studies. 28 (2): 175–230. doi:10.1215/00161071-28-2-175. Awarded the Nancy Lyman Roelker Prize by the Sixteenth Century Studies Conference.
