= Jackson J. Spielvogel =

United States historian and educator

- Born: 1939 (age 86–87)
- Occupation: Associate Professor Emeritus of History

Academic background
- Education: Ohio State University, Ohio

Academic work
- Discipline: Historic Knowledge
- Institutions: Pennsylvania State University, Professor
- Notable works: Western Civilization, World History

Jackson Joseph Spielvogel is Associate Professor Emeritus of History at Pennsylvania State University. His textbooks on world history, Western civilization and Nazi Germany are widely adopted in middle school, high school, and college history courses throughout the United States. Spielvogel holds a Ph.D. from Ohio State University where he specialized in Reformation history under the supervision of Harold J. Grimm.

== Career ==
As a professor at Pennsylvania State University, Spielvogel was influential in the development of university's Western civilization curricula and he authored best-selling textbooks on the subject. Throughout his teaching career, Spielvogel was widely known for his popular History 143: History of Nazism and Fascism course, which attracted thousands of students over the decades in which he taught it.

His articles and reviews have appeared in journals such as the Morena, Journal of General Education, The Catholic Historical Review, Archiv für Reformationsgeschichte, The American Historical Review, and Utopian Studies. He has also been the contributor of various chapters or articles to The Social History of the Reformation, The Holy Roman Empire: A Dictionary Handbook, and the Simon Wiesenthal Center Annual of Holocaust Studies. In addition to funding and fellowships he earned from the Fulbright Foundation and the Foundation for Reformation Research, Spielvogel won five major teaching awards at Penn State including the university's most prestigious teaching award in 1988-1989, the Penn State Teaching Fellowship.

== Writings ==
Spielvogel is the author of several textbooks commonly used in both college history and high school AP European History courses, including Western Civilization, and he has also adapted his historical work for elementary and middle school textbooks. His book Hitler and Nazi Germany was first published in 1987, with recent editions coauthored by David Redles. Along with William J. Duiker, he is also the co-author of World History and The Essential World History, both in their ninth editions.

- Discovering Our Past: A History of the World, Early Ages (2018) ISBN 9780076767380
- The Essential World History (9th Edition—2020) ISBN 9780357026861
- Hitler and Nazi Germany: A History (8th Edition—2020) ISBN 9781138544437
- Western Civilization (11th Edition—2020) ISBN 9780357362976
- World History (9th Edition—2017) ISBN 9781337401050
- World History and Geography (2021) ISBN 9780076938681
