= Harreld =

Harreld is a surname. Notable people with the surname include:

- Bruce Harreld (born 1950), American businessman and academic administrator
- Donald J. Harreld, American historian
- John W. Harreld (1872-1950), American politician
- Kemper Harreld (1885–1971), American violinist

== See also ==
- Harrold (surname)
