= Basilikon Doron =

1599 treatise by James VI of Scotland

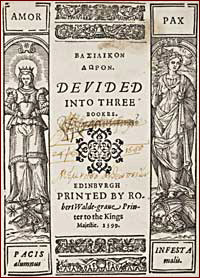
Title page of the Basilikon Doron

The Basilikon Doron is a treatise on government written by King James VI of Scotland (who would later also become James I of England), in 1599.

== Background ==
Basilikon Doron (Βασιλικὸν Δῶρον) means "royal gift" in Ancient Greek and was written in the form of a private letter to James's eldest son, Henry, Duke of Rothesay (1594–1612). After Henry's death, James gave it to his second son, Charles, born 1600, later King Charles I. Seven copies were printed in Edinburgh in 1599, and it was republished in London in 1603, when it sold in the thousands.

== Content ==
This document is separated into three books, serving as general guidelines to follow to be an efficient monarch. The first describes a king's duty towards God as a Christian. The second focuses on the roles and responsibilities in office. The third concerns proper behaviour in daily life.

As the first part is concerned with being a good Christian, James instructed his son to love and respect God as well as to fear Him. Furthermore, it is essential to carefully study the Scripture (the Bible) and especially specific books in both the Old and New Testaments. Lastly, he must pray often and always be thankful for what God has given him. The first book additionally highlights the fact that God is the one who elevates the individual to kingship over a country as the basis for the King's heightened accountability to God.

In the second book, James addresses how to govern with a proper concern for the law and justice. James encouraged his son to be a good king, as opposed to a tyrant, by establishing and executing laws as well as governing with justice and equality, such as by boosting the economy. It is important to invite foreign merchants into the country and to base the currency on gold and silver. Likewise, according to James,

- A good monarch must be well acquainted with his subjects and so it would be wise to visit each of the kingdoms every three years.
- During war, he should choose old but good captains to lead an army of young and agile soldiers.
- In the court and the household, he should carefully select loyal gentlemen and servants to surround him. When the time came to choose a wife, it would be best if she were of the same religion and had a generous estate. However, she must not meddle with governmental politics but perform her domestic duties.
- As for inheritance, to ensure stability, the kingdom should be left to the eldest son, not divided among all children.
- Lastly, it is most important to James that his son would know well his own craft, which is to properly govern over his subjects. To do so, he must study the laws of his kingdom and actively participate in the council.
- Furthermore, he must be acquainted with mathematics for military purposes and world history for foreign policy.

The final portion of the Basilikon Doron focuses on the daily life of a monarch. James introduces the idea that the daily life of the King is lived like a fish in a bowl, and every action is examined by friend and foe alike. It is important for the King to set an example for his subjects by his actions. For instance, James advised his son to eat meat to be strong for traveling, and during wartime.

- He must also not drink and sleep excessively.
- Furthermore, his wardrobe should always be clean and proper, and he must never let his hair and nails grow long.
- In his writing and speech, he should use honest and plain language.

All of these guidelines composed an underlying code of conduct to be followed by all monarchs and heads of state to rule and govern efficiently. James assembled these directions as a result of his own experience and upbringing. He, therefore, offered the Basilikon Doron to his son with the hope of rendering him a capable ruler and perhaps to pass it down to future generations.

Overall, it repeats the argument for the divine right of kings, as set out in The True Law of Free Monarchies, which was also written by James. It warns against "Papists" and derides Puritans, in keeping with his philosophy of following a "middle path", which is also reflected in the preface to the 1611 King James Bible. It also advocates removing the Apocrypha from the Bible.

== Publication ==
The published Basilikon Doron may well have been intended to portray the king in a favourable light. James Sempill assisted James in composing it. Robert Waldegrave, who was bound to secrecy, printed seven copies at the king's behest. Henry Taylor said that he had printed it on Waldegrave's press. Richard Royston and then William Dugard printed further copies.

== See also ==
- Eikon Basilike
- Daemonologie
- The True Law of Free Monarchies
