= Stanford Lehmberg =

Historian

Stanford E. Lehmberg (1931 – June 14, 2012) was an American historian and professor.

== Early life and schooling ==
Stanford E. Lehmberg was born in McPherson, Kansas on 23 September 1931. Lehmberg's father was a Kansas dealer in farm implements, who spent most of his life also managing a local bank. Lehmberg's mother was a teacher (of Latin) in Kansas public schools before Stanford was born. Lehmberg was a good student in McPherson public schools, and also received training in organ performance during his junior high and high school years.

Lehmberg attended the University of Kansas, receiving a BA degree (Humanities) in 1953 and an MA degree (History, specializing in Italian Renaissance) in 1954. After his MA, Lehmberg applied for and received a Fulbright Scholarship to study abroad, which he used at the University of Cambridge. He received a Ph.D. (1956) from Cambridge after completing a dissertation on Sir Thomas Elyot, author of the first Latin-English dictionary to be published in sixteenth-century England. In that effort Lehmberg worked extensively with noted English historian Sir Geoffrey Elton.

== Teaching career ==
While still in England Lehmberg received a job offer from the University of Texas at Austin. He taught British History at that University from 1956 to 1969. He found that institution's History Library to be almost non-existent in the British History section, and worked tirelessly to increase its size and stature, although during his entire time there the library's budget was quite limited.

When esteemed historian and professor David Harris Willson retired from the University of Minnesota, Lehmberg was invited to move to Minnesota. He taught at UM from 1969 to 1998, twice chairing the History Department, and in 2000 co-authoring a history of the university.

== Writing career ==
Lehmberg's Ph.D. thesis eventually evolved into his first book, Sir Thomas Elyot, Tudor Humanist (1960). He then wrote a modernized edition of Elyot's book Book Named the Governor (1962). His next book was a history of Sir Walter Mildmay's political career, Sir Walter Mildmay and Tudor Government (1964). Later came The Reformation Parliament, 1529-1536 (1970), with a sequel The Later Parliaments of Henry VIII, 1536-1547 (1977). He wrote a history of English cathedrals The Reformation of Cathedrals: Cathedrals in English Society, 1485-1603 (1988), and a comprehensive period history, The Peoples of the British Isles, from Prehistoric Times to 1688 (1991), and concluded with another study of cathedrals, Cathedral Under Siege: Cathedrals in English Society, 1600-1700 (1996). With another UM professor, he wrote The University of Minnesota, 1945-2000 (2000, co-author with Ann M. Pflaum)

Lehmberg has written many articles, some of which are listed here:

- Archbishop Grindal and the Prophesyings, Historical Magazine of the Protestant Episcopal Church (1965)
- Early Tudor Parliamentary Procedure: Provisos in the Legislation of the Reformation Parliament, E.H.R. (1966)
- Parliamentary Attainder in the Reign of Henry VIII, Historical Journal (1975)
- The Reformation of Choirs: Cathedral Musical Establishments in Tudor England, Tudor Rule and Revolution: Essays for G.R. Elton from his American Friends (1982)
- Henry VIII and the Cathedrals, Huntington Library Quarterly (1986)
- Writings of English Cathedral Clergy (1600-1700), Anglican Theological Review (1993)

Other Lehmberg articles appeared in Studies in the Renaissance, in The Historian, and in Archiv für Reformationsgeschichte. He wrote over 100 book reviews, and served on the editorial boards of The Historian and The Sixteenth Century Journal. He was president of the Midwest Conference on British Studies, and a member of the Council of the American Historical Association.

== Academic and career honors ==
- Recipient of Fulbright Scholarship (1954-1956)
- Recipient of Guggenheim Fellowship (1956-1966)
- Recipient of British Academy grant (1974)
- Recipient of Folger Shakespeare Library grant (1974)
- Recipient of Guggenheim Fellowship (1985-1986)
- Awarded the Doctor of Letters degree by Cambridge University (1990)
- Elected Fellow of Society of Antiquaries of London (1997)

== Music efforts ==
Lehmberg considered university training as an organist, but learned that his organ repertoire upon entering the University of Kansas was about equal to what he would be taught in that university's curriculum, so he pursued other liberal-arts themes, eventually falling into the concentrated study of history. He planned on using his Fulbright Scholarship to study the history of the Italian Renaissance, but did not receive approval to study in Italy because he had not bothered to learn sufficient Italian. Therefore, he ended up in London, and while there he took organ lessons on the side, while pursuing a Ph.D. degree (a normal three-year course that he managed to complete in two years). He studied with eminent British organist Sir Boris Ord.

Lehmberg worked with choirs and church musical groups both at Austin and St. Paul. He served on the board of Saint Paul Chamber Orchestra and on the board of Concentus Musicus (which performed antique music on period instruments) until its demise. For 28 years he was organist and choir director of St. Clement's Episcopal Church in St. Paul, Minnesota. He twice led the University's search for new heads of the university's Department of Music.

== Personal life ==
When Lehmberg arrived in Austin for his first teaching job, a graduate student in one of his classes was majoring in Library Science, specializing in rare-books librarianship. He began dating her, and soon they were married (Phyllis). She was a native Texan, and resisted the 1969 move to Minnesota, but eventually became very happy there.
