= James VI and I =

King of Scotland from 1567 to 1625, King of England and Ireland from 1603

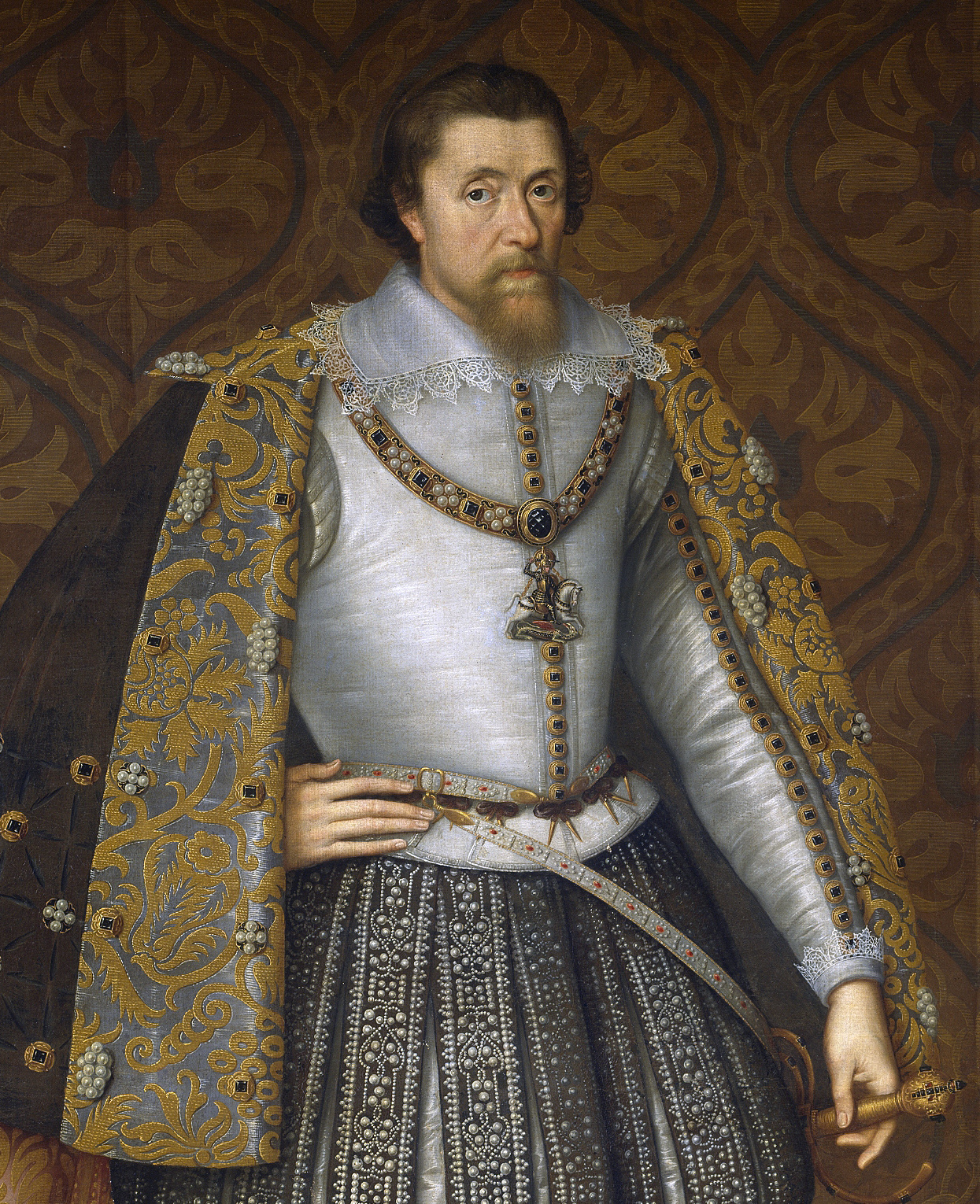
- Portrait, c. 1605

King of Scotland
- Reign: 24 July 1567 – 27 March 1625
- Coronation: 29 July 1567
- Predecessor: Mary
- Successor: Charles I
- Regents: See list: James Stewart, Earl of Moray (1567‍–‍1570); Matthew Stewart, Earl of Lennox (1570‍–‍1571); John Erskine, Earl of Mar (1571‍–‍1572); James Douglas, Earl of Morton (1572‍–‍1579)

King of England and Ireland
- Reign: 24 March 1603 – 27 March 1625
- Coronation: 25 July 1603
- Predecessor: Elizabeth I
- Successor: Charles I
- Born: 19 June 1566; Edinburgh Castle, Edinburgh, Scotland
- Died: 27 March 1625 (aged 58); Theobalds House, Hertfordshire, England
- Burial: 7 May 1625; Westminster Abbey
- Spouse: Anne of Denmark (m. 1589; died 1619)
- Issue more...: Henry Frederick, Prince of Wales; Elizabeth, Queen of Bohemia; Margaret; Charles I of England; Robert, Duke of Kintyre and Lorne; Mary; Sophia
Names
- James Charles Stuart
- House: Stuart
- Father: Henry Stuart, Lord Darnley
- Mother: Mary, Queen of Scots

James VI and I (James Charles Stuart; 19 June 1566 – 27 March 1625) was King of Scotland as James VI from 24 July 1567, and King of England and Ireland as James I from the union of the Scottish and English crowns on 24 March 1603, until his death in 1625. Though he long attempted to get both countries to adopt a closer political union, the kingdoms of Scotland and England remained distinct entities ruled by James in personal union, with their own parliaments, judiciaries and laws.

James was the son of Mary, Queen of Scots, and a great-great-grandson of Henry VII, King of England and Lord of Ireland, and thus a potential successor to all three thrones. He acceded to the Scottish throne at the age of thirteen months, after his mother was forced to abdicate. Although his mother was a Catholic, James was raised as a Protestant. Four regents governed during his minority, which ended officially in 1578, though he did not gain full control of his government until 1583. In 1589, he married Anne of Denmark. Three of their children survived to adulthood: Henry Frederick, Elizabeth, and Charles. In 1603, James succeeded his cousin Elizabeth I, the last Tudor monarch of England and Ireland, who had died childless. He reigned in all three kingdoms for 22 years, a period known as the Jacobean era, until he died in 1625. After the Union of the Crowns in 1603, he based himself in England, returning to Scotland only once in 1617, and styled himself King of Great Britain and Ireland. He advocated for a single parliament for England and Scotland. During his reign, the Plantation of Ulster and the English colonisation of the Americas began.

At 57 years and 246 days, James's reign in Scotland was the longest of any Scottish monarch. He achieved most of his aims in Scotland but faced great difficulties in England, including the Gunpowder Plot in 1605 and conflicts with the English Parliament. Under James, the "Golden Age" of Elizabethan literature and drama continued, with writers such as William Shakespeare, John Donne, Ben Jonson, and Francis Bacon contributing to a flourishing literary culture. James was a prolific writer, authoring works such as Daemonologie (1597), The True Law of Free Monarchies (1598), and Basilikon Doron (1599). He sponsored an early translation of the Bible into English (later named for him as the Authorized King James Version), and the 1604 revision of the Book of Common Prayer. (Note: "James VI and I was the most writerly of British monarchs. He produced original poetry, as well as translation and a treatise on poetics; works on witchcraft and tobacco; meditations and commentaries on the Scriptures; a manual on kingship; works of political theory; and, of course, speeches to parliament ... He was the patron of Shakespeare, Jonson, Donne, and the translators of the "Authorized version" of the Bible, surely the greatest concentration of literary talent ever to enjoy royal sponsorship in England.") Contemporary courtier Anthony Weldon claimed that James had been termed "the wisest fool in Christendom" (wise in small things, foolish otherwise), an epithet associated with his character ever since. Since the latter half of the 20th century, historians have tended to revise James's reputation and treat him as a serious and thoughtful monarch. He was strongly committed to a peace policy and tried to avoid involvement in religious wars, especially the Thirty Years' War that devastated much of Central Europe. He tried but failed to prevent the rise of hawkish elements in the English Parliament who desired war with Catholic Spain. The first English king of the House of Stuart, he was succeeded by his second son, Charles I.

== Early life ==
=== Birth ===
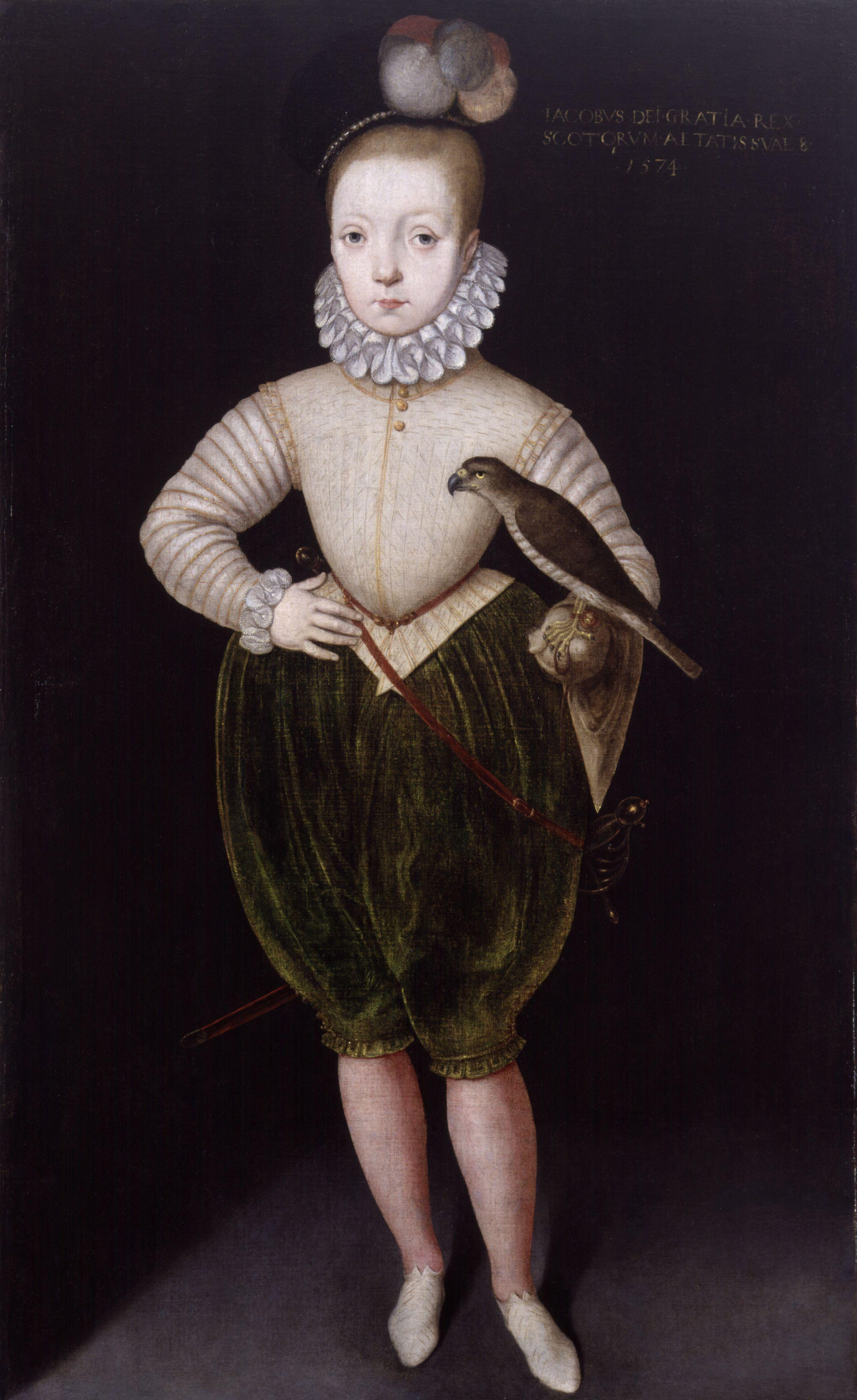
Portrait of James as a boy, after Arnold Bronckorst, 1574

James was the only son of Mary, Queen of Scots, and her second husband, Henry Stuart, Lord Darnley. Mary and Darnley were each great-grandchildren of Henry VII of England through Margaret Tudor, the older sister of Henry VIII. Mary's rule over Scotland was insecure, and she and her husband, being Roman Catholics, faced a rebellion by Protestant noblemen. During Mary and Darnley's difficult marriage, Darnley secretly allied himself with the rebels and conspired in the murder of the queen's private secretary, David Rizzio, just three months before James's birth.

James was born on 19 June 1566 at Edinburgh Castle, and as the eldest son and heir apparent of the monarch automatically became Duke of Rothesay and Prince and Great Steward of Scotland. Five days later, the English diplomat Henry Killigrew saw the queen, who had not fully recovered and could only speak faintly. The baby was "sucking at his nurse" and was "well proportioned and like to prove a goodly prince". He was baptised "Charles James" or "James Charles" on 17 December in a Catholic ceremony held at Stirling Castle. His godparents were Charles IX of France (represented by John, Count of Brienne), Elizabeth I of England (represented by Francis Russell, Earl of Bedford), and Emmanuel Philibert, Duke of Savoy (represented by ambassador Philibert du Croc). (Note: As the Earl of Bedford was a Protestant, his place in the ceremony was taken by Jean, Countess of Argyll.) Mary refused to let the Archbishop of St Andrews, whom she referred to as "a pocky priest", spit in the child's mouth, as was then the custom. The subsequent entertainment, devised by Frenchman Bastian Pagez, featured men dressed as satyrs and sporting tails, to which the English guests took offence, thinking the satyrs "done against them".

Lord Darnley was murdered on 10 February 1567 at Kirk o' Field, Edinburgh, perhaps in revenge for the killing of Rizzio. James inherited his father's titles of Duke of Albany and Earl of Ross. Mary was already unpopular, and her marriage three months later (on 15 May 1567) to James Hepburn, Earl of Bothwell, who was widely suspected of murdering Darnley, heightened widespread bad feeling toward her. (Note: Elizabeth I wrote to Mary: "My ears have been so astounded, my mind so disturbed and my heart so appalled at hearing the horrible report of the abominable murder of your late husband and my slaughtered cousin, that I can scarcely as yet summon the spirit to write about it ... I will not conceal from you that people for the most part are saying that you will look through your fingers at this deed instead of avenging it and that you don't care to take action against those who have done you this pleasure." Historian John Guy nonetheless concludes: "Not a single piece of uncontaminated evidence has ever been found to show that Mary had foreknowledge of Darnley's murder". In historian David Harris Willson's view, however: "That Bothwell was the murderer no one can doubt; and that Mary was his accomplice seems equally certain.") In June 1567, Protestant rebels arrested Mary and imprisoned her in Lochleven Castle; she never saw her son again. She was forced to abdicate on 24 July 1567 in favour of the infant James and to appoint her illegitimate half-brother James Stewart, 1st Earl of Moray, as regent. This made James the third consecutive Scottish monarch to ascend to the throne as an infant.

=== Childhood at Stirling Castle ===
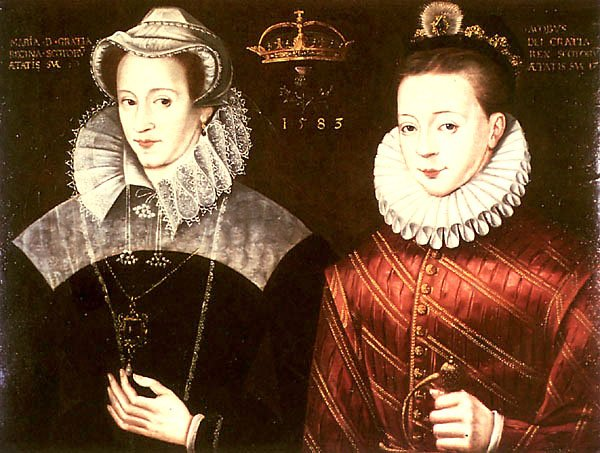
James (right) depicted aged 17 beside his mother, 1583. In reality, they were separated when he was still a baby.

The care of James was entrusted to the Earl and Countess of Mar, "to be conserved, nursed, and upbrought" in the security of Stirling Castle. James was anointed King of Scotland at the age of thirteen months at the Church of the Holy Rude in Stirling, by Adam Bothwell, Bishop of Orkney, on 29 July 1567. The sermon at the coronation was preached by John Knox.

In accordance with the religious beliefs of most of the Scottish ruling class, James was brought up as a member of the Protestant Church of Scotland, the Kirk. The Privy Council selected George Buchanan, Peter Young, Adam Erskine (lay abbot of Cambuskenneth), and David Erskine (lay abbot of Dryburgh) as James's preceptors or tutors. As the young king's senior tutor, Buchanan subjected James to regular beatings but also instilled in him a lifelong passion for literature and learning. Buchanan sought to turn James into a God-fearing, Protestant king who accepted the limitations of monarchy, as outlined in his treatise De Jure Regni apud Scotos. In 1573, the young king distributed Maundy money, and in 1577 he presented small gold rings to his companions as New Year's Day gifts. These annual rituals are among his first recorded acts of kingship.

=== Regencies ===
In 1568, Mary escaped from Lochleven Castle, leading to several years of sporadic violence. The Earl of Moray defeated Mary's troops at the Battle of Langside, forcing her to flee to England, where she was subsequently kept in confinement by Elizabeth. On 23 January 1570, Moray was assassinated by James Hamilton of Bothwellhaugh. This was the first assassination to use firearms. The next regent was James's paternal grandfather, Matthew Stewart, Earl of Lennox, who was carried fatally wounded into Stirling Castle a year later after a raid by Mary's supporters. His successor, the Earl of Mar, "took a vehement sickness" and died on 28 October 1572 at Stirling. Mar's illness, wrote James Melville, followed a banquet at Dalkeith Palace given by James Douglas, Earl of Morton.

Morton was elected to Mar's office and proved in many ways the most effective of James's regents, but he made enemies by his rapacity. He fell from favour when Frenchman Esmé Stewart, Sieur d'Aubigny, first cousin of James's father Lord Darnley, arrived in Scotland and quickly established himself as the first of James's powerful favourites. James was proclaimed an adult ruler in a ceremony of Entry to Edinburgh on 19 October 1579. Morton was executed on 2 June 1581, belatedly charged with complicity in Darnley's murder. On 8 August, James made Stewart Duke of Lennox, the only duke in Scotland. The king, then fifteen years old, remained under the influence of the Duke for about one more year.

== Rule in Scotland ==
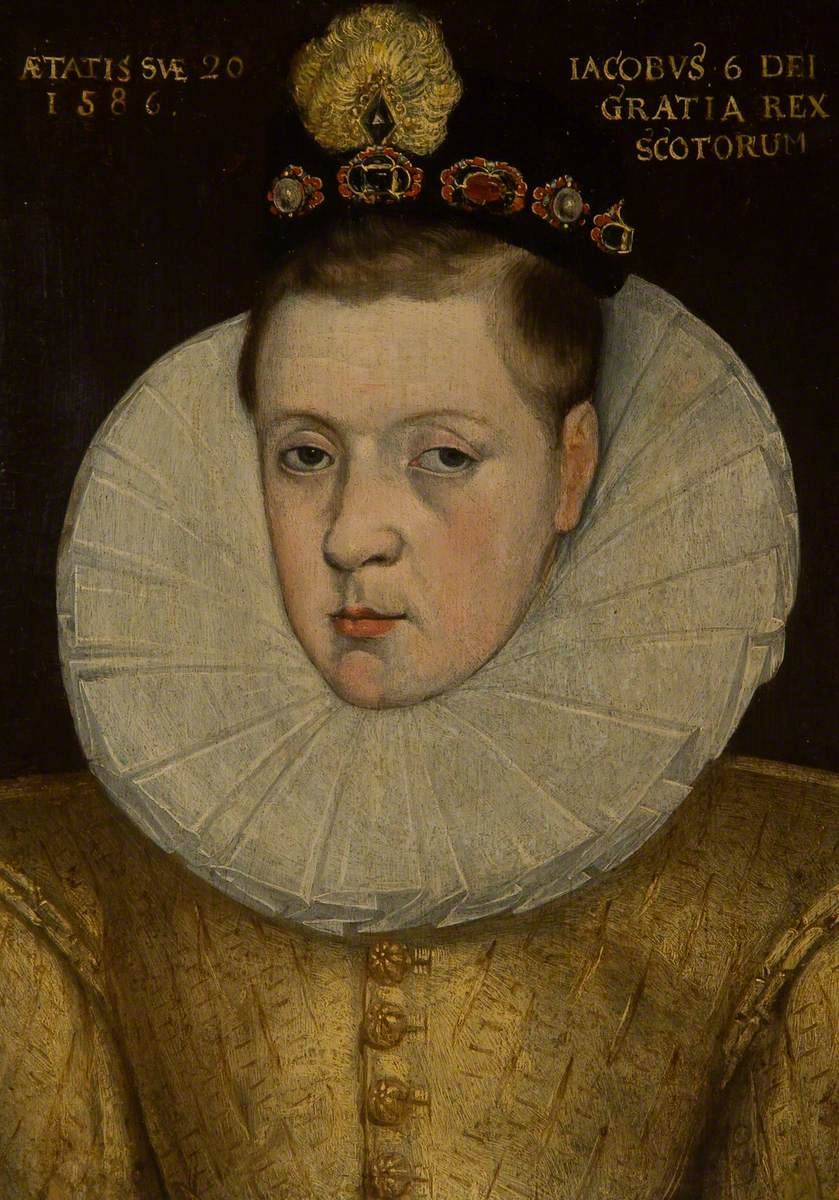
James in 1586, age 20 (attrib. Adrian Vanson or the school of Alonso Sánchez Coello)

James's favourite, the Duke of Lennox, was a Protestant convert, but he was distrusted by Scottish Calvinists who noticed the physical displays of affection between him and the king and alleged that Lennox "went about to draw the King to carnal lust". In August 1582, in what became known as the Ruthven Raid, the Protestant earls William Ruthven, Earl of Gowrie and Archibald Douglas, Earl of Angus lured James into Ruthven Castle, imprisoned him, (Note: James's captors forced from him a proclamation, dated 30 August, declaring that he was not being held prisoner "forced or constrained, for fear or terror, or against his will", and that no one should come to his aid as a result of "seditious or contrary reports".) and forced Lennox to leave Scotland. On 19 September 1582, during James's imprisonment, John Craig, whom the king had personally appointed royal chaplain in 1579, rebuked him so sharply from the pulpit for having issued a proclamation so offensive to the clergy "that the king wept".

After James escaped from Falkland on 27 June 1583, he assumed increasing control of his kingdom. He pushed through the Black Acts to assert royal authority over the Kirk, and denounced the writings of his former tutor Buchanan. Between 1584 and 1603, he established effective royal government and relative peace among the lords, ably assisted by John Maitland of Thirlestane, who led the government until 1592. An eight-man commission known as the Octavians brought some control over the ruinous state of James's finances in 1596, but it drew opposition from vested interests. It was disbanded within a year after a riot in Edinburgh, which was stoked by anti-Catholicism and led the court to withdraw to Linlithgow temporarily.

One last Scottish attempt against the king's person occurred in August 1600, when James was apparently assaulted by Alexander Ruthven, the younger brother of John Ruthven, Earl of Gowrie at Gowrie House, the seat of the Ruthvens. Ruthven was run through by James's page John Ramsay, and the Earl of Gowrie was killed in the ensuing fracas; there were few surviving witnesses. Given James's history with the Ruthvens and the fact that he owed them a great deal of money, his account of the circumstances was not universally believed.

In 1586, James signed the Treaty of Berwick with England. That and his mother's execution in 1587, which he denounced as a "preposterous and strange procedure", helped clear the way for his succession south of the border. (Note: James briefly broke off diplomatic relations with England over Mary's execution, but he wrote privately that Scotland "could never have been without factions if she had beene left alive".) Queen Elizabeth was unmarried and childless, and James was her most likely successor. Securing the English succession became a cornerstone of his policy. During the Spanish Armada crisis of 1588, he assured Elizabeth of his support as "your natural son and compatriot of your country". Elizabeth sent James an annual subsidy from 1586 which gave her some leverage over affairs in Scotland, and over the coming years James received in total £58,500 sterling. The money came to be managed by Thomas Foulis and Robert Jousie and a significant proportion was spent on fabrics for royal wardrobe.

=== Marriage ===
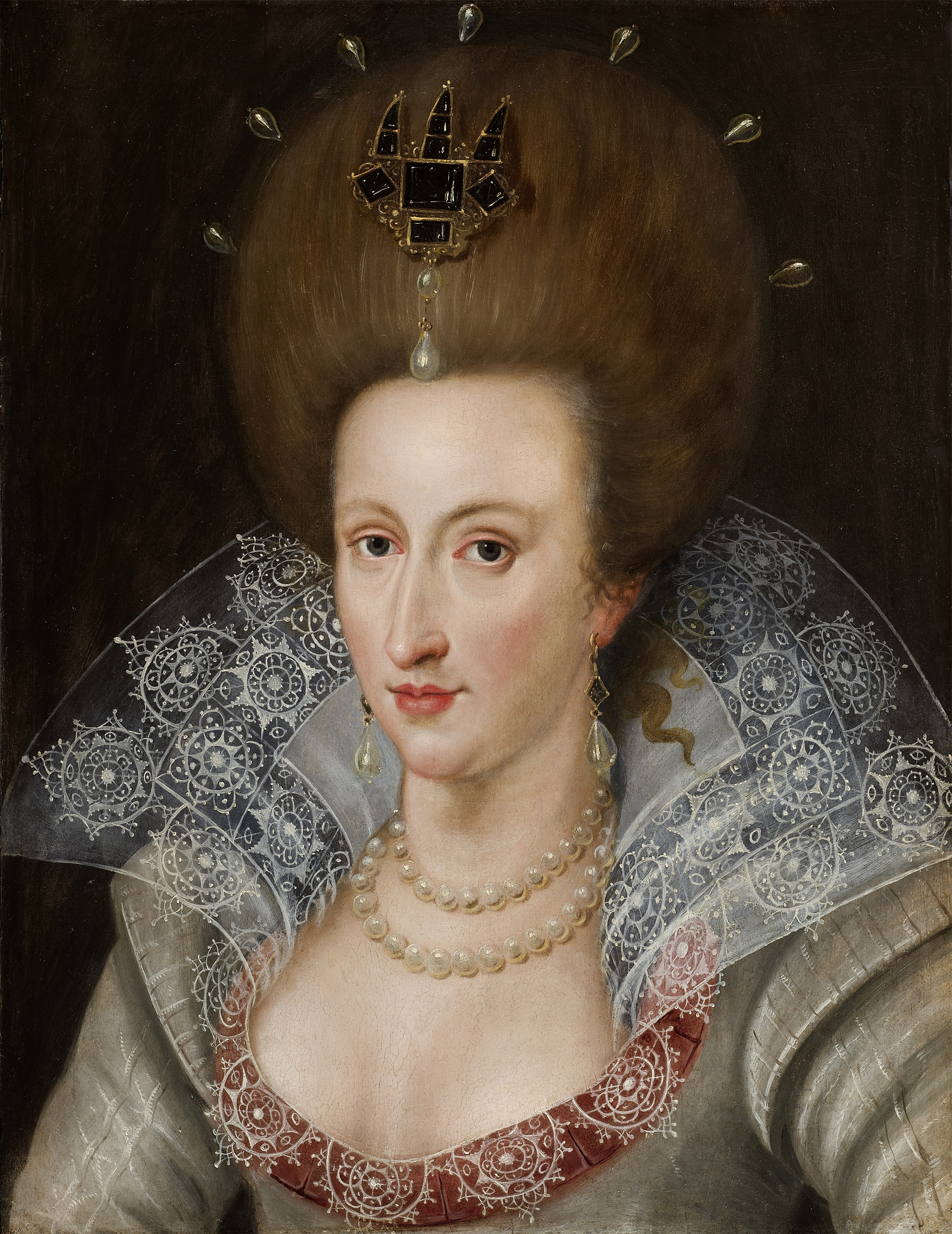
Queen Anne c. 1605, portrait attributed to John de Critz

Throughout his youth, James was praised for his chastity, since he showed little interest in women. After the loss of Lennox, he continued to prefer male company. A suitable marriage, however, was necessary to reinforce his rule, and the choice fell on fourteen-year-old Anne of Denmark, younger daughter of the Protestant Danish king Frederick II. Shortly after a proxy marriage in Copenhagen in August 1589, Anne sailed for Scotland but was forced by storms to the coast of Norway. On hearing that the crossing had been abandoned, James sailed from Leith with a 300-strong retinue to fetch Anne personally in what historian David Harris Willson called "the one romantic episode of his life". (Note: James heard on 7 October of the decision to postpone the crossing for winter.) This event led to a mutual acquaintanceship between James and the future king of Denmark, Christian IV, which would be strengthened between the kings after Christian IV visited London twice. Anne and James were married formally at the Bishop's Palace in Oslo on 23 November. James received a dowry of 75,000 Danish dalers and a gift of 10,000 dalers from his mother-in-law, Sophie of Mecklenburg-Güstrow. After stays at Elsinore and Copenhagen and a meeting with Tycho Brahe, James and Anne returned to Scotland on 1 May 1590.

By all accounts, James was at first infatuated with Anne and, in the early years of their marriage, seems always to have shown her patience and affection. They attended the wedding celebrations of courtiers and danced in masque costume. The royal couple produced three children who survived to adulthood: Henry Frederick, Prince of Wales, who died of typhoid fever in 1612, aged 18; Elizabeth, later queen of Bohemia; and Charles, James's successor. In 1613, two of his diplomats to Scandinavia, scotsmen James Spens and Robert Anstruther, helped mediate a peace between Denmark and Sweden. Anne suffered from recurrent bouts of sickness and was seriously ill from 1617. James visited Anne only three times during her last illness. She died before her husband, in March 1619.

=== Witch hunts ===
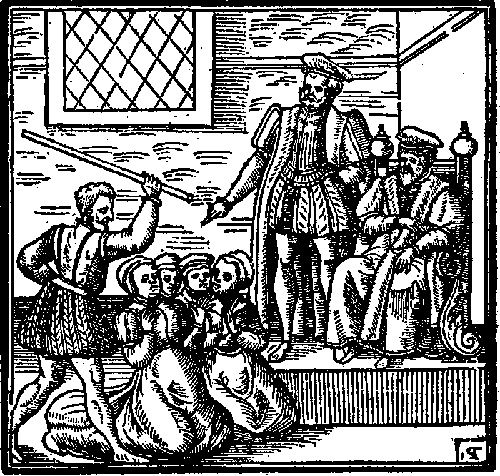
Suspected witches kneeling before King James; Daemonologie (1597)

James's visit to Denmark, a country familiar with witch-hunts, sparked an interest in the study of witchcraft, which he considered a branch of theology. He attended the North Berwick witch trials, the first major persecution of witches in Scotland under the Witchcraft Act 1563. Several people were convicted of using witchcraft to send storms against James's ship, most notably Agnes Sampson.

James became concerned with the threat posed by witches and wrote Daemonologie in 1597, a tract inspired by his personal involvement that opposed the practice of witchcraft and that provided background material for Shakespeare's Macbeth. James personally supervised the torture of women accused of being witches. After 1599, his views became more sceptical. In a later letter written in England to his son Henry, James congratulates the prince on "the discovery of yon little counterfeit wench. I pray God ye may be my heir in such discoveries ... most miracles now-a-days prove but illusions, and ye may see by this how wary judges should be in trusting accusations."

=== Highlands and Islands ===
The forcible dissolution of the Lordship of the Isles by James IV of Scotland in 1493 had led to troubled times for the western seaboard. James IV had subdued the organised military might of the Hebrides, but he and his immediate successors lacked the will or ability to provide an alternative form of governance. As a result, the 16th century became known as linn nan creach, the time of raids. Furthermore, the effects of the Reformation were slow to affect the Gàidhealtachd, driving a religious wedge between this area and centres of political control in the Central Belt.

In 1540, James V had toured the Hebrides, forcing the clan chiefs to accompany him. There followed a period of peace, but the clans were soon at loggerheads with one another again. During James VI's reign, the citizens of the Hebrides were portrayed as lawless barbarians rather than being the cradle of Scottish Christianity and nationhood. Official documents describe the peoples of the Highlands as "void of the knawledge and feir of God" who were prone to "all kynd of barbarous and bestile cruelteis". The Gaelic language, spoken fluently by James IV and probably by James V, became known in the time of James VI as "Erse" or Irish, implying that it was foreign in nature. Parliament decided that Gaelic had become a principal cause of the Highlanders' shortcomings and sought to abolish it.

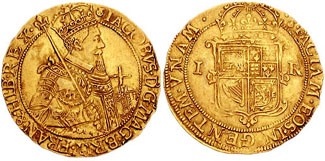
Scottish gold coin from 1609 to 1625

It was against this background that James VI authorised the "Gentleman Adventurers of Fife" to civilise the "most barbarous Isle of Lewis" in 1598. James wrote that the colonists were to act "not by agreement" with the local inhabitants, but "by extirpation of thame". Their landing at Stornoway began well, but the colonists were driven out by local forces commanded by Murdoch and Neil MacLeod. The colonists tried again in 1605 with the same result, although a third attempt in 1607 was more successful. The Statutes of Iona were enacted in 1609, which required clan chiefs to provide support for Protestant ministers to Highland parishes; to outlaw bards; to report regularly to Edinburgh to answer for their actions; and to send their heirs to Lowland Scotland, to be educated in English-speaking Protestant schools. So began a process "specifically aimed at the extirpation of the Gaelic language, the destruction of its traditional culture and the suppression of its bearers."

In the Northern Isles, James's cousin Patrick Stewart, Earl of Orkney, resisted the Statutes of Iona and was consequently imprisoned. His natural son Robert led an unsuccessful rebellion against James, and the Earl and his son were hanged. Their estates were forfeited, and the Orkney and Shetland islands were annexed to the Crown.

=== Theory of monarchy ===
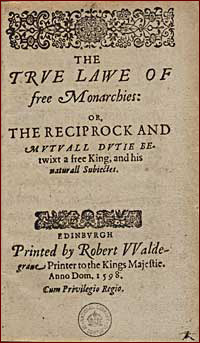
James argued a theological basis for monarchy in The True Law of Free Monarchies.

In 1597–98, James wrote The True Law of Free Monarchies and Basilikon Doron (Royal Gift), in which he argues a theological basis for monarchy. In the True Law, he sets out the divine right of kings, explaining that kings are higher beings than other men for Biblical reasons, though "the highest bench is the sliddriest to sit upon". The document proposes an absolutist theory of monarchy, by which a king may impose new laws by royal prerogative but must also pay heed to tradition and to God, who would "stirre up such scourges as pleaseth him, for punishment of wicked kings".

Basilikon Doron was written as a book of instruction for the four-year-old Prince Henry and provides a more practical guide to kingship. The work is considered to be well written and perhaps the best example of James's prose. James's advice concerning parliaments, which he understood as merely the king's "head court", foreshadows his difficulties with the English House of Commons: "Hold no Parliaments," he tells Henry, "but for the necesitie of new Lawes, which would be but seldome". In the True Law, James maintains that the king owns his realm as a feudal lord owns his fief, because kings arose "before any estates or ranks of men, before any parliaments were holden, or laws made, and by them was the land distributed, which at first was wholly theirs. And so it follows of necessity that kings were the authors and makers of the laws, and not the laws of the kings."

=== Patronage of literature and drama ===
In the 1580s and 1590s, James promoted the literature of his native country. He published his treatise Some Rules and Cautions to be Observed and Eschewed in Scottish Prosody in 1584 at the age of 18. It was both a poetic manual and a description of the poetic tradition in his mother tongue of Scots, applying Renaissance principles. He also made statutory provision to reform and promote the teaching of music, seeing the two in connection. One act of his reign urges the Scottish burghs to reform and support the teaching of music in Sang Sculis.

In furtherance of these aims, James was both patron and head of a loose circle of Scottish Jacobean court poets and musicians known to later critics as the Castalian Band, a group including William Fowler and Alexander Montgomerie among others, Montgomerie being a favourite of the king. James was himself a poet, and was happy to be seen as a practising member of the group.

By the late 1590s, James's championing of native Scottish tradition was reduced to some extent by the increasing likelihood of his succession to the English throne. William Alexander and other courtier poets started to anglicise their written language, and followed the king to London after 1603. James's role as active literary participant and patron made him a defining figure in many respects for English Renaissance poetry and drama, which reached a pinnacle of achievement in his reign, but his patronage of the high style in the Scottish tradition, which included his ancestor James I of Scotland, became largely sidelined.

In 1599 James gave a strong signal of his support for drama, overruling the opposition of the Reformed Kirk in insisting that a playhouse be provided off the High Street in Edinburgh for a company of English players.

== Accession in England ==
The Union of the Crowns was symbolised in James's personal royal heraldic badge after 1603, the Tudor rose dimidiated with the Scottish thistle ensigned by the royal crown.

From 1601, in the last years of Elizabeth's life, certain English politicians—notably her chief minister Robert Cecil (Note: James described Cecil as "king there in effect".)—maintained a secret correspondence with James to prepare in advance for a smooth succession. With the queen clearly dying, Cecil sent James a draft proclamation of his accession to the English throne in March 1603. Elizabeth died in the early hours of 24 March, and James was proclaimed king in London later the same day.

On 5 April, James left Edinburgh for London, promising to return every three years (a promise that he did not keep), and progressed slowly southwards. Local lords received him with lavish hospitality along the route and James was amazed by the wealth of his new land and subjects, claiming that he was "swapping a stony couch for a deep feather bed". James arrived in the capital on 7 May, nine days after Elizabeth's funeral. His new subjects flocked to see him, relieved that the succession had triggered neither unrest nor invasion. On arrival at London, he was mobbed by a crowd of spectators.

James's English coronation took place on 25 July 1603 at Westminster Abbey. An outbreak of plague restricted festivities. The Royal Entry to London with elaborate allegories provided by dramatic poets such as Thomas Dekker and Ben Jonson was deferred to 15 March 1604. Dekker wrote that "the streets seemed to be paved with men; stalls instead of rich wares were set out with children; open casements filled up with women".

The kingdom to which James succeeded, however, had its problems. Monopolies and taxation had engendered a widespread sense of grievance, and the costs of war in Ireland had become a heavy burden on the government, which had debts of £400,000.

== Early reign in England, King of Great Britain ==
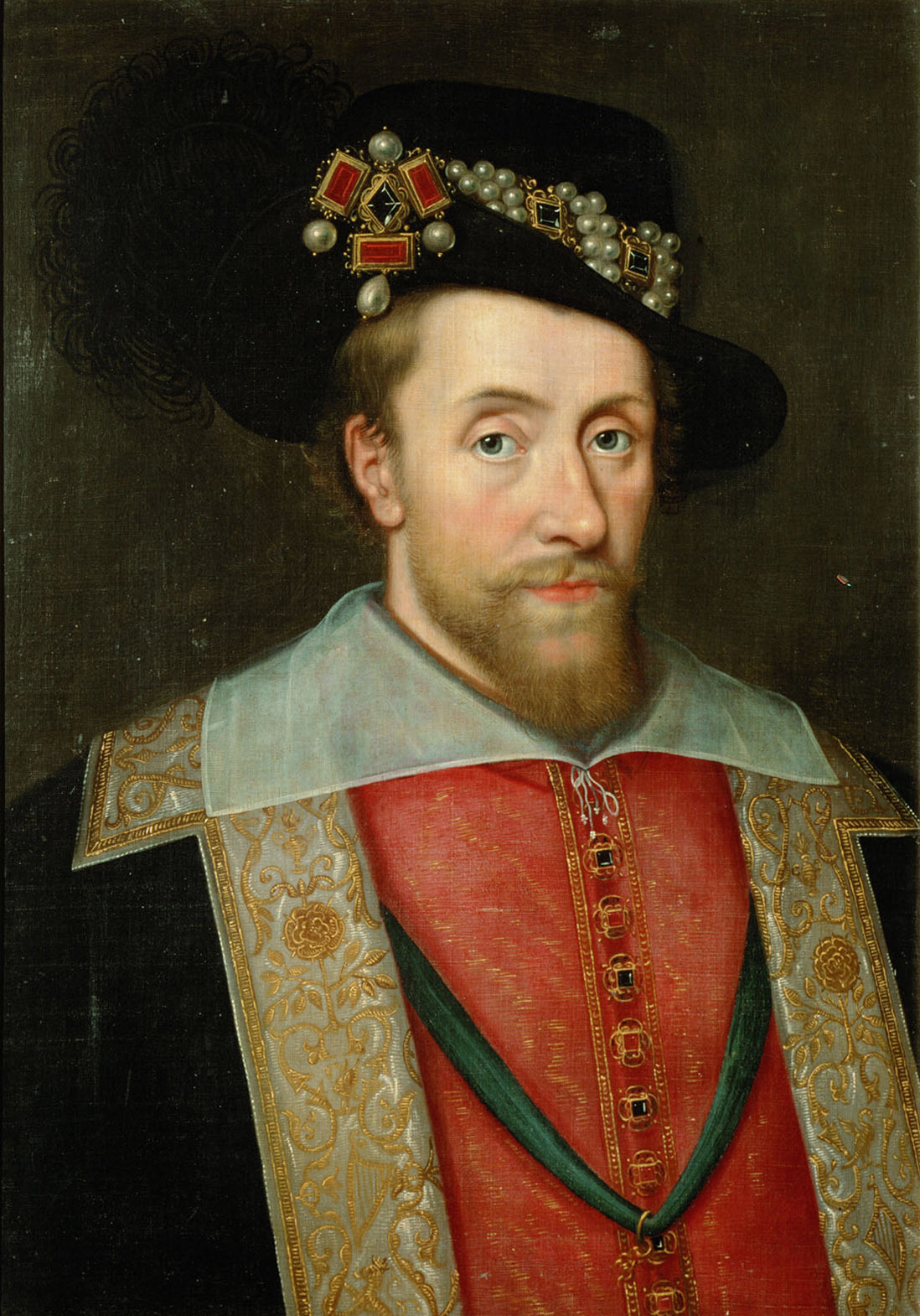
Portrait after John de Critz, c. 1605. James wears the Three Brothers jewel, three rectangular red spinels; the jewel is now lost.

James survived two conspiracies in the first year of his reign in England, despite the apparent smoothness of the succession and the warmth of his welcome: the Bye Plot and Main Plot, which led to the arrest of Henry Brooke, Lord Cobham and Walter Raleigh, among others. Those hoping for a change in government from James were disappointed at first when he kept Elizabeth's Privy Councillors in office, as secretly planned with Cecil, but James soon added long-time supporter Henry Howard and his nephew Thomas Howard to the Privy Council, as well as five Scottish nobles. (Note: The introduction of Henry Howard (soon Earl of Northampton) and of Thomas Howard (soon Earl of Suffolk) marked the beginning of the rise of the Howard family to power in England, which culminated in their dominance of James's government after the death of Cecil in 1612. Henry Howard, son of poet Henry Howard, Earl of Surrey, had been a diligent correspondent with James in advance of the succession (James referred to him as "long approved and trusted Howard"). His connection with James may have owed something to the attempt by his brother Thomas Howard, Duke of Norfolk, to free and marry Mary, Queen of Scots, leading to his execution in 1572. For details on the Howards, see The Trials of Frances Howard by David Lindley. Henry Howard is a traditionally reviled figure (Willson [1956] called him "A man of dark counsels and creeping schemes, learned but bombastic, and a most fulsome flatterer") whose reputation was upgraded by Linda Levy Peck's 1982 biography Northampton.)

In the early years of James's reign, the day-to-day running of the government in England was tightly managed by the shrewd Cecil, later Earl of Salisbury, ably assisted by the experienced Thomas Egerton, whom James made Baron Ellesmere and Lord Chancellor, and by Thomas Sackville, soon Earl of Dorset, who continued as Lord Treasurer. As a consequence, James was free to concentrate on bigger issues, such as a scheme for a closer union between England and Scotland and matters of foreign policy, as well as to enjoy his leisure pursuits, particularly hunting.

James was ambitious to build on the personal union of Scotland and England to establish a single country under one monarch, one parliament, and one law, a plan that met opposition from both the Parliament of England and the Parliament of Scotland. "Hath He not made us all in one island," James told the English Parliament, "compassed with one sea and of itself by nature indivisible?" In April 1604, however, the Commons refused his request to be titled "King of Great Britain" on legal grounds. (Note: English and Scot, James insisted, should "join and coalesce together in a sincere and perfect union, as two twins bred in one belly, to love one another as no more two but one estate".) In October 1604, he assumed the title "King of Great Britain" instead of "King of England" and "King of Scotland", though Francis Bacon told him that he could not use the style in "any legal proceeding, instrument or assurance" and the title was not used on English statutes. James forced the Scottish Parliament to use it, and it was used on proclamations, coinage, letters, and treaties in both realms.

James achieved more success in foreign policy. Never having been at war with Spain, he devoted his efforts to bringing the long Anglo–Spanish War to an end, and a peace treaty was signed between the two countries in August 1604, thanks to the skilled diplomacy of the delegation, in particular Robert Cecil and Henry Howard, now Earl of Northampton. James celebrated the treaty by hosting a great banquet. Freedom of worship for Catholics in England, however, continued to be a major objective of Spanish policy, causing constant dilemmas for James, distrusted abroad for repression of Catholics while at home being encouraged by the Privy Council to show even less tolerance towards them.

=== Gunpowder Plot ===
A dissident Catholic, Guy Fawkes, was discovered in the cellars of the parliament buildings on the night of 4–5 November 1605, the eve of the state opening of the second session of James's first English Parliament. Fawkes was guarding a pile of wood not far from 36 barrels of gunpowder with which he intended to blow up Parliament House the following day and cause the destruction, as James put it, "not only ... of my person, nor of my wife and posterity also, but of the whole body of the State in general". The sensational discovery of the "Gunpowder Plot", as it quickly became known, aroused a mood of national relief at the saving of the king and his sons. The Earl of Salisbury exploited this to extract higher subsidies from the ensuing Parliament than any but one granted to Elizabeth. Fawkes and others implicated in the unsuccessful conspiracy were executed.

== King and Parliament ==
The co-operation between monarch and Parliament following the Gunpowder Plot was atypical. Instead, it was the previous session of 1604 that shaped the attitudes of both sides for the rest of the reign, though the initial difficulties owed more to mutual incomprehension than conscious enmity. On 7 July 1604, James had angrily prorogued Parliament after failing to win its support either for full union or financial subsidies. "I will not thank where I feel no thanks due", he had remarked in his closing speech. "... I am not of such a stock as to praise fools ... You see how many things you did not well ... I wish you would make use of your liberty with more modesty in time to come".

As James's reign progressed, his government faced growing financial pressures, partly due to creeping inflation but also to the profligacy and financial incompetence of James's court. In February 1610, Salisbury proposed a scheme, known as the Great Contract, whereby Parliament, in return for ten royal concessions, would grant a lump sum of £600,000 to pay off the king's debts plus an annual grant of £200,000. The ensuing prickly negotiations became so protracted that James eventually lost patience and dismissed Parliament on 31 December 1610. "Your greatest error", he told Salisbury, "hath been that ye ever expected to draw honey out of gall". The same pattern was repeated with the so-called "Addled Parliament" of 1614, which James dissolved after a mere nine weeks when the Commons hesitated to grant him the money he required. James then ruled without parliament until 1621, employing officials such as the merchant Lionel Cranfield, who were astute at raising and saving money for the crown, and sold baronetcies and other dignities, many created for the purpose, as an alternative source of income.

=== Spanish match ===
Another potential source of income was the prospect of a Spanish dowry from a marriage between Charles, Prince of Wales, and Infanta Maria Anna of Spain. The policy of the Spanish match, as it was called, was also attractive to James as a way to maintain peace with Spain and avoid the additional costs of a war. Peace could be maintained as effectively by keeping the negotiations alive as by consummating the match—which may explain why James protracted the negotiations for almost a decade.

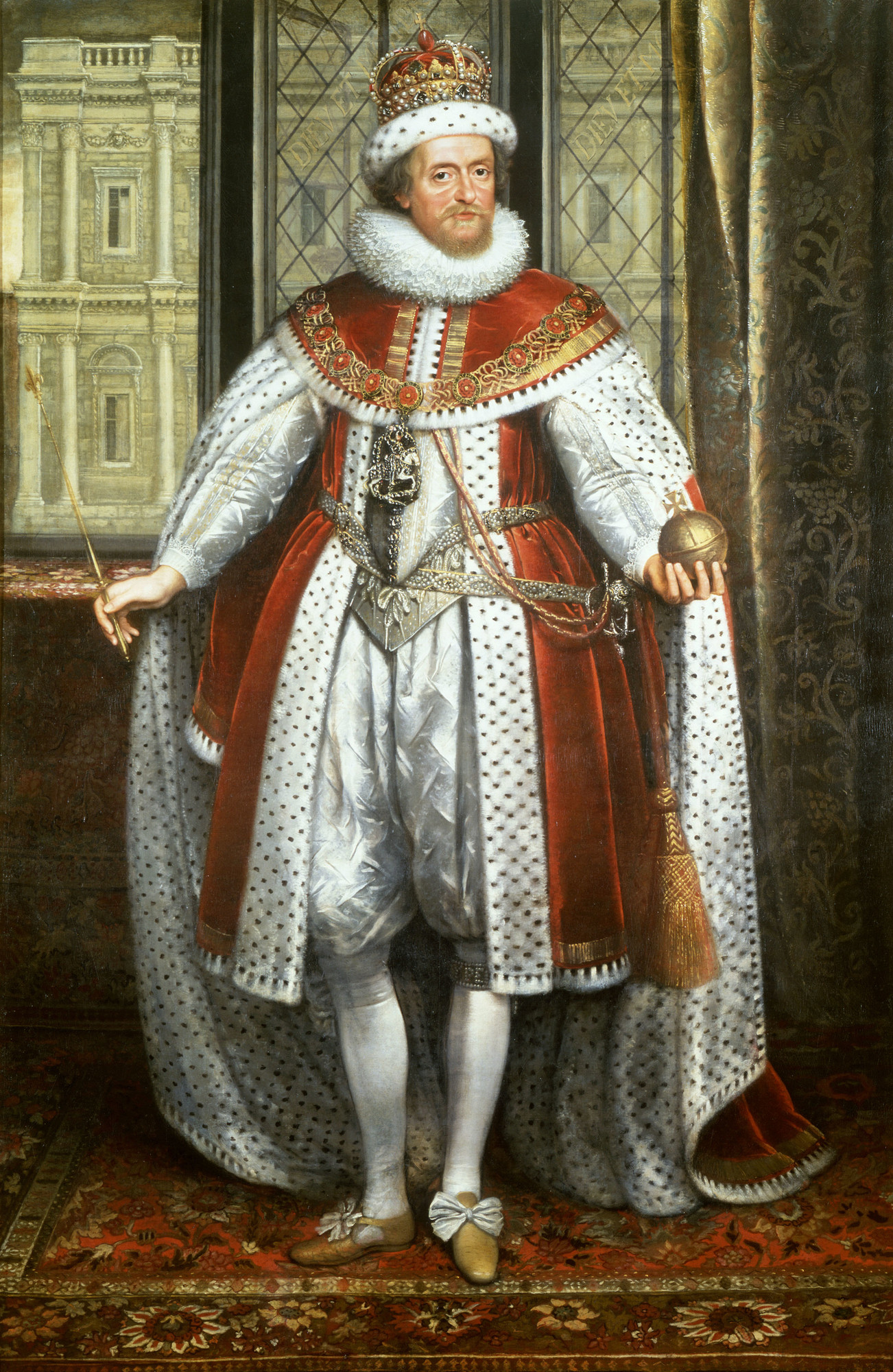
Portrait by Paul van Somer, c. 1620. In the background is the Banqueting House, Whitehall, by architect Inigo Jones, commissioned by James.

The policy was supported by the Howards and other Catholic-leaning ministers and diplomats—together known as the Spanish Party—but deeply distrusted in Protestant England. When Walter Raleigh was released from imprisonment in 1616, he embarked on a hunt for gold in South America with strict instructions from James not to engage the Spanish. Raleigh's expedition was a disastrous failure, and his son Walter was killed fighting the Spanish. On Raleigh's return to England, James had him executed to the indignation of the public, who opposed the appeasement of Spain. James's policy was further jeopardised by the outbreak of the Thirty Years' War, especially after his Protestant son-in-law, Frederick V, Elector Palatine, was ousted from Bohemia by the Catholic Emperor Ferdinand II in 1620, and Spanish troops simultaneously invaded Frederick's Rhineland territory. Matters came to a head when James finally called a Parliament in 1621 to fund a military expedition in support of his son-in-law. The Commons on the one hand granted subsidies inadequate to finance serious military operations in aid of Frederick, and on the other—remembering the profits gained under Elizabeth by naval attacks on Spanish gold shipments—called for a war directly against Spain. In November 1621, roused by Edward Coke, they framed a petition asking not only for war with Spain but also for Prince Charles to marry a Protestant, and for enforcement of the anti-Catholic laws. James flatly told them not to interfere in matters of royal prerogative or they would risk punishment, which provoked them into issuing a statement protesting their rights, including freedom of speech. Urged on by George Villiers, Duke of Buckingham, and the Spanish ambassador Diego Sarmiento de Acuña, Count of Gondomar, James ripped the protest out of the record book and dissolved Parliament.

In early 1623, Prince Charles, now 22, and Buckingham decided to seize the initiative and travel to Spain incognito, to win Infanta Maria Anna directly, but the mission proved an ineffectual mistake. Maria Anna detested Charles, and the Spanish confronted them with terms that included the repeal of anti-Catholic legislation by Parliament. Though a treaty was signed, Charles and Buckingham returned to England in October without the infanta and immediately renounced the treaty, much to the delight of the British people. Disillusioned by the visit to Spain, Charles and Buckingham now turned James's Spanish policy upon its head and called for a French match and a war against the Habsburg empire. To raise the necessary finance, they prevailed upon James to call another Parliament, which met in February 1624. For once, the outpouring of anti-Catholic sentiment in the Commons was echoed in court, where control of policy was shifting from James to Charles and Buckingham, who pressured the King to declare war and engineered the impeachment of Lord Treasurer Cranfield, by now made Earl of Middlesex, when he opposed the plan on grounds of cost. The outcome of the Parliament of 1624 was ambiguous: James still refused to declare or fund a war, but Charles believed the Commons had committed themselves to finance a war against Spain, a stance that was to contribute to his problems with Parliament in his own reign.

== King and Church ==
After the Gunpowder Plot, James sanctioned harsh measures to control English Catholics. In May 1606, Parliament passed the Popish Recusants Act, which could require any subject to take an Oath of Allegiance denying the pope's authority over the king. James was conciliatory towards Catholics who took the Oath of Allegiance, and tolerated crypto-Catholicism even at court. (Note: A crypto-Catholic was someone who outwardly conformed to Protestantism but remained a Catholic in private.) Henry Howard, for example, was a crypto-Catholic, received back into the Catholic Church in his final months. On ascending the English throne, James suspected that he might need the support of Catholics in England, so he assured Henry Percy, 9th Earl of Northumberland, a prominent sympathiser of the old religion, that he would not persecute "any that will be quiet and give but an outward obedience to the law".

In the Millenary Petition of 1603, the Puritan clergy demanded the abolition of confirmation, wedding rings, and the term "priest", among other things, and that the wearing of cap and surplice become optional. James was strict in enforcing conformity at first, inducing a sense of persecution amongst many Puritans; but ejections and suspensions from livings became rarer as the reign continued. As a result of the Hampton Court Conference of 1604, some Puritan demands were acceded to in the 1604 Book of Common Prayer, though many remained displeased. The conference also commissioned a new translation and compilation of approved books of the Bible to resolve discrepancies among different translations then being used. The King James Version, as it came to be known, was completed in 1611 and is considered a masterpiece of Jacobean prose. It is still in widespread use.

In Scotland, James attempted to bring the Scottish Kirk "so neir as can be" to the English church and to reestablish episcopacy, a policy that met with strong opposition from presbyterians. (Note: In March 1605, Archbishop Spottiswood wrote to James warning him that sermons against bishops were being preached daily in Edinburgh.) James returned to Scotland in 1617 for the only time after his accession in England, in the hope of implementing Anglican ritual. James's bishops forced his Five Articles of Perth through a General Assembly the following year, but the rulings were widely resisted. James left the church in Scotland divided at his death, a source of future problems for his son. (Note: Assessments of the Kirk at James's death are divided. Some historians argue that the Scots might have accepted James's policies eventually, others that James left the Kirk in crisis.)

== Personal relationships ==
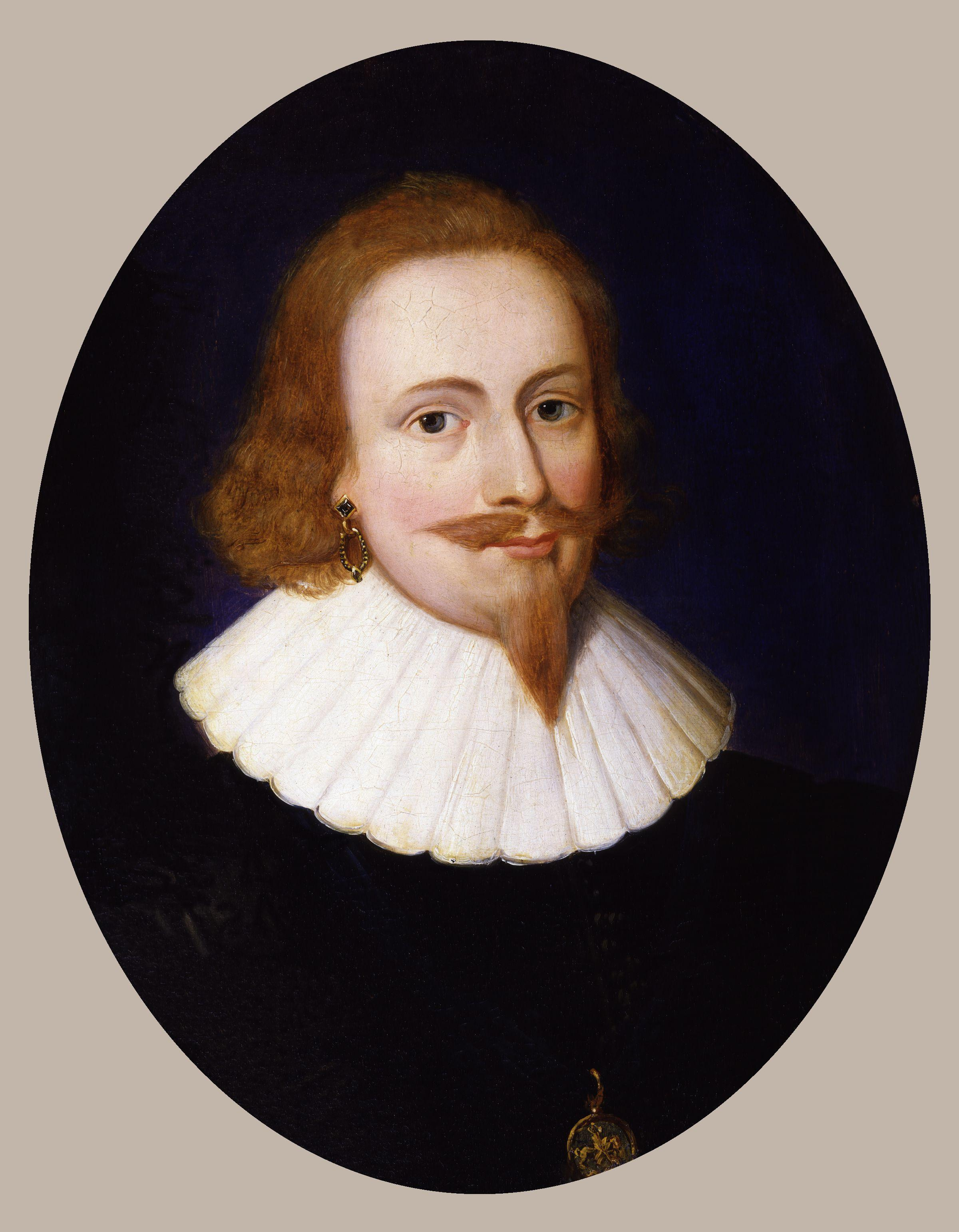
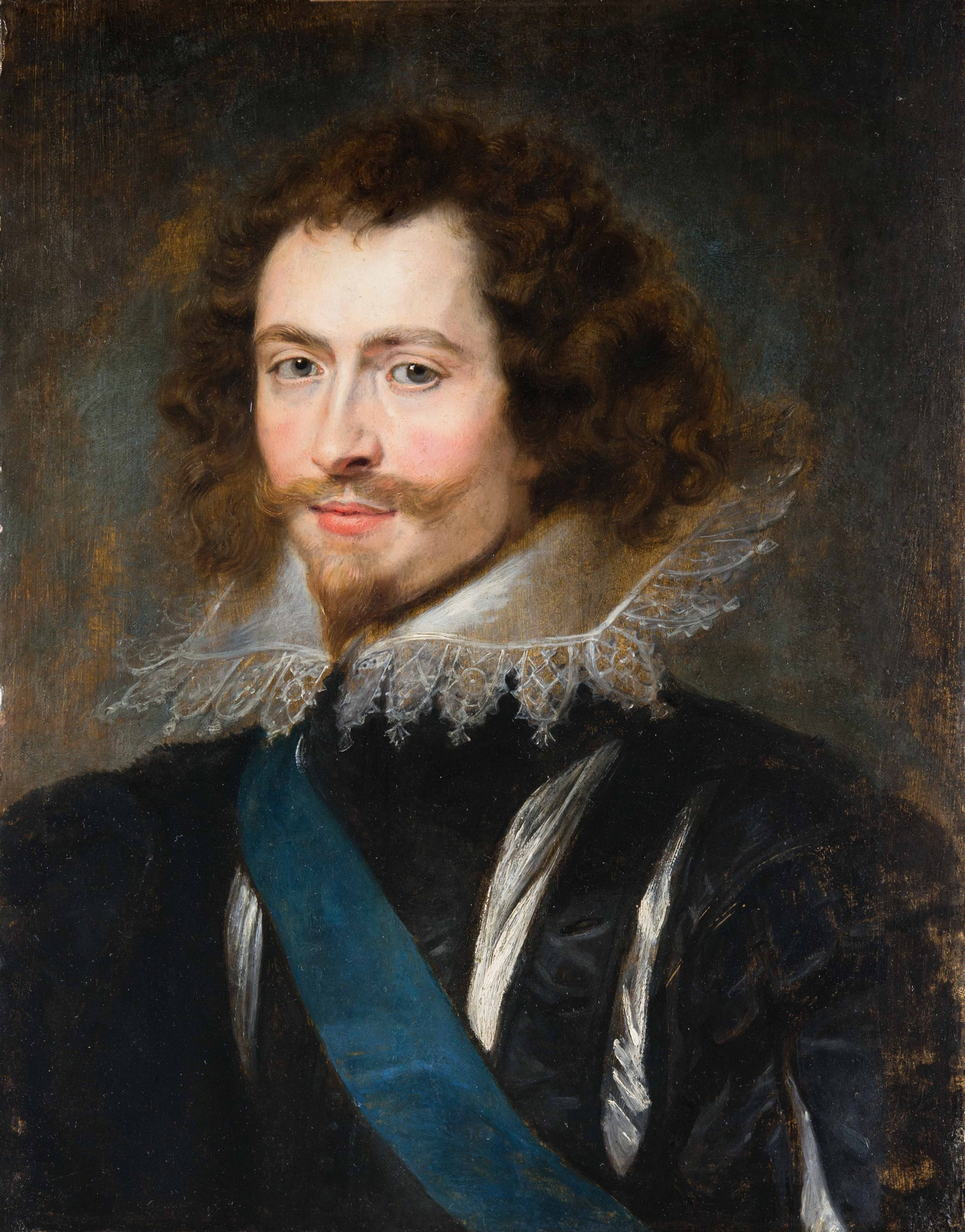
Robert Carr, 1st Earl of Somerset (left), and George Villiers, 1st Duke of Buckingham, are both said to have been James's lovers.

Throughout his life James had close relationships with male courtiers, which has caused debate among historians about their exact nature. In Scotland, Anne Murray was known as the king's mistress. After his accession in England, his peaceful and scholarly attitude contrasted strikingly with the bellicose and flirtatious behaviour of Elizabeth, as indicated by the contemporary epigram Rex fuit Elizabeth, nunc est regina Iacobus (Elizabeth was King, now James is Queen).

Some of James's biographers conclude that Esmé Stewart, 1st Duke of Lennox; Robert Carr, 1st Earl of Somerset; and George Villiers, 1st Duke of Buckingham, were his lovers. John Oglander observed that he "never yet saw any fond husband make so much or so great dalliance over his beautiful spouse as I have seen King James over his favourites, especially the Duke of Buckingham" whom the king would, recalled Sir Edward Peyton, "tumble and kiss as a mistress". A modern restoration of Apethorpe Hall in Northamptonshire, undertaken from 2004 to 2008, revealed a previously unknown passage linking what were the bedchambers of James and Villiers.

Some biographers of James argue that the relationships were not sexual. James's Basilikon Doron lists sodomy among crimes "ye are bound in conscience never to forgive", and James's wife Anne gave birth to seven live children, as well as suffering two stillbirths and at least three other miscarriages. Contemporary Huguenot poet Théophile de Viau observed that "it is well known that the king of England / fucks the Duke of Buckingham". (Note: In the original: Et ce savant roy d'Angleterre / foutoit-il pas le Boukinquan.) Buckingham himself provides evidence that he slept in the same bed as the king, writing to James many years later that he had pondered "whether you loved me now ... better than at the time which I shall never forget at Farnham, where the bed's head could not be found between the master and his dog". Buckingham's words may be interpreted as non-sexual, in the context of 17th-century court life, and remain ambiguous despite their fondness. It is also possible that James was bisexual.

When the Earl of Salisbury died in 1612, he was little mourned by those who jostled to fill the power vacuum. (Note: Northampton assumed the day-to-day running of government business, and spoke of "the death of the little man for which so many rejoice and few do as much as seem to be sorry.") Until Salisbury's death, the Elizabethan administrative system over which he had presided continued to function with relative efficiency; from this time forward, however, James's government entered a period of decline and disrepute. Salisbury's passing gave James the notion of governing in person as his own chief Minister of State, with his young Scottish favourite Robert Carr carrying out many of Salisbury's former duties, but James's inability to attend closely to official business exposed the government to factionalism.

The Howard party (consisting of Henry Howard, Earl of Northampton; Thomas Howard, Earl of Suffolk; Suffolk's son-in-law William Knollys, Lord Knollys; Charles Howard, Earl of Nottingham; and Thomas Lake) soon took control of much of the government and its patronage. Even the powerful Carr fell into the Howard camp, hardly experienced for the responsibilities thrust upon him and often dependent on his intimate friend Thomas Overbury for assistance with government papers. Carr had an adulterous affair with Frances Howard, Countess of Essex, daughter of the Earl of Suffolk. James assisted Frances by securing an annulment of her marriage to free her to marry Carr, now Earl of Somerset. (Note: The commissioners judging the case reached a 5–5 verdict, so James quickly appointed two extra judges guaranteed to vote in favour, an intervention which aroused public censure. When Thomas Bilson (son of Bishop Bilson of Winchester, one of the added commissioners) was knighted after the annulment, he was given the nickname "Sir Nullity Bilson".)

In summer 1615, however, it emerged that Overbury had been poisoned. He had died in September 1613 in the Tower of London, where he had been placed at the king's request. (Note: It is very likely that Overbury was the victim of a 'set-up' contrived by the earls of Northampton and Suffolk, with Carr's complicity, to keep him out of the way during the annulment proceedings. Overbury knew too much of Carr's dealings with Frances and he opposed the match with a fervour that made him dangerous, motivated by a deep political hostility to the Howards. It cannot have been difficult to secure James's compliance, because he disliked Overbury and his influence over Carr. John Chamberlain reported that the king "hath long had a desire to remove him from about the lord of Rochester, as thinking it a dishonour to him that the world should have an opinion that Rochester ruled him and Overbury ruled Rochester".) Among those convicted of the murder were the Earl and Countess of Somerset; the Earl had been replaced as the king's favourite in the meantime by Villiers. James pardoned the Countess and commuted the Earl's sentence of death, eventually pardoning him in 1624. The implication of the king in such a scandal provoked much public and literary conjecture and irreparably tarnished James's court with an image of corruption and depravity. The subsequent downfall of the Howards left Villiers unchallenged as the supreme figure in the government by 1619.

== Health and death ==
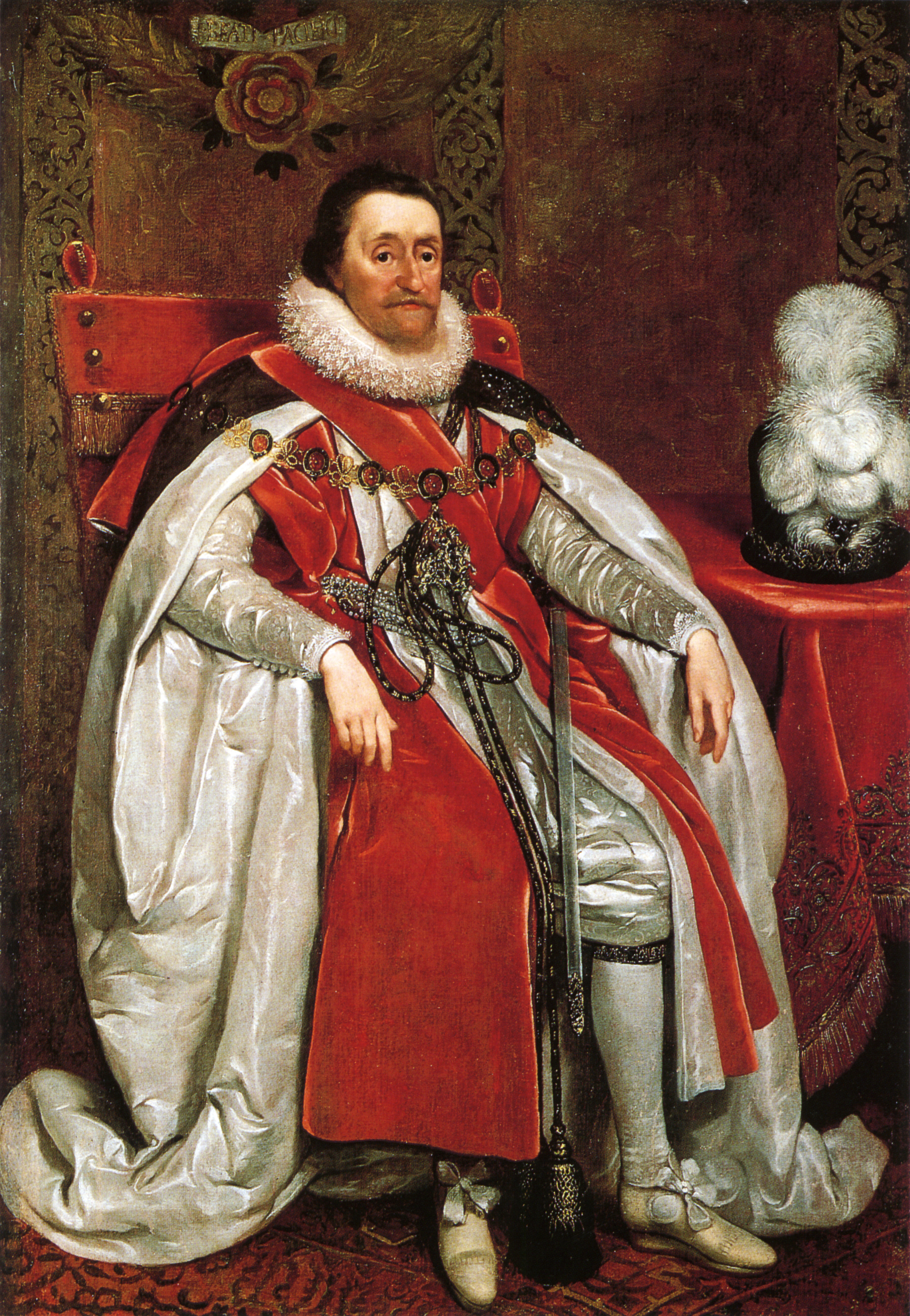
Portrait by Daniël Mijtens, 1621, in the National Portrait Gallery

In his later years, James suffered increasingly from arthritis, gout and kidney stones. He also lost his teeth and drank heavily. The king was often seriously ill during the last year of his life, leaving him an increasingly peripheral figure, rarely able to visit London, while Buckingham consolidated his control of Charles to ensure his own future. (Note: Some historians (for example Willson) consider James, who was 58 in 1624, to have lapsed into premature senility; but he suffered from an agonising species of arthritis which constantly left him indisposed, as well as other ailments; and Pauline Croft suggests that James regained some control over his affairs in summer 1624, afforded relief by the warm weather. She sees his continuing refusal to sanction war against Spain as a deliberate stand against the aggressive policies of Charles and Buckingham.) One theory is that James suffered from porphyria, a disease of which his descendant George III exhibited some symptoms. James described his urine to physician Théodore de Mayerne as being the "dark red colour of Alicante wine". The theory is dismissed by some experts, particularly in James's case, because he had kidney stones which can lead to blood in the urine, colouring it red.

In early 1625, James was plagued by severe attacks of arthritis, gout, and fainting fits, and fell seriously ill in March with tertian ague and then suffered a stroke. He died at Theobalds House in Hertfordshire on 27 March, aged 58, during a violent attack of dysentery, with Buckingham at his bedside. (Note: A medicine recommended by Buckingham had only served to make the king worse, which led to rumours that the duke had poisoned him.) James's funeral on 7 May was a magnificent but disorderly affair. Bishop John Williams of Lincoln preached the sermon, observing, "King Solomon died in Peace, when he had lived about sixty years ... and so you know did King James". The sermon was later printed as Great Britain's Salomon [sic].

James was buried in Westminster Abbey. The position of the tomb was lost for many years until his lead coffin was found in the Henry VII vault, during an excavation in the 19th century.

== Legacy ==
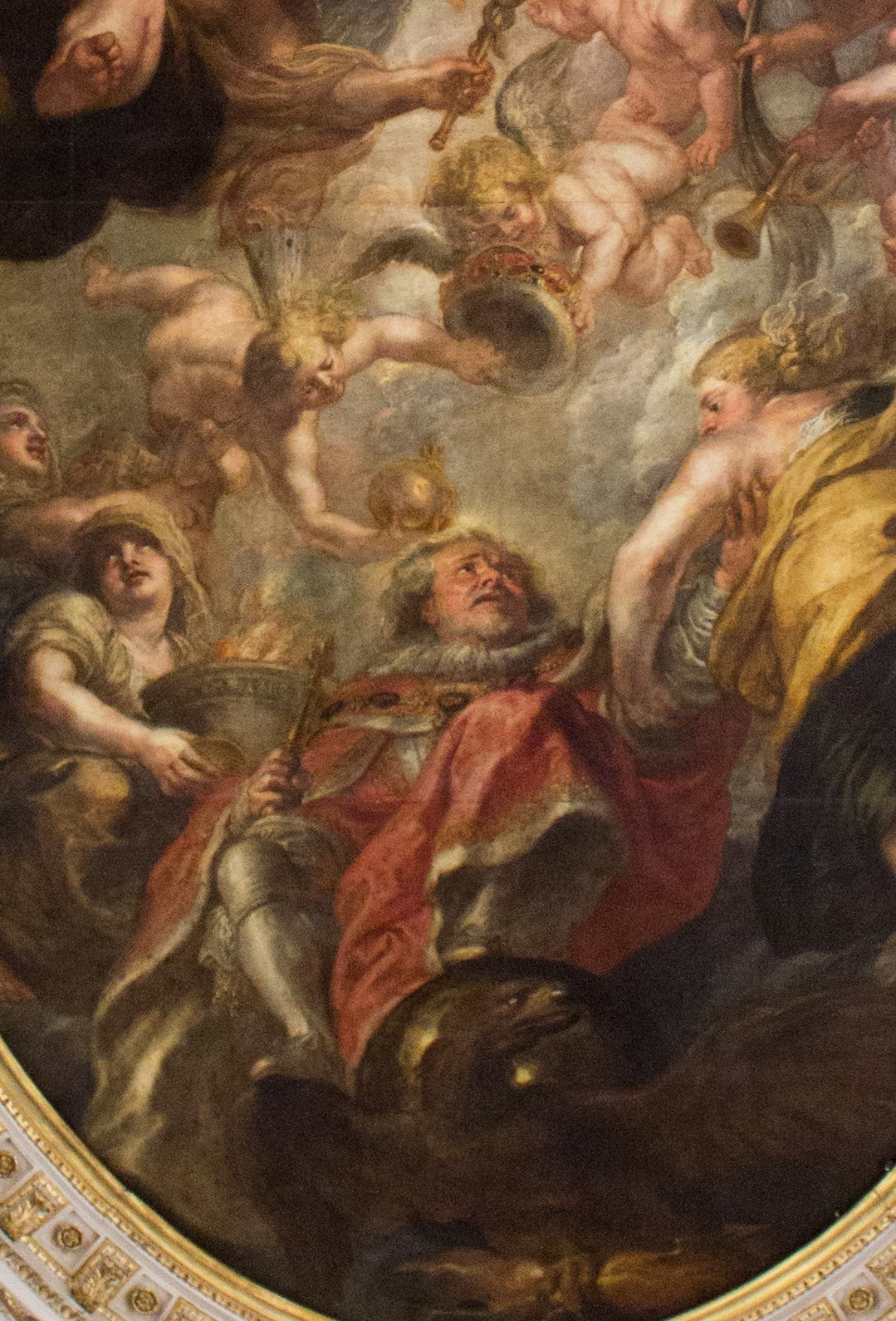
On the ceiling of the Banqueting House, Rubens depicted James being carried to heaven by angels.

James was widely mourned. For all his flaws, he had largely retained the affection of his people, who had enjoyed uninterrupted peace and comparatively low taxation during the Jacobean era. "As he lived in peace", remarked the Earl of Kellie, "so did he die in peace, and I pray God our king [Charles I] may follow him". The Earl prayed in vain: once in power, King Charles I and the Duke of Buckingham sanctioned a series of reckless military expeditions that ended in humiliating failure. James had often neglected the business of government for leisure pastimes, such as the hunt; his later dependence on favourites at a scandal-ridden court undermined the respected image of monarchy so carefully constructed by Elizabeth I.

Under James, the Plantation of Ulster by English and Scots Protestants began, and the English colonisation of North America started its course with the foundation of Jamestown, Virginia, in 1607 and Cuper's Cove, Newfoundland, in 1610. During the next 150 years, England would fight with Spain, the Netherlands, and France for control of the continent, while religious division in Ireland between Protestants and Catholics has lasted for 400 years. By actively pursuing more than just a personal union of his realms, James helped lay the foundations for a unitary British state.

According to a tradition originating with anti-Stuart historians of the mid-17th-century, James's taste for political absolutism, his financial irresponsibility, and his cultivation of unpopular favourites established the foundations of the English Civil War. James bequeathed his son Charles a fatal belief in the divine right of kings, combined with a disdain for Parliament, which culminated in the execution of Charles I and the abolition of the monarchy. Over the last three hundred years, the king's reputation has suffered from the acid description of him by Anthony Weldon, whom James had sacked and who may have written treatises on James in the first half of the 17th century.

Other influential anti-James histories written during the 1650s include: Edward Peyton's Divine Catastrophe of the Kingly Family of the House of Stuarts (1652); Arthur Wilson's History of Great Britain, Being the Life and Reign of King James I (1658); and Francis Osborne's Historical Memoirs of the Reigns of Queen Elizabeth and King James (1658). David Harris Willson's 1956 biography continued much of this hostility. In the words of historian Jenny Wormald, Willson's book was an "astonishing spectacle of a work whose every page proclaimed its author's increasing hatred for his subject". Since Willson, however, the stability of James's government in Scotland and in the early part of his English reign, as well as his relatively enlightened views on religion and war, have earned him a re-evaluation from many historians, who have rescued his reputation from this tradition of criticism. (Note: In recent decades, much scholarship has emphasised James's success in Scotland (though there have been partial dissenters, such as Michael Lynch), and there is an emerging appreciation of James's successes in the early part of his reign in England.)

Representative of the new historical perspective is the 2003 biography by Pauline Croft. Reviewer John Cramsie summarises her findings:

Croft's overall assessment of James is appropriately mixed. She recognises his good intentions in matters like Anglo-Scottish union, his openness to different points of view, and his agenda of a peaceful foreign policy within his kingdoms' financial means. His actions moderated frictions between his diverse peoples. Yet he also created new ones, particularly by supporting colonisation that polarised the crown's interest groups in Ireland, obtaining insufficient political benefit with his open-handed patronage, an unfortunate lack of attention to the image of monarchy (particularly after the image-obsessed regime of Elizabeth), pursuing a pro-Spanish foreign policy that fired religious prejudice and opened the door for Arminians within the English church, and enforcing unpalatable religious changes on the Scottish Kirk. Many of these criticisms are framed within a longer view of James' reigns, including the legacy—now understood to be more troubled—which he left Charles I.

== Titles, styles and arms ==
=== Titles and styles ===
In Scotland, James was "James the sixth, King of Scotland", until 1604. He was proclaimed "James the first, King of England, France, and Ireland, defender of the faith" in London on 24 March 1603. On 20 October 1604, James issued a proclamation at Westminster changing his style to "King of Great Brittaine, France and Ireland, Defender of the Faith, &c." The style was not used on English statutes, but was used on proclamations, coinage, letters, treaties, and in Scotland. James styled himself "King of France", in line with other monarchs of England between 1340 and 1801, although he did not actually rule France.

=== Arms ===
As King of Scotland, James bore the ancient royal arms of Scotland: Or, a lion rampant Gules armed and langued Azure within a double tressure flory counter-flory Gules. The arms were supported by two unicorns Argent armed, crined and unguled Proper, gorged with a coronet Or composed of crosses patée and fleurs de lys a chain affixed thereto passing between the forelegs and reflexed over the back also Or. The crest was a lion sejant affrontée Gules, imperially crowned Or, holding in the dexter paw a sword and in the sinister paw a sceptre both erect and Proper.

The Union of the Crowns of England and Scotland under James was symbolised heraldically by combining their arms, supporters and badges. Contention as to how the arms should be marshalled, and to which kingdom should take precedence, was solved by having different arms for each country.

The arms used in England were: Quarterly, I and IV, quarterly 1st and 4th Azure three fleurs de lys Or (for France), 2nd and 3rd Gules three lions passant guardant in pale Or (for England); II Or a lion rampant within a tressure flory-counter-flory Gules (for Scotland); III Azure a harp Or stringed Argent (for Ireland, this was the first time that Ireland was included in the royal arms). The supporters became: dexter a lion rampant guardant Or imperially crowned and sinister the Scottish unicorn. The unicorn replaced the red dragon introduced by the Tudors. The unicorn has remained in the royal arms of the two united realms. The English crest and motto was retained. The compartment often contained a branch of the Tudor rose, with shamrock and thistle engrafted on the same stem. The arms were frequently shown with James's personal motto, Beati pacifici.

The arms used in Scotland were: Quarterly, I and IV Scotland, II England and France, III Ireland, with Scotland taking precedence over England. The supporters were: dexter a unicorn of Scotland imperially crowned, supporting a tilting lance flying a banner Azure a saltire Argent (Cross of Saint Andrew) and sinister the crowned lion of England supporting a similar lance flying a banner Argent a cross Gules (Cross of Saint George). The Scottish crest and motto was retained, following the Scottish practice the motto In defens (which is short for In My Defens God Me Defend) was placed above the crest.

Coats of arms of James VI and I

Coat of arms used from 1567 to 1603

Coat of arms used from 1603 to 1625 outside Scotland

Coat of arms used from 1603 to 1625 in Scotland

As royal badges James used: the Tudor rose, the thistle (for Scotland; first used by James III of Scotland), the Tudor rose dimidiated with the thistle ensigned with the royal crown, a harp (for Ireland) and a fleur de lys (for France).

== Issue ==
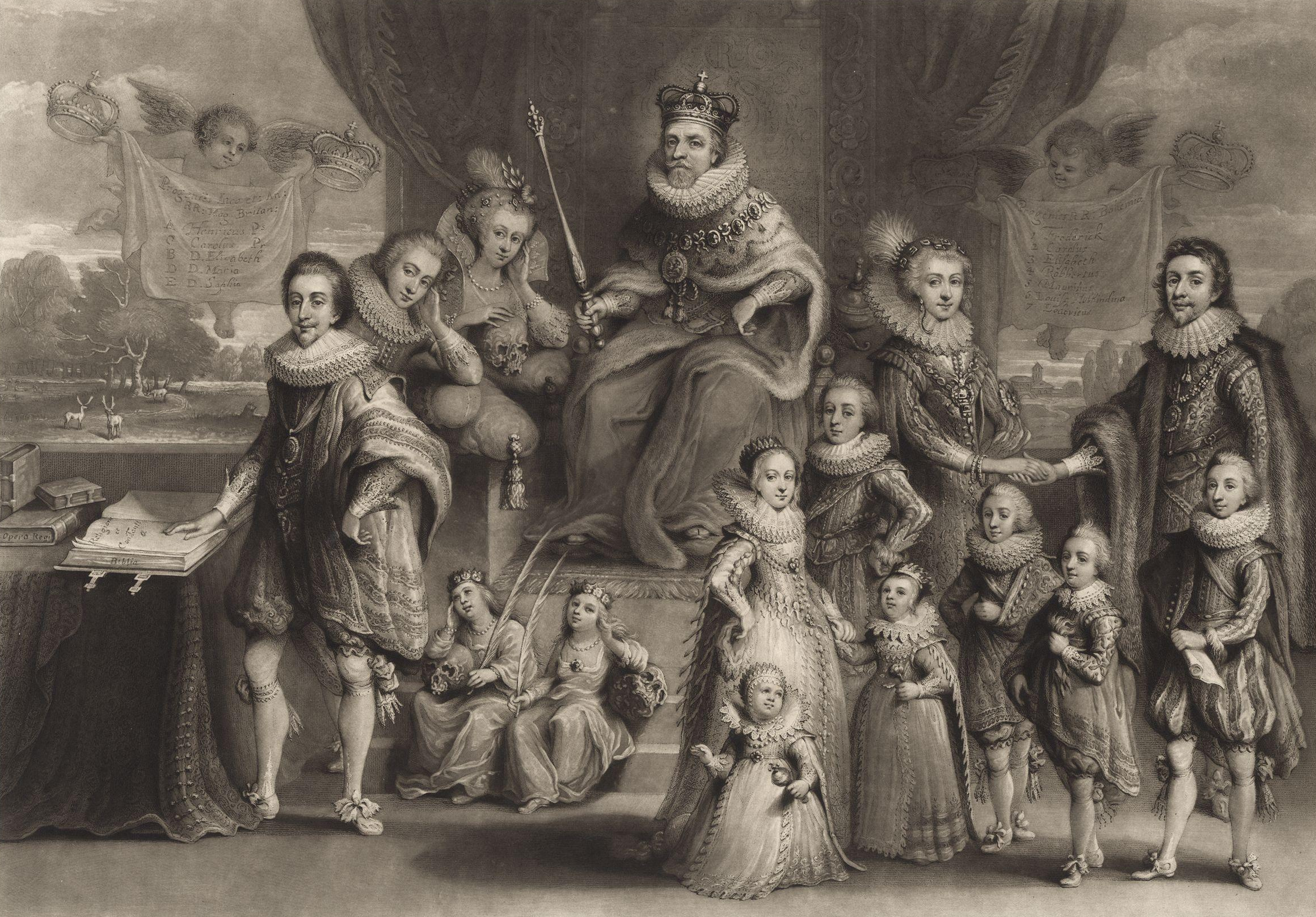
James I and his royal progeny by Charles Turner, from a mezzotint by Samuel Woodburn (1814), after Willem de Passe

James's queen, Anne of Denmark, gave birth to seven children who survived beyond birth, of whom three reached adulthood:

1. Henry Frederick, Prince of Wales (19 February 1594 – 6 November 1612). Died, probably of typhoid fever, aged 18.
2. Elizabeth, Queen of Bohemia (19 August 1596 – 13 February 1662). Married 1613 Frederick V, Elector Palatine. Died aged 65.
3. Margaret (24 December 1598 – March 1600). Died aged 1.
4. Charles I, King of England, Scotland and Ireland (19 November 1600 – beheaded 30 January 1649). Married 1625 Henrietta Maria of France. Succeeded James I & VI.
5. Robert, Duke of Kintyre (18 January 1602 – 27 May 1602). Died aged 4 months.
6. Mary (8 April 1605 – 16 December 1607). Died aged 2.
7. Sophia (June 1606). Died within 48 hours of birth.

== Family tree ==
James's relationship to the houses of Stuart and Tudor

House of Stuart
James II, King of Scots	Mary of Guelders
James III, King of Scots	Mary Stewart
Elizabeth Hamilton
House of Tudor
John Stewart	Henry VII, King of England
James IV, King of Scotland	Margaret Tudor	Archibald Douglas	Henry VIII, King of England
James V, King of Scotland	Matthew Stewart	Margaret Douglas	Mary I, Queen of England	Elizabeth I, Queen of England	Edward VI, King of England
Mary, Queen of Scots	Henry Stuart
James VI & I, King of Scotland and England

== Ancestry ==
Ancestors of James VI and I

8. John Stewart, 3rd Earl of Lennox
4. Matthew Stewart, 4th Earl of Lennox
9. Elizabeth Stewart
2. Henry Stuart, Lord Darnley
10. Archibald Douglas, 6th Earl of Angus
5. Margaret Douglas
11. Margaret Tudor = 13
1. James VI and I
12. James IV of Scotland
6. James V of Scotland
13. Margaret Tudor = 11
3. Mary, Queen of Scots
14. Claude, Duke of Guise
7. Mary of Guise
15. Antoinette of Bourbon

== List of writings ==
- The Essayes of a Prentise in the Divine Art of Poesie (also called Some Reulis and Cautelis), 1584
- His Majesties Poeticall Exercises at Vacant Houres, 1591
  - Lepanto, poem
- Daemonologie, 1597
- Extra-titular Works from the Collected Demonology, 1616
  - A Letter To The Whole Church Militant,
  - The Argument Of This Whole Epistle,
  - A Paraphrase Upon The Revelation,
  - The Two Meditations
- The True Law of Free Monarchies, 1598
- Basilikon Doron, 1599
- A Counterblaste to Tobacco, 1604, a strong denunciation of tobacco
- An Apologie for the Oath of Allegiance, 1608
- A Premonition to All Most Mightie Monarches, 1609

== Sources ==
- Akrigg, G. P. V. (George Philip Vernon), ed. (1984), Letters of King James VI & I, Berkeley & Los Angeles: University of California, ISBN 978-0-5200-4707-5
- Barroll, J. Leeds (2001), Anna of Denmark, Queen of England: A Cultural Biography, Philadelphia: University of Pennsylvania, ISBN 978-0-8122-3574-6
- Bucholz, Robert; Key, Newton (2004), Early Modern England, 1485–1714: A Narrative History, Oxford: Blackwell, ISBN 978-0-6312-1393-2
- Cogswell, Thomas (2005) [1989], The Blessed Revolution: English Politics and the Coming of War 1621–24, Cambridge University Press, ISBN 978-0-5210-2313-9
- Courtney, Alexander (2024), James VI, Britannic Prince: King of Scots and Elizabeth's Heir, 1566–1603, London: Routledge, ISBN 978-1-138-60626-5
- Croft, Pauline (2003), King James, Basingstoke and New York: Palgrave Macmillan, ISBN 978-0-3336-1395-5.
- Davies, Godfrey (1959) [1937], The Early Stuarts, Oxford: Clarendon Press
- Donaldson, Gordon (1974), Mary, Queen of Scots, London: English Universities Press, ISBN 978-0-3401-2383-6
- Fischlin, Daniel; Fortier, Mark (2002), "'Enregistrate Speech': Stratagems of Monarchic Writing in the Work of James VI and I", in Fischlin, Daniel; Fortier, Mark (eds.), Royal Subjects: Essays on the Writings of James VI and I, Wayne State University Press, ISBN 978-0-8143-2877-4
- Guy, John (2004), My Heart is My Own: The Life of Mary Queen of Scots, London and New York: Fourth Estate, ISBN 978-1-8411-5752-8
- Hunter, James (2000), Last of the Free: A History of the Highlands and Islands of Scotland, Edinburgh: Mainstream, ISBN 978-1-8401-8376-4
- Jack, R. D. S. (Ronald) (1988), "Poetry under King James VI", in Craig, Cairns (ed.), The History of Scottish Literature, vol. 1, Aberdeen University Press
- Jackson, Clare (2025), The Mirror of Great Britain: A Life of James VI and I, London: Allen Lane, ISBN 978-0-241-61127-2
- Keay, John; Keay, Julia (1994), Collins Encyclopaedia of Scotland, London: HarperCollins, ISBN 978-0-0025-5082-6
- Krugler, John D. (2004), English and Catholic: The Lords Baltimore in the Seventeenth Century, Baltimore: Johns Hopkins University Press, ISBN 978-0-8018-7963-0
- Law, Thomas Graves (1904), "John Craig", in Brown, P. Hume (ed.), Collected Essays and Reviews of Thomas Graves Law, Edinburgh: T. & A. Constable, Edinburgh University Press
- Lindley, David (1993), The Trials of Frances Howard: Fact and Fiction at the Court of King James, Routledge, ISBN 978-0-4150-5206-1
- Lockyer, Roger (1981), Buckingham: The Life and Political Career of George Villiers, First Duke of Buckingham, 1592–1628, Longman, ISBN 978-0-5825-0296-3
- —— (1998), James VI and I, Longman, ISBN 978-0-5822-7961-2
- MacKinnon, Kenneth (1991), Gaelic – A Past and Future Prospect, Edinburgh: The Saltire Society, ISBN 978-0-8541-1047-6
- Martin, Patrick H. (2016), Elizabethan Espionage: Plotters and Spies in the Struggle Between Catholicism and the Crown, Jefferson, North Carolina: McFarland, ISBN 978-1-4766-6255-8
- Milling, Jane (2004), "The Development of a Professional Theatre", in Milling, Jane; Thomson, Peter; Donohue, Joseph W. (eds.), The Cambridge History of British Theatre, Cambridge: Cambridge University Press, ISBN 978-0-5216-5040-3
- Pearce, Michael (2022), "'Maskerye claythis' for James VI and Anna of Denmark", in Twycross, Meg (ed.), Medieval English Theatre 43, Cambridge: D. S. Brewer, ISBN 978-1-84384-630-7
- Perry, Curtis (2006), Literature and Favoritism in Early Modern England, Cambridge; New York: Cambridge University Press, ISBN 978-0-5218-5405-4
- Pinches, John; Pinches, Rosemary (1974), The Royal Heraldry of England, London: Heraldry Today, ISBN 0-9004-5525-X
- Reid, Steven (2023), The Early Life of James VI: A Long Apprenticeship, 1566–1585, Edinburgh: John Donald, ISBN 978-1-910900-185
- Rhodes, Neil; Richards, Jennifer; Marshall, Joseph (2003), King James VI and I: Selected Writings, Ashgate Publishing, ISBN 978-0-7546-0482-2
- Rotary Club of Stornoway (1995), The Outer Hebrides Handbook and Guide, Machynlleth: Kittiwake, ISBN 978-0-9511-0035-6
- Schama, Simon (2001), A History of Britain, vol. II, New York: Hyperion, ISBN 978-0-7868-6752-3
- Smith, David L. (2003), "Politics in Early Stuart Britain", in Coward, Barry (ed.), A Companion to Stuart Britain, Blackwell Publishing, ISBN 978-0-6312-1874-6
- Stewart, Alan (2003), The Cradle King: A Life of James VI & I, London: Chatto and Windus, ISBN 978-0-7011-6984-8
- Stroud, Angus (1999), Stuart England, Routledge, ISBN 978-0-4152-0652-5
- Thompson, Francis (1968), Harris and Lewis, Outer Hebrides, Newton Abbot: David & Charles, ISBN 978-0-7153-4260-2
- Thomson, Thomas, ed. (1827), Sir James Melvill of Halhill; Memoirs of his own life, Bannatyne Club
- Warnicke, Retha M. (2006). Mary Queen of Scots. New York: Routledge. ISBN 978-0-4152-9182-8.
- Williams, Ethel Carleton (1970), Anne of Denmark, London: Longman, ISBN 978-0-5821-2783-8
- Willson, David Harris (1963) [1956], King James VI & I, London: Jonathan Cape
- Wormald, Jenny (May 2011) [2004], "James VI and I (1566–1625)", Oxford Dictionary of National Biography (online ed.), Oxford University Press, doi:10.1093/ref:odnb/14592 (Subscription, Wikipedia Library access or UK public library membership required.)

James VI of Scotland & I of England House of Stuart Born: 19 June 1566 Died: 27 March 1625
Regnal titles
Preceded by Mary	King of Scotland; 1567–1625	Succeeded by Charles I
Preceded by Elizabeth I	King of England and Ireland; 1603–1625	Succeeded by Charles I
Peerage of Scotland
Vacant Title last held by James	Duke of Rothesay; 1566–1567	Vacant Title next held by Henry Frederick
Preceded by Henry Stuart	Duke of Albany; 4th creation 1567	Merged with the Crown
