= Harold J. Grimm =

American academic and historian (1901–1983)

- Born: August 16, 1901; Saginaw, Michigan. U.S.
- Died: 1983 (aged 81–82); Columbus, Ohio, U.S.

Academic background
- Education: Ohio State University (PhD)

Academic work
- Discipline: History
- Sub-discipline: Reformation studies

Harold John Grimm (August 16, 1901 – 1983) was an academic, historian, and writer and an expert on the Reformation.

Born in Saginaw in Michigan in 1901, Grimm gained his PhD at Ohio State University. Grimm's numerous posts as an educator included Professor of History at Capital University, Ohio State University, and Indiana University. He was department chairman at Ohio State and Indiana universities. In 1978, Grimm received the Distinguished Teacher award at Ohio State University. He was a Fulbright Teaching Fellow at the University of Freiburg.

Grimm was a member of numerous societies and associations. He was president of the Ohio Historical Society and the American Society for Reformation Research. He contributed many articles to professional journals and was the American editor for the Archiv für Reformationsgeschichte.

During his academic career Grimm collected about 200 volumes of books and pamphlets from the Reformation period. After his death, the collection was donated to Ohio State University Libraries and form the core of the Harold J. Grimm Reformation Collection, which now includes over 550 volumes.

Grimm died in Columbus, Ohio, in 1983. The Harold J. Grimm Prize, awarded by the Sixteenth Century Society and Conference for the best article on the Reformation published during the previous year, is named after Grimm.

== Publications ==
- Grimm, Harold J. Martin Luther as a Preacher (1929)
- Grimm, Harold J. (editor) Christian Liberty by Martin Luther Fortress Press (1985) ISBN 978-0-8006-0182-9
- Grimm, Harold J. (Design) Luther's Ninety-Five Theses Fortress Press (1957)
- Grimm, Harold J. Luther's Works Vol 31: Career of the Reformer Fortress Press (1957)
- Grimm, Harold J. Reformation Era, 1500-1650 Macmillan (1974) ISBN 0-02-347270-7
- Grimm, Harold J. The Reformation in Recent Historical Thought Publication 54 The Macmillan Company, New York (1964)
