= Ute Lotz-Heumann =

German-American historian (born 1966)

Ute Lotz-Heumann (born 1966) is a German-American historian specializing in early modern Irish and German history and the history of the European Reformations and Enlightenment. She is the Heiko A. Oberman Professor of Late Medieval and Reformation History at the University of Arizona in Tucson, Arizona.

== Education ==
Lotz-Heumann holds a Ph.D. in History from Humboldt University in Berlin, Germany, where she also received her habilitation in 2010.

== Career ==
She has published extensively in both German and English on topics relating to cultural history, the historiography of the Reformation, and the histories of both Ireland and Germany. Her most recent publication, The German Spa in the Long Eighteenth-Century: A Cultural History was published by Routledge in 2022. Lotz-Heumann is well known in the field of Reformation historiography, having been selected to lead a conference at the Herzog August Bibliothek in Germany entitled "The Cultural History of the Reformation: Current Research and Future Perspectives." She is also a member of the Editorial Board for the scholarly series Studies in Medieval and Reformation Traditions published by Brill.

She is currently the director of the Division for Late Medieval and Reformation Studies at the University of Arizona, and the North American Managing Co-Editor of the Archive for Reformation History.

== Selected bibliography ==
Monographs:

- The German Spa in the Long Eighteenth Century A Cultural History (Routledge, 2021) ISBN 9780367440954
- Die doppelte Konfessionalisierung in Irland: Konflikt und Koexistenz im 16. und in der ersten Hälfte des 17. (Tübingen: Mohr Siebeck, 2000) ISBN 978-3161474293

Multi-authored books:

- Säkularisierungen in der Frühen Neuzeit: Methodische Probleme und empirische Fallstudien (Berlin: Duncker & Humblot, 2008) ISBN 978-3-428-12943-0

Edited volumes of essays:

- The Cultural History of the Reformations: Theories and Applications. (Wolfenbüttel: Herzog August Bibliothek, 2021). ISBN 978-3-447-11469-1
- Entfaltung und zeitgenössische Wirkung der Reformation im europäischen Kontext/Dissemination and Contemporary Impact of the Reformation in a European Context. (Gütersloh: Gütersloher Verlagshaus, 2015). ISBN 978-3-579-05995-2
- Alteuropa – Vormoderne – Neue Zeit Epochen und Dynamiken der europäischen Geschichte (1200–1800). (Berlin: Duncker & Humblot, 2012). ISBN 978-3-428-13867-8.
- Konversion und Konfession in der frühen Neuzeit. (Gütersloh: Gütersloher Verlagshaus, 2007). ISBN 9783579057613
- Stadt und Religion in der frühen Neuzeit: Soziale Ordnungen und ihre Repräsentationen. (Frankfurt/Main, New York: Campus, 2007). ISBN 9783593384368
- Wege der Neuzeit: Festschrift für Heinz Schilling zum 65. Geburtstag. (Berlin: Duncker & Humblot, 2007). ISBN 978-3428123940
- Taking sides? Colonial and confessional menalités in early modern Ireland. (Dublin: Four Courts Press, 2003). ISBN 1-85182-683-1

Textbooks:

- A Sourcebook of Early Modern European History: Life, Death, and Everything in Between (London, New York: Routledge, 2019) ISBN 978-0815373520
- Reformation und konfessionelles Zeitalter. (Darmstadt: Wissenschaftliche Buchgesellschaft, 2002, 2nd, revised edition 2008). ISBN 9783534147748.

Articles:

- Ute Lotz-Heumann, “Diary of Samuel Pepys shows how life under the bubonic plague mirrored today’s pandemic,” The Conversation 24 April 2020, https://theconversation.com/diary-of-samuel-pepys-shows-how-life-under-the-bubonic-plague-mirrored-todays-pandemic-136222.
- Karl S. Bottigheimer and Ute Lotz-Heumann, “Ireland and the European Reformation,” History Ireland 6/4 (1998): 13-16.
