= David Harris Willson =

American historian (1901–1973)

David Harris Willson (May 18, 1901 – December 11, 1973) was an American historian and professor who specialized in the history of 17th-century England.

== Early life and education ==
Willson's progenitors bearing the Willson name first arrived from England in 1638, settling in Dedham, Massachusetts. Another English progenitor, John Harris, Sr., founded Harrisburg, Pennsylvania. David Harris Willson's parents were Thomas Harris Willson and Amelia Shryrock Willson. He was born in Philadelphia, Pennsylvania.

Willson attended Haddonfield Friends School in Haddonfield, New Jersey, then Friends Select School in Philadelphia. He attended Haverford College in Philadelphia, graduating in 1921. While at Haverford he was selected for a fellowship at Cornell University in Ithaca, New York, where he pursued a Ph.D. in English History. He received a 1923 prize which allowed him to complete his research in England, and while in England he was recommended for an instructor position at the University of Minnesota. He moved to Minneapolis in September 1924 to begin that assignment, and his Ph.D. (from Cornell) was granted in 1925.

== Teaching career ==
Willson remained at the University of Minnesota until 1969. During that time he was also active in teaching and historical research. He taught summer school at the University of Chicago in 1931 and at Duke University in 1936. He was secretary of the Modern European History section of the American Historical Association from 1941 until 1946. He served on the Robert Livingston Schuyler Prize Committee. He served on the advisory board of the Yale Parliamentary Diaries Project. He sat on the program committee of the Midwest Conference on British Studies from 1959 until 1962, and was president of that conference from 1965 until 1967.

Willson was a visiting professor at the University of Texas in 1966 and 1967.

== Writing career ==
Willson's first book was The Parliamentary Diary of Robert Bowyer, 1606-1607, published by University of Minnesota Press in 1931. His second book was Privy Councillors in the House of Commons, 1604-1629, published by University of Minnesota Press in 1940. His third book was King James VI and I, published by Cope, Hall in 1956. His magnum opus, co-authored with Stuart E. Prall, is A History of England, which was first published in 1967 by Holt and has undergone several subsequent editions.

Willson wrote numerous articles and reviews in US and English journals.

== Academic and career honors ==
Willson received the Laura Messenger Prize in History (1923), which allowed him to travel to England for research on his doctoral dissertation. He received two Guggenheim Fellowships (1941-1943 and 1948–1949). In a September 1994 interview, American historian Stanford Lehmberg stated:

David Harris Willson was probably the most distinguished historian of Seventeenth-Century England and the most distinguished Stuart historian of his generation.

== Personal life ==
Willson met Lillian Kemp Malone at the University of Minnesota, where she was pursuing an MA degree in French. She graduated in 1927 and began teaching at a private school for girls; she and Willson were married in September 1928. They had one child, son John Harris Willson.

David Harris Willson died in 1973 in St. Paul, Minnesota.
