= Donald J. Harreld =

American historian

Donald James Harreld is a former professor of history with a dual appointment in European studies at Brigham Young University (BYU).

Harreld specialized in the early modern history of the Netherlands. He was also the executive director of the Sixteenth Century Society and Conference from 2008 to 2018. Harreld teaches a course for The Teaching Company on economic history. Harreld holds undergraduate and master's degrees and a Ph.D. from the University of Minnesota. After his early retirement from BYU, Harreld was vice president for the Education Practice Area of the Fedcap Group, a New York City-based international non profit organization. He separated from Fedcap in 2021.

== Publications ==
- "Atlantic Sugar and Atwerper's Trade with Germany in the Sixteenth Century" in Journal of Early Modern History Vol. 7 (2003) no. 1–2, p. 148–63.
- "Trading Places: The Public and Private Spaces of Merchants in Sixteenth-Century Antwerp" in Journal of Urban History Vol. 29 (2003), issue 6, p. 657–69.
- High Germans in the Low Countries: German Merchants and Commerce in Golden Age Antwerp. (Leiden: Brill Publishers, 2004).
- "'How Great the Enterprise, How Glorious the Deed': Seventeenth Century Dutch Circumnavigation as Useful Myths" in Laura Cruz and Willem Frijhoff, ed., Myth in History, History in Myths.
