= The True Law of Free Monarchies =

Treatise of political theory by James VI and I

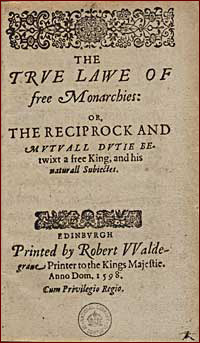
Title page of The True Law of Free Monarchies.

The True Law of Free Monarchies: Or, The Reciprocal and Mutual Duty Between a Free King and His Natural Subjects (original Scots title: The Trve Lawe of free Monarchies: Or, The Reciprock and Mvtvall Dvtie Betwixt a free King, and his naturall Subiectes) is a treatise or essay of political theory and kingship by James VI of Scotland (later to be crowned James I of England too).

It is believed James VI wrote the tract to set forth his idea of kingship, rather absolutist, in clear contrast to the contractarian views espoused by, among others, James's childhood tutor George Buchanan (in De Jure Regni apud Scotos, 1579), that held the idea that monarchs rule in accordance of some sort of contract with their people. James saw the divine right of kings as an extension of the apostolic succession, as both not being subjected by humanly laws.

James VI had this work published in 1598 in Edinburgh in the form of a small octavo pamphlet. It is considered remarkable for setting out the doctrine of the divine right of kings in Scotland, for the first time. Another octavo edition was published in London in 1603, the same year of James' coronation as King of England.
