= Nancy Lyman Roelker =

American Historian, Author and Educator

Nancy Lyman Roelker (June 15, 1915 - November 27, 1993) was an American historian and educator whose focus was 16th-century French history. Her devotion to mentoring graduate students was recognized with the American Historical Association creating the Nancy Lyman Roelker Mentorship Award.

== Early life and education ==
Nancy Lyman Roelker was one of two daughters born in Warwick, Rhode Island, to William Greene Roelker, and Anna (Koues) Roelker.

William Greene Roelker's family line traces all the way back to the earliest settlers in Rhode Island, and includes numbers of prominent community leaders and governors. When he died suddenly in 1953 he was Director of the Rhode Island Historical Society where he greatly expanded its holdings.

Nancy Roelker received her A.B. from Radcliffe College in 1936, where she was a member of Phi Beta Kappa. Like her father, Roelker received her A.M. from Harvard University, in 1937, and 16 years later, her Ph.D. also at Harvard, in 1953.

Between her master’s degree and her Ph.D Roelker studied with Alfred North Whitehead and in 1940 presented a dissertation she had completed in two years, An Application Of Whitehead’s Concepts Of Conformity and Novelty to the Philosophy of History. Because the faculty did not believe she could have done it, they refused to accept it and delayed her doctoral progress.

== Career ==
She taught European history from 1937 to 1941 at Concord Academy in Concord, Massachusetts, and from 1941 to 1963 at Winsor School in Boston, Massachusetts. Soon after she transitioned to university teaching, her career expanded. Starting as an assistant professor at Tufts University in Medford, Massachusetts in 1963, she was promoted to associate professor in 1965 and full professor in 1969. In 1971 Roelker became professor of European history at Boston University and continued until her retirement in 1980.

== Later life ==
Though Nancy Roelker did not formally teach at Rhode Island’s Brown University, in her retirement she pursued opportunities to mentor graduate students there.

Her personal and academic papers are part of the John Hays Library Special Collections. Roelker died in her family's ancestral home East Greenwich, Rhode Island, in late 1993. She was 78.

== Books ==
- The Paris of Henry of Navarre, as Seen by Pierre de l'Etoile (1958)
- Queen of Navarre, Jeanne d'Albret: 1528–1572. Cambridge Massachusetts: Belknap Press of Harvard University Press. 1968. ISBN 0-674-74150-1.
- One King, One Faith: The Parlement of Paris and the Religious Reformations of the Sixteenth Century. Berkley: University of California Press. 1996. ISBN 0-520-08626-0.

== Awards and recognition ==
In 1960 and 1970 she received research grants from the American Philosophical Society.

In 1964 she was elected to the American Academy of Arts and Sciences.

In 1965–66 she was a Guggenheim Fellow.

In 1970 she received the Distinguished Achievement Medal from the Radcliffe Graduate Society.

In 1985 she was awarded the Gold Medal of Paris for contributions to that city’s history.

== Legacy ==
After her death in 1993, two organizations established awards in Roelker’s name:

- The Nancy Lyman Roelker Mentorship Award through the American Historical Association gives recognition annually to educators who excel in mentoring.
- The Nancy Lyman Roelker Prize through the Sixteenth Century Society.
