= Sixteenth Century Society and Conference =

The Sixteenth Century Society and Conference (SCSC) is a learned society that promotes research on the early modern period.

The society is interdisciplinary in membership, welcoming scholars in history, art history, religion, history of science, musicology, dance history, and literary and cultural studies in English, French, German, Italian, and Spanish.

== History and operations ==
Founded in 1969, its initial officers included Kyle Sessions as president and Miriam Usher Chrisman as vice president.

The SCSC has close associations with an academic journal, the Sixteenth Century Journal (SCJ), and with the Iter bibliographic database. The society also sponsors a book series, Early Modern Studies, now published by the Truman State University Press. In 1990, it established an endowment and joined the American Council of Learned Societies.

The SCSC holds an annual conference, usually during October.

Its presidents have included Walter S. Melion of Emory University, Amy Burnett, Department of History, University of Nebraska–Lincoln, and Executive Director Donald J. Harreld, Department of History, Brigham Young University.

=== Prizes awarded by the SCSC ===
- Roland H. Bainton Book Prize
- Gerald Strauss Prize
- Harold J. Grimm Prize
- John Tedeschi Prize
- SCSC Literature Prize
- Nancy Lyman Roelker Prize
- Carl S. Meyer Prize
- Richard Kieckhefer Prize
- Sixteenth Century Society and Conference Medal
