= Archive for Reformation History =

Academic journal

Archive for Reformation History (German: Archiv für Reformationsgeschichte; ARG) is a specialised international annual academic journal for the Reformation era.

It is a bilingual joint publication of the German Verein für Reformationsgeschichte and American Society for Reformation Research (SRR), and also includes articles in French and Italian.

Thomas Kaufmann, University of Göttingen, and Martin Kessler, University of Basel, are the European Managing Editors, responsible for articles in German, French, and Italian. Ute Lotz-Heumann and Marjorie E. Plummer, both University of Arizona, are the North American Managing Editors, responsible for articles in English.

== History ==
The first volume of the journal was published in 1903/04 by Verlag Gerd Mohn, based in Gütersloh, under the auspices of the Verein für Reformationsgeschichte with Walter Friedensburg as the editor who served until his death in 1938.

Gerhard Ritter, appointed as the new editor in 1938, jointly developed a new concept for the magazine with Otto Scheel and Heinrich Bornkamm.

Publication was suspended between 1944–1947 and 1949–1950. The Society for Reformation Research came on board in 1951, bringing a more international dimension to the publication.
