= John Bourn =

British auditor (1934–2022)

Sir John Bourn KCB

Comptroller and Auditor General
- In office 1 January 1988 – 2008
- Monarch: Elizabeth II
- Preceded by: Gordon Downey
- Succeeded by: Tim Burr (interim); Amyas Morse

Auditor General for Wales
- In office 1999–2005
- Preceded by: New position
- Succeeded by: Jeremy Colman

Personal details
- Born: 21 February 1934 Hornsey, London, United Kingdom
- Died: 22 November 2022 (aged 88)
- Spouse: Ardita Bourn
- Children: Two
- Education: London School of Economics

Sir John Bryant Bourn KCB (21 February 1934 – 22 November 2022) was a British auditor who was the Comptroller and Auditor General and therefore a head of the National Audit Office.

== Early life and education ==
Bourn was born in Hornsey, London, on 21 February 1934. He attended Southgate School from 1945 to 1951. He completed a B.Sc. and Ph.D. in economics at the London School of Economics.

== Public career ==
Bourn entered the UK civil service at the top-entry level. He worked in the Air Ministry before spending a year at HM Treasury. He then spent time at the Civil Service College, Ministry of Defence and the Northern Ireland Office, where he was for some time Deputy Under Secretary of State, the UK government's most senior civil servant in Northern Ireland. He was a Deputy Under Secretary of State in the Ministry of Defence before he became the Comptroller and Auditor General on 1 January 1988.

As comptroller and auditor general, Bourn certified the accounts of all UK Government departments and a wide range of other public sector bodies; and he had statutory authority to report to Parliament on the economy, efficiency and effectiveness with which departments and other bodies used their resources. Under his leadership, the National Audit Office won contracts to carry out substantial work overseas, including for the United Nations, the European Commission, and for a number of countries around the world. During his tenure Bourn was Chairman of the Multilateral Audit Advisory Group of the World Bank, and he also was a member (and chairman) of the Panel of External Auditors of the United Nations. Additionally, he was a member of the Governing Boards of the International and of the European Organisations of National Audit Offices and Courts of Audit. He was also appointed the first Auditor General for Wales until Jeremy Colman took over this role on 1 April 2005.

In March 2006 he was appointed the first Independent Advisor on Ministerial Interests by Tony Blair, to advise ministers on potential clashes between their public duties and private affairs, and to investigate any claims that the rules have been broken. This appointment was revoked in 2007 following the controversy around his travel expenditure.

On 25 October 2007 his office announced his retirement in 2008 after 20 years as Comptroller and Auditor General and head of the National Audit Office.

== Other appointments and work ==
Bourn served as a board member of the Financial Reporting Council and as Chair of the Professional Oversight Board of the Council and its predecessor body, the Review Board of the Accountancy Foundation 2000-2008. The council’s responsibilities include the oversight of public and private sector financial service providers, including accountants, auditors and actuaries. The tasks of the Financial Reporting Council are to set standards for corporate governance, reporting, auditing and actuarial practice; monitor and, where appropriate, enforce the application of those standards; and work with the accountancy and actuarial professions to promote the professionalism of their members. The Council and its Boards are engaged in international discussions with financial services regulators in the US, France, Germany, the European Commission and other countries.

Bourn was senior advisor to the Foundation for Governance Research and Education, where he specialised in corporate governance arrangements and improvements in the public and private sectors, particularly in banks. Among other non-executive appointments he was also a Companion of the Institute of Management and a Fellow of the Chartered Institute of Purchasing and Supply.

== Academic career ==
Bourn was a part-time teacher at the London School of Economics from the time he was a graduate student, serving as a visiting professor from 1983 to 2013. He continued to teach at the School on executive and custom programmes, with particular reference to students and participants from overseas, including India, Indonesia, China and Hong Kong, Brazil, Thailand, Kazakhstan, and Spain. He specialised in issues of public sector management and policy analysis, including financial management, accountancy and audit, and covered UK and overseas experience.

In May 1998, he was awarded an Honorary Degree from the Open University as Doctor of the University, having also being awarded the highest honour from the London School of Economics, an Honorary Fellow. He started his career at the London School of Economics where he took a first class honours degree in Economics and a PhD. He was also an Honorary Fellow of the University of Brighton, an Honorary Doctor of Laws of Brunel University, and an Honorary Doctor of Business Administration of the University of the West of England.

== Criticism ==
=== Al-Yamamah arms deals ===
Bourn's role at the Ministry of Defence, from 1985 to 1988, before becoming Comptroller and Auditor General, was as the most senior civil servant responsible for defence procurement. This, according to The Spectator, would have given him a "ringside seat" in the negotiations surrounding the first Al-Yamamah arms deal.

15 months after becoming Comptroller and Auditor General, in April 1989, Bourn announced a National Audit Office inquiry into the Al-Yamamah deal. The report was drawn up between 1989 and 1991, and was presented to Lord Sheldon, then the chairman of the Public Accounts Committee. However, the report was never published, making it the only NAO report to have ever been withheld.

In 2006, the Serious Fraud Office and Ministry of Defence Police were investigating the Al-Yamamah arms deals, and requested the report from the National Audit Office, however, Bourn withheld it. Harry Cohen criticised Bourn's stance as it looked like a "serious conflict of interest". The agencies were reportedly considering a "dawn raid of the NAO’s offices" in order to obtain the report.

=== Expenses ===
Bourn was criticised by opposition parties and the media over his high spending, such as an overseas trip that ran up taxpayer costs of more than £16,000. His expenses and conduct were frequently highlighted in the satirical magazine Private Eye. In September 2008 the magazine published a special report, 'The Bourn Complicity', alleging that under his leadership numerous government expenditure failings escaped scrutiny while Bourn (frequently accompanied by his wife) went on unnecessary and extravagant foreign trips, and accepted lavish hospitality from contractors.

Freedom of Information Act requests show that, in the three years to March 2007, Bourn made 43 overseas visits; Private Eye claimed this was far more than the revenue generated would justify, and that in many cases more junior staff should have gone instead; on 22 of these trips, Bourn was accompanied by his wife. He claimed £336,000 in travel expenses in addition to his £164,430 salary, while staying almost exclusively in five star hotels, while flying exclusively first class on long haul and business class on shorter visits. A spokesman for Bourn claimed that he normally stayed at hotels which were "recommended by the host organisation", but an investigation by The Daily Telegraph suggested that on several of the most expensive trips, no such recommendations were made.

It emerged that Bourn travelled to and from his office in Victoria, London in a chauffeur driven vehicle at the taxpayers' expense. The financial cost of this is unknown because it had been funded directly from the consolidated fund and therefore was not included within the NAO's accounts. Additionally, the personal benefit to his wife of NAO-funded travel had not been fully accounted for. When HM Revenue and Customs investigated these as taxable benefits, Bourn was found liable for six years of unpaid taxes - but the outstanding sum of about £100,000 (including a fine) was settled by the NAO out of taxpayers' money. In October 2015, Private Eye highlighted how criticisms of Bourn's expenditure had been removed from Wikipedia, citing right to be forgotten.

== Personal life and death ==
Bourn was married to Ardita and they had a son and a daughter. He died on 22 November 2022, at the age of 88.

== See also ==
- National Audit Office
- Wales Audit Office
