= Allyson Pollock =

American consultant

- Education: University of Dundee
- Medical career
- Profession: Doctor
- Field: Public health
- Website: www.allysonpollock.com

Allyson Pollock is a consultant in public health medicine and was the Director of the Institute of Health and Society, Newcastle University. She is an academic who is known for her research into, and opposition to, part privatisation of the UK National Health Service (NHS) via the Private Finance Initiative (PFI) and other mechanisms.

== Education ==
Pollock gained a BSc in physiology at the University of Dundee in Scotland then became a medical graduate (MB ChB) of the same university. She later completed an MSc at the London School of Hygiene & Tropical Medicine. She became a consultant in public health medicine in 1991.

== Career ==
Pollock was head of the Public Health Policy Unit at University College London and director of research and development at University College London Hospitals NHS Foundation Trust.

Pollock set up and directed the Centre for International Public Health Policy at the University of Edinburgh from 2005 to 2011.

She was professor of public health research and policy at Barts and The London School of Medicine and Dentistry, Queen Mary University of London

In 2014, she was elected to the Council of the British Medical Association, for a four-year term.

In January 2017, she became the Director of the Institute of Health and Society, Newcastle University.

== Work on PFI ==
Allyson Pollock has provided evidence to the British Parliament and the Welsh National Assembly regarding PFI. Under her directorship CIPHP provided evidence to the Scottish Parliament regarding PFI.

In their statements of evidence, Allyson Pollock and her co-researcher Mark Hellowell argue that capital investment through PFI creates a large public sector cash liability. For example, they say that the £5.2 billion of PFI investment in Scotland has created a public sector cash liability of £22.3bn. This cash liability is 'off balance-sheet' and does not show up on government statistics such as the Public Sector Borrowing Requirement (PSBR).

Pollock and Hellowell also say that, although the UK government's support for PFI is based on its supposed ability to deliver good value for money, the mechanisms for testing this are skewed. While developing PFI proposals, contracting authorities such as NHS trusts are required to construct a theoretical alternative to the use of PFI, which compares the value for money offered by a public versus a private finance scheme. The publicly funded alternative is called a 'public sector comparator'. In theory, if this exercise concludes that PFI does not represent good value for money compared to public finance, then the latter should be used for the procurement. However, in practice this rarely happens.

The reasons for this are discussed in a paper co-written by Pollock and published in the BMJ. Pollock et al. conclude that the true risks of many privately financed contracts are not calculated correctly. They argue that the system involves a high degree of subjectivity regarding the value of the risk being transferred to the private sector. They take one example of an NHS project in which one of the risks theoretically being transferred was that the target for clinical cost savings would not be met. The cost of this risk was estimated at £5m. However, in practice the private consortium had no responsibility for ensuring that there would actually be clinical cost-savings, and faced no penalty if there were none. The paper concludes therefore that the risk transfer was "spurious".

Jeremy Colman, former deputy general of the National Audit Office and the current Auditor General for Wales has supported Pollock's findings. In a Financial Times article he is quoted as saying many PFI appraisals suffer from "spurious precision" and others are based on "pseudo-scientific mumbo-jumbo". Some, he says, are simply "utter rubbish". He noted the pressures on contracting authorities to weight their appraisal in favour of taking their projects down the PFI route: "If the answer comes out wrong you don't get your project. So the answer doesn't come out wrong very often."

== School rugby injuries ==
Pollock's son played rugby and suffered serious injury on three occasions before the age of 16: a broken nose, a fractured leg and a fractured cheekbone with concussion. Following this she has spent more than a decade researching the risks involved. In 2014 she said "rugby union in schools must distinguish itself from the very brutal game practiced by the professionals." She criticised poor monitoring of injuries sustained during games played by school children. She cited research from Ireland which found that in children of secondary school age the rate of injury in rugby was three times higher than other sports. In the course of a season, children have a 20% chance of concussion or bone fracture and one in seven parents have considered withdrawing their child from the games.

In March 2016, Pollock was one of more than 70 doctors and academics who were signatories to an open letter seeking a ban on tackling in school level rugby matches. This group set out details of the risks involved in the letter addressed to ministers, chief medical officers and children's commissioners in England, Scotland, Wales, Northern Ireland and the Republic of Ireland. World Rugby, the sport's governing body, responded by releasing the results of a survey that stated 92% of parents of children aged between seven and 18-years-old believed that the benefits of children playing sport outweighs the risks.

== Publications (selection) ==
- Gaffney, D.; Pollock, Allyson M.; Price, D.; Shaoul, J. (1999), "NHS Capital Expenditure and the Private Finance Initiative", British Medical Journal, 319 (7201): 48–51, doi:10.1136/bmj.319.7201.48, PMC 1116147, PMID 10390465
- Gaffney, D.; Pollock, Allyson M.; Price, D.; Shaoul, J. (1999), "PFI in the NHS: is there an economic case?", British Medical Journal, 319 (7202): 116–119, doi:10.1136/bmj.319.7202.116, PMC 1116198, PMID 10398642
- House of Commons, Treasury Committee (2000), The Private Finance Initiative: Minutes of Evidence, Tuesday 11 January 2000 - Prof.Stephen Glaister; Mr.Tony Travers; Ms.Rosemary Scanlon; Prof.Allyson Pollock (House of Commons Papers), Stationery Office Books, ISBN 978-0-10-212600-6
- Pollock, Allyson; Shaoul; Rowland; Player (2001), Public Services and the Private Sector: A Response to the IPPR (Catalyst Working Papers), Catalyst Press, ISBN 978-0-9533224-7-3
- Pollock, Allyson M. (2005), NHS Plc: The Privatisation of Our Health Care, Verso Books, ISBN 978-1-84467-539-5
- Pollock, Allyson M.; Talbot-Smith (2006), The New NHS: A Guide: A Guide to Its Funding, Organisation and Accountability, Routledge, ISBN 978-0-415-32841-8
- Hellowell, Mark; Pollock, Allyson M. (2007), The PFI: Scotland's Plan for Expansion and its Implications (PDF), University of Edinburgh
- Hellowell, Mark; Pollock, Allyson M. (2007), Written Evidence to the National Assembly for Wales Finance Committee with Regards to its Inquiry on Public Private Partnerships (PDF), University of Edinburgh
- Hellowell, Mark (2007), Written evidence to the Finance Committee of the Scottish Parliament with regards to its inquiry into the funding of capital investment (PDF), University of Edinburgh

=== In the popular press ===
The Guardian

- Pollock, Allyson (24 March 2006), "A Clean Bill for Health", The Guardian
- Pollock, Allyson (11 April 2007), "A Gauntlet for Brown", The Guardian
- Pollock, Allyson (4 October 2007), "The New Profiteers", The Guardian
- Pollock, Allyson (11 June 2008), "Operating Profits", The Guardian
- Pollock, Allyson (1 July 2008), "Farewell to a Free NHS", The Guardian

The Herald

- Pollock, Allyson (April 2008), "We Have To Tackle Child Injury On The Sports Field", The Herald
- Pollock, Allyson (12 September 2008). "Out-of-Hours GP Battle That We Simply Must Win". The Herald.
- Pollock, Allyson (25 September 2008). "Tayside Health Board Do Not Care About Kinloch Rannoch". The Herald.

The Real News Network

- Pollock, Allyson (29 October 2014), "Ebola: A Disease of Extraordinary Poverty (part 1 of 2)", The Real News Network
- Pollock, Allyson (31 October 2014), "Ebola: A Disease of Extraordinary Poverty (part 2 of 2)", The Real News Network
