= Comptroller and Auditor General (United Kingdom) =

Government official in the UK

Comptroller and Auditor General of the United Kingdom
- Royal Arms of His Majesty's Government
- Incumbent; Gareth Davies
- National Audit Office
- Reports to: Public Accounts Commission
- Seat: Westminster
- Appointer: The Crown on advice of the Prime Minister
- Term length: At His Majesty's pleasure
- Formation: 1866
- First holder: Sir William Dunbar

The comptroller and auditor general (C&AG) in the United Kingdom is the government official responsible for supervising the quality of public accounting and financial reporting. The C&AG is an officer of the House of Commons who is the head of the National Audit Office, the body that scrutinises central government expenditure.

Under the Budget Responsibility and National Audit Act 2011, the C&AG is appointed by the monarch by letters patent upon an address of the House of Commons presented by the Prime Minister with the agreement of the Chair of the Public Accounts Committee. The C&AG can be removed from office, also by the monarch, only upon an address of both Houses of Parliament.

The full title of the office is Comptroller General of the Receipt and Issue of His Majesty's Exchequer and Auditor General of Public Accounts.

The current C&AG is Gareth Davies.

== History ==
The office of C&AG was created by the Exchequer and Audit Departments Act 1866, which combined the functions of the Comptroller General of the Exchequer, who had authorised the issue of public moneys from the Treasury to other government departments, with those of the Commissioners of Audit, who had presented the government accounts to the Treasury. Under the terms of the Act, the C&AG continued to authorise the issue of money to departments, but was also given the new task of examining departmental accounts and reporting the results to Parliament. The role has since been replicated in many Commonwealth and foreign countries.

== List of comptrollers and auditors general ==
- 1867 – Sir William Dunbar, 7th Baronet
- 1888 – Sir Charles Lister Ryan
- 1896 – Richard Mills
- 1900 – Douglas Close Richmond
- 1904 – Sir John Arrow Kempe
- 1911 – Sir Henry James Gibson
- 1921 – Sir Malcolm Graham Ramsay
- 1931 – Sir Gilbert Charles Upcott
- 1946 – Sir Frank Newton Tribe
- 1958 – Sir Edmund Compton
- 1966 – Sir Bruce Fraser
- 1971 – Sir David Pitblado
- 1976 – Sir Douglas Henley
- 1981 – Sir Gordon Downey
- 1988 – Sir John Bourn
- 2008 – Tim Burr
- 2009 – Sir Amyas Morse
- 2019 – Gareth Davies

== Devolved governments ==
=== Wales ===
The Auditor General for Wales is the public official in charge of Audit Wales, the body responsible for auditing the Welsh Government and £20 billion of taxpayers' money each year. It is a statutory appointment made by His Majesty the King, in accordance with the provisions of Schedule 8 to the Government of Wales Act 2006.

=== Scotland ===
The first Auditor General for Scotland was Robert Black, who was appointed in February 2000. The post had since been held by Caroline Gardner (July 2012 to July 2020) and Stephen Boyle.

=== Northern Ireland ===
The Comptroller and Auditor General for Northern Ireland is the head of the Northern Ireland Audit Office (NIAO), with responsibility for public audit in Northern Ireland.

== Other comptrollers and auditors general ==
- Comptroller and Auditor General of Bangladesh
- Auditor-General of Ghana
- Comptroller and Auditor General of India
- Comptroller and Auditor General (Ireland)
- Controller and Auditor-General of New Zealand

== See also ==
- Auditor general
- Comptroller
- Comptroller and Auditor General for Northern Ireland
- Auditor General for Wales
- Auditor General for Scotland
