= Private finance initiative =

United Kingdom government procurement policy

The private finance initiative (PFI) was a United Kingdom government procurement policy aimed at creating "public–private partnerships" (PPPs) where private firms are contracted to complete and manage public projects. Initially launched in 1992 by Prime Minister John Major, and expanded considerably by the Blair government, PFI is part of the wider programme of privatisation and macroeconomic public policy, and presented as a means for increasing accountability and efficiency for public spending.

PFI is controversial in the UK. In 2003, the National Audit Office felt that it provided good value for money overall; according to critics, PFI has been used simply to place a great amount of debt "off-balance-sheet". In 2011, the parliamentary Treasury Select Committee recommended:

"PFI should be brought on balance sheet. The Treasury should remove any perverse incentives unrelated to value for money by ensuring that PFI is not used to circumvent departmental budget limits. It should also ask the OBR to include PFI liabilities in future assessments of the fiscal rules".

In October 2018, the Chancellor Philip Hammond announced that the UK government would no longer use PFI for new infrastructure projects; however, PFI projects would continue to operate for some time to come.

== Overview ==
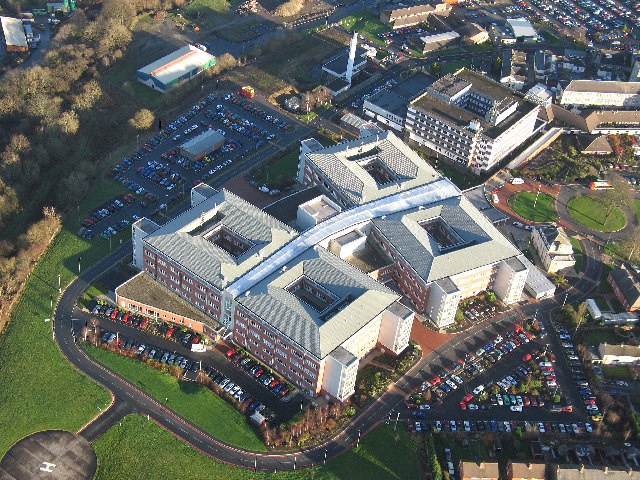
Cumberland Infirmary, one of the first projects funded using the PFI

The private finance initiative (PFI) is a procurement method which uses private sector investment in order to deliver public sector infrastructure and/or services according to a specification defined by the public sector. It is a sub-set of a broader procurement approach termed public-private partnership (PPP), with the main defining characteristic being the use of project finance (using private sector debt and equity, underwritten by the public) in order to deliver the public services. Beyond developing the infrastructure and providing finance, private sector companies operate the public facilities, sometimes using former public sector staff who have had their employment contracts transferred to the private sector through the TUPE process which applies to all staff in a company whose ownership changes.

== Mechanics ==
=== Contracts ===
A public sector authority signs a contract with a private sector consortium, technically known as a special-purpose vehicle (SPV). This consortium is typically formed for the specific purpose of providing the PFI. It is owned by a number of private sector investors, usually including a construction company and a service provider, and often a bank as well. The consortium's funding will be used to build the facility and to undertake maintenance and capital replacement during the life-cycle of the contract. Once the contract is operational, the SPV may be used as a conduit for contract amendment discussions between the customer and the facility operator. SPVs often charge fees for this go-between 'service'.

PFI contracts are typically for 25–30 years (depending on the type of project); although contracts less than 20 years or more than 40 years exist, they are considerably less common. During the period of the contract the consortium will provide certain services, which were previously provided by the public sector. The consortium is paid for the work over the course of the contract on a "no service no fee" performance basis.

The public authority will design an "output specification" which is a document setting out what the consortium is expected to achieve. If the consortium fails to meet any of the agreed standards it should lose an element of its payment until standards improve. If standards do not improve after an agreed period, the public sector authority is usually entitled to terminate the contract, compensate the consortium where appropriate, and take ownership of the project.

Termination procedures are highly complex, as most projects are not able to secure private financing without assurances that the debt financing of the project will be repaid in the case of termination. In most termination cases the public sector is required to repay the debt and take ownership of the project. In practice, termination is considered a last resort only.

Whether public interest is at all protected by a particular PFI contract is highly dependent on how well or badly the contract was written and the determination (or not) and capacity of the contracting authority to enforce it. Many steps have been taken over the years to standardise the form of PFI contracts to ensure public interests are better protected.

=== Structure of providers ===
The typical PFI provider is organized into three parts or legal entities: a holding company (called "Topco") which is the same as the SPV mentioned above, a capital equipment or infrastructure provision company (called "Capco"), and a services or operating company (called "Opco"). The main contract is between the public sector authority and the Topco. Requirements then 'flow down' from the Topco to the Capco and Opco via secondary contracts. Further requirements then flow down to subcontractors, again with contracts to match. Often the main subcontractors are companies with the same shareholders as the Topco.

=== Method of funding ===
Prior to the 2008 financial crisis, large PFI projects were funded through the sale of bonds and/or senior debt. Since the crisis, funding by senior debt has become more common. Smaller PFI projects – the majority by number – have typically always been funded directly by banks in the form of senior debt. Senior debt is generally slightly more expensive than bonds, which the banks would argue is due to their more accurate understanding of the credit-worthiness of PFI deals – they may consider that monoline providers underestimate the risk, especially during the construction stage, and hence can offer a better price than the banks are willing to.

Refinancing of PFI deals is common. Once construction is complete, the risk profile of a project can be lower, so cheaper debt can be obtained. This refinancing might in the future be done via bonds – the construction stage is financed using bank debt, and then bonds for the much longer period of operation.

The banks who fund PFI projects are repaid by the consortium from the money received from the government during the lifespan of the contract. From the point of view of the private sector, PFI borrowing is considered low risk because public sector authorities are very unlikely to default. Indeed, under IMF rules, national governments are not permitted to go bankrupt (although this is sometimes ignored, as when Argentina 'restructured' its foreign debt). Repayment depends entirely on the ability of the consortium to deliver the services in accordance with the output specified in the contract.

Under guidance issued prior to the reform proposals initiated in December 2011, public sector partners were permitted to contribute up to 30% of the construction costs as a capital contribution, generally handed over at the end of the construction period and subject to appropriate risk transfer and performance regimes being in place. The government indicated in its reform consultation that allowance for higher levels of capital contribution was being considered, noting the some international practice also offered examples of higher levels of capital contribution.

=== Insurance ===
PFI contracts generally allocate risks to the private sector contractor, who takes out appropriate insurance to cover these risks and includes anticipated insurance costs in its PFI charges. However, it has been recognised that levels of insurance premium are variable following cyclical economic changes, and difficult to predict over the lifetime of a PFI project. PFI terms were amended in 2002 and standardised in 2006 to allow for insurance cost sharing mechanisms, whereby the client and contractor could share the risk of market fluctuation in insurance premium costs.

== History ==
=== Development ===
PFI was implemented in the UK by the Conservative Government led by John Major in 1992. It was introduced against the backdrop of the Maastricht Treaty which provided for European Economic and Monetary Union (EMU). To participate in EMU, EU member states were required to keep public debt below a certain threshold, and PFI was a mechanism to take debt off the government balance sheet and so meet the Maastricht convergence criteria. PFI immediately proved controversial, and was attacked by Labour critics such as the Shadow Chief Secretary to the Treasury Harriet Harman, who said that PFI was really a back-door form of privatisation (House of Commons, 7 December 1993), and the future Chancellor of the Exchequer, Alistair Darling, warned that "apparent savings now could be countered by the formidable commitment on revenue expenditure in years to come".

Initially, the private sector was unenthusiastic about PFI, and the public sector was opposed to its implementation. In 1993, the Chancellor of the Exchequer described its progress as "disappointingly slow". To help promote and implement the policy, he created the Private Finance Office within the Treasury, with a Private Finance Panel headed by Alastair Morton. These institutions were staffed with people linked with the City of London, and accountancy and consultancy firms who had a vested interest in the success of PFI. The largest of the early PFI projects was Pathway, announced by Peter Lilley in 1995, which was to automate the handling of benefit payments at post offices.

Two months after Tony Blair's Labour Party took office, the Health Secretary, Alan Milburn, announced that "when there is a limited amount of public-sector capital available, as there is, it's PFI or bust". PFI expanded considerably in 1996 and then expanded much further under Labour with the NHS (Private Finance) Act 1997, resulting in criticism from many trade unions, elements of the Labour Party, the Scottish National Party (SNP), and the Green Party, as well as commentators such as George Monbiot. Proponents of the PFI include the World Bank, the IMF and the Confederation of British Industry.

Both Conservative and Labour governments sought to justify PFI on the practical grounds that the private sector is better at delivering services than the public sector. This position has been supported by the UK National Audit Office with regard to certain projects. However, critics claim that many uses of PFI are ideological rather than practical; Dr. Allyson Pollock recalls a meeting with the then Chancellor of the Exchequer Gordon Brown who could not provide a rationale for PFI other than to "declare repeatedly that the public sector is bad at management, and that only the private sector is efficient and can manage services well."

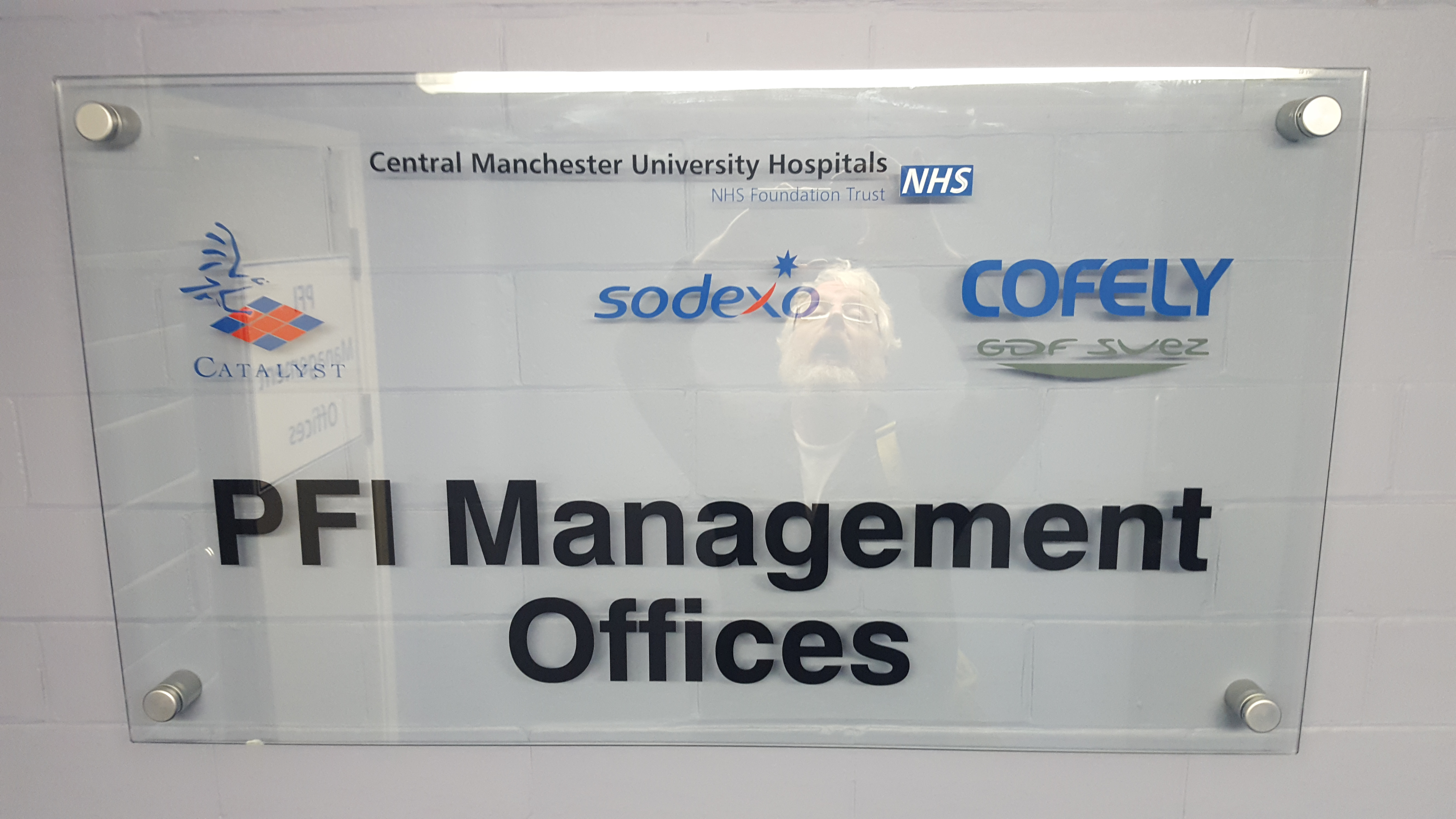
Sign on the door of Central Manchester University Hospitals NHS Foundation Trust

To better promote PFI, the Labour government appointed Malcolm Bates to chair the efforts to review the policy with a number of Arthur Andersen staffers. They recommended the creation of a Treasury Task Force (TTF) to train public servants into PFI practice and to coordinate the implementation of PFI. In 1998, the TTF was renamed to "Partnership UK" (PUK) and sold 51% of its share to the private sector. PUK was then chaired by Sir Derek Higgs, director of Prudential Insurance and chairman of British Land plc. These changes meant that the government transferred the responsibility of managing PFI to a corporation closely related with the owners, financiers, consultants, and subcontractors that stood to benefit from this policy. This created a strong appearance of conflict of interest.

Trade unions such as Unison and the GMB, which are Labour supporters, strongly opposed these developments. At the 2002 Labour Party Conference, the delegates adopted a resolution condemning PFI and calling for an independent review of the policy, which was ignored by the party leadership.

=== Implementation ===
In education, the first PFI school opened in 2000. In 2005/2006 the Labour Government introduced Building Schools for the Future, a scheme introduced for improving the infrastructure of Britain's schools. Of the £2.2 billion funding that the Labour government committed to BSF, £1.2 billion (55.5%) was to be covered by PFI credits. Some local authorities were persuaded to accept Academies in order to secure BSF funding in their area.

In 2003 the Labour Government used public-private partnership (PPP) schemes for the privatisation of London Underground's infrastructure and rolling stock. The two private companies created under the PPP, Metronet and Tube Lines were later taken into public ownership.

By October 2007 the total capital value of PFI contracts signed throughout the UK was £68bn, committing the British taxpayer to future spending of £215bn over the life of the contracts. The 2008 financial crisis presented PFI with difficulties because many sources of private capital had dried up. Nevertheless, PFI remained the UK government's preferred method for public sector procurement under Labour. In January 2009 the Labour Secretary of State for Health, Alan Johnson, reaffirmed this commitment with regard to the health sector, stating that "PFIs have always been the NHS’s 'plan A' for building new hospitals … There was never a 'plan B'". However, because of banks' unwillingness to lend money for PFI projects, the UK government now had to fund the so-called 'private' finance initiative itself. In March 2009 it was announced that the Treasury would lend £2bn of public money to private firms building schools and other projects under PFI. Labour's Chief Secretary to the Treasury, Yvette Cooper, claimed the loans should ensure that projects worth £13bn – including waste treatment projects, environmental schemes and schools – would not be delayed or cancelled. She also promised that the loans would be temporary and would be repaid at a commercial rate. But, at the time, Vince Cable of the Liberal Democrats, subsequently Secretary of State for Business in the coalition, argued in favour of traditional public financing structures instead of propping up PFI with public money:

The whole thing has become terribly opaque and dishonest and it's a way of hiding obligations. PFI has now largely broken down and we are in the ludicrous situation where the government is having to provide the funds for the private finance initiative.

In opposition at the time, even the Conservative Party considered that, with the taxpayer now funding it directly, PFI had become "ridiculous". Philip Hammond, subsequently Secretary of State for Transport in the coalition, said:

If you take the private finance out of PFI, you haven’t got much left . . . if you transfer the financial risk back to the public sector, then that has to be reflected in the structure of the contracts. The public sector cannot simply step in and lend the money to itself, taking more risk so that the PFI structure can be maintained while leaving the private sector with the high returns these projects can bring. That seems to us fairly ridiculous.

In an interview in November 2009, Conservative George Osborne, subsequently Chancellor of the Exchequer in the coalition, sought to distance his party from the excesses of PFI by blaming Labour for its misuse. At the time, Osborne proposed a modified PFI which would preserve the arrangement of private sector investment for public infrastructure projects in return for part-privatisation, but would ensure proper risk transfer to the private sector along with transparent accounting:

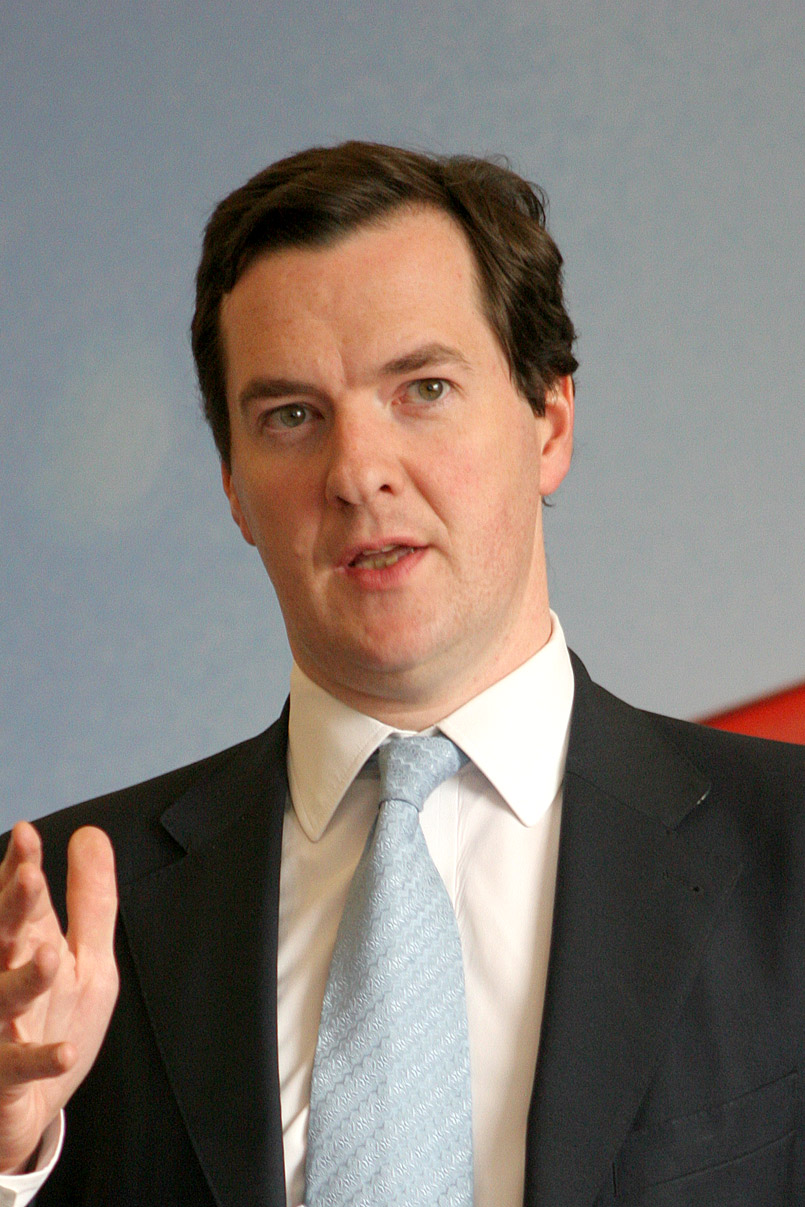
George Osborne

The government's use of PFI has become totally discredited, so we need new ways to leverage private-sector investment . . . Labour's PFI model is flawed and must be replaced. We need a new system that doesn't pretend that risks have been transferred to the private sector when they can't be, and that genuinely transfers risks when they can be . . . On PFI, we are drawing up alternative models that are more transparent and better value for taxpayers. The first step is transparent accounting, to remove the perverse incentives that result in PFI simply being used to keep liabilities off the balance sheet. The government has been using the same approach as the banks did, with disastrous consequences. We need a more honest and flexible approach to building the hospitals and schools the country needs. For projects such as major transport infrastructure we are developing alternative models that shift risk on to the private sector. The current system – heads the contractor wins, tails the taxpayer loses – will end.

Despite being so critical of PFI while in opposition and promising reform, once in power George Osborne progressed 61 PFI schemes worth a total of £6.9bn in his first year as Chancellor. According to Mark Hellowell from the University of Edinburgh:

The truth is the coalition government have made a decision that they want to expand PFI at a time when the value for money credentials of the system have never been weaker. The government is very concerned to keep the headline rates of deficit and debt down, so it's looking to use an increasingly expensive form of borrowing through an intermediary knowing the investment costs won't immediately show up on their budgets.

The high cost of PFI deals is a major issue, with advocates for renegotiating PFI deals in the face of reduced public sector budgets, or even for refusing to pay PFI charges on the grounds that they are a form of odious debt. Critics such as Peter Dixon argue that PFI is fundamentally the wrong model for infrastructure investment, saying that public sector funding is the way forward.

In November 2010 the UK government released spending figures showing that the current total payment obligation for PFI contracts in the UK was £267 billion. Research has also shown that in 2009 the Treasury failed to negotiate decent PFI deals with publicly owned banks, resulting in £1bn of unnecessary costs. This failure is particularly grave given the coalition's own admission in their national infrastructure plan that a 1% reduction in the cost of capital for infrastructure investment could save the taxpayer £5bn a year.

The Department for Environment, Food and Rural Affairs (DEFRA) withdrew funding support from seven waste management PFI projects as a result of the 2010 Spending Review, directing the cuts to those projects where least progress had been made with contract procurement and obtaining planning permission.

In February 2011 the Treasury announced a project to examine the £835m Queen's Hospital PFI deal. Once savings and efficiencies are identified, the hope - as yet unproven - is that the PFI consortium can be persuaded to modify its contract. The same process could potentially be applied across a range of PFI projects.

=== PF2 ===
In December, 2012 the Treasury published a White Paper outlining the results of a review of the PFI and proposals for change. These aimed to:

- centralise procurement by and for government departments, increase Treasury involvement in the procurement process, and move the management of all public sector investment in PFI schemes into a central unit in the Treasury;
- draw funding providers into projects at an earlier stage to reduce windfall gains when they were sold on;
- exclude "soft services" from PFI schemes where the specification was likely to change at short notice (such as catering and cleaning);
- reduce the role of bank debt in financing;
- improve transparency and accountability by both public and private sector participants;
- increase the proportion of risk carried by the public sector.

Under this "new approach", the government would become a minority equity co-investor in future projects, partly to better align the private and public sector interests in new projects. A consultation exercise was subsequently undertaken by the government regarding the terms on which the public sector stake would be managed, aiming for a generally consistent approach across projects but with scope for details to be finalised prior to operation to reflect any project-specific issues. The government's response to the consultation and the "Standard PF2 Equity Documents" were published in October 2013.

Under the Priority School Building Programme which was launched in 2014 by the Education and Skills Funding Agency, the rebuilding and/or refurbishment of 46 schools in England was funded and procured using the PF2 model.

=== Scotland ===
A specialist unit was set up within the Scottish Office in 2005 to handle PFI projects. In November 2014, Nicola Sturgeon announced a £409m public-private funding package which would be funded through a non-profit distributing model which would cap private sector returns, returning any surplus to the public sector. On Monday 11 April 2016, 17 PFI-funded schools in Edinburgh failed to open after the Easter break because of structural problems identified in two of them the previous Friday; the schools had been erected in the 1990s by Miller Construction.

=== Ending of PFI for new infrastructure projects ===
A January 2018 report by the National Audit Office found that the UK had incurred many billions of pounds in extra costs for no clear benefit through PFIs.

In October 2018, the Chancellor, Philip Hammond, announced that the UK Government will no longer use PF2, the current model of Private Finance Initiative, for new infrastructure projects, due to value-for-money considerations and the difficulties caused by the collapse of PFI construction company Carillion.

A Centre of Excellence was established within the Department of Health and Social Care to improve management of existing PFI contracts in the NHS.

== Examples of projects ==
There have been over 50 English hospitals procured under a PFI contract with capital cost exceeding £50 million:

Major English hospitals (with capital cost exceeding £50 million)
Financial close	Project name	Capital cost	Authority	References
1997	Darent Valley Hospital, Dartford	£94m	Dartford and Gravesham NHS Trust	
1997	Cumberland Infirmary, Carlisle	£65m	North Cumbria University Hospitals NHS Trust	
1998	Norfolk and Norwich University Hospital	£229m	Norfolk and Norwich University Hospitals NHS Foundation Trust	
1998	Calderdale Royal Hospital, Halifax	£103m	Calderdale and Huddersfield NHS Foundation Trust	
1998	Wythenshawe Hospital, Manchester	£113m	Manchester University NHS Foundation Trust	
1998	University Hospital of North Durham	£87m	County Durham and Darlington NHS Foundation Trust	
1998	Queen Elizabeth Hospital, Woolwich	£84m	Lewisham and Greenwich NHS Trust	
1998	Princess Royal University Hospital, Farnborough	£118m	King's College Hospital NHS Foundation Trust	
1999	Barnet Hospital	£54m	Royal Free London NHS Foundation Trust	
1999	Worcestershire Royal Hospital, Worcester	£85m	Worcestershire Acute Hospitals NHS Trust	
1999	Hereford County Hospital	£62m	Wye Valley NHS Trust	
1999	James Cook University Hospital, Middlesbrough	£96m	South Tees Hospitals NHS Foundation Trust	
1999	Great Western Hospital, Swindon	£148m	Great Western Hospitals NHS Foundation Trust	
2000	Golden Jubilee Wing, King's College Hospital, London	£50m	King's College Hospital NHS Foundation Trust	
2000	University College Hospital, London	£422m	University College London Hospitals NHS Foundation Trust	
2001	Russells Hall Hospital, Dudley	£137m	Dudley Group NHS Foundation Trust	
2001	West Middlesex University Hospital, Isleworth	£55m	Chelsea and Westminster Hospital NHS Foundation Trust	
2002	University Hospital Coventry	£440m	University Hospitals Coventry and Warwickshire NHS Trust	
2003	Central Middlesex Hospital, Park Royal	£60m	London North West Healthcare NHS Trust	
2003	Royal Derby Hospital	£333m	Derby Teaching Hospitals NHS Foundation Trust	
2003	West Wing, John Radcliffe Hospital, Oxford	£134m	Oxford University Hospitals NHS Foundation Trust	
2003	Royal Blackburn Teaching Hospital	£133m	East Lancashire Hospitals NHS Trust	
2004	Royal Manchester Children's Hospital	£500m	Central Manchester University Hospitals NHS Foundation Trust	
2004	Elective Care Facility, Addenbrooke's Hospital	£85m	Cambridge University Hospitals NHS Foundation Trust	
2004	St James's Institute of Oncology, Leeds	£265m	Leeds Teaching Hospitals NHS Trust	
2004	Queen Mary's Hospital, Roehampton	£55m	St George's University Hospitals NHS Foundation Trust	
2004	Riverside Building, University Hospital Lewisham	£58m	Lewisham and Greenwich NHS Trust	
2004	Queen's Hospital, Romford	£312m	Barking, Havering and Redbridge University Hospitals NHS Trust	
2005	King's Mill Hospital, Ashfield	£300m	Sherwood Forest Hospitals NHS Foundation Trust	
2005	Queen's Centre for Oncology and Haematology, Cottingham	£65m	North West Anglia NHS Foundation Trust	
2005	Northern Centre for Cancer Treatment, Newcastle upon Tyne	£150m	Newcastle upon Tyne Hospitals NHS Foundation Trust	
2005	Great North Children's Hospital, Newcastle upon Tyne	£150m	Newcastle upon Tyne Hospitals NHS Foundation Trust	
2005	Churchill Hospital, Oxford	£236m	Oxford University Hospitals NHS Foundation Trust	
2005	Queen Alexandra Hospital, Portsmouth	£236m	Portsmouth Hospitals NHS Trust	
2006	Whiston Hospital, Merseyside	£338m	St Helens and Knowsley Teaching Hospitals NHS Trust	
2006	Queen Elizabeth Hospital Birmingham	£545m	University Hospitals Birmingham NHS Foundation Trust	
2006	St Bartholomew's Hospital, London	£500m	Barts Health NHS Trust	
2006	Royal London Hospital	£650m	Barts Health NHS Trust	
2007	Peterborough City Hospital, Cambridgeshire	£336m	North West Anglia NHS Foundation Trust	
2007	North Middlesex University Hospital, Edmonton	£118m	North Middlesex University Hospital NHS Trus	
2007	Broomfield Hospital, Chelmsford	£180m	Mid Essex Hospital Services NHS Trust	
2007	Royal Stoke University Hospital	£370m	University Hospitals of North Midlands NHS Trust	
2007	Walsall Manor Hospital, West Midlands	£174m	Walsall Healthcare NHS Trust	
2007	Roseberry Park Hospital, Middlesbrough	£75m	Tees, Esk and Wear Valleys NHS Foundation Trust	
2007	Tameside General Hospital	£78m	Tameside and Glossop Integrated Care NHS Foundation Trust	
2007	Pinderfields Hospital, Wakefield	£150m	Mid Yorkshire Hospitals NHS Trust	
2007	Pontefract Hospital	£150m	Mid Yorkshire Hospitals NHS Trust	
2007	Salford Royal Hospital	£136m	Salford Royal NHS Foundation Trust	
2008	Tunbridge Wells Hospital	£230m	Maidstone and Tunbridge Wells NHS Trust	
2010	Southmead Hospital, Bristol	£430m	North Bristol NHS Trust	
2013	Alder Hey Children's Hospital, Liverpool	£187m	Alder Hey Children's NHS Foundation Trust	
2013	Royal Liverpool University Hospital	£429m	Royal Liverpool and Broadgreen University Hospitals NHS Trust	
2015	Royal Papworth Hospital, Cambridgeshire	£165m	Royal Papworth Hospital NHS Foundation Trust	
2016	Midland Metropolitan University Hospital, Smethwick	£297m	Sandwell and West Birmingham Hospitals NHS Trust	

There have been some six Scottish hospitals procured under a PFI contract with capital cost exceeding £50 million:

Major Scottish hospitals (with capital cost exceeding £50 million)
Financial close	Project name	Capital cost	Authority	References
1998	Royal Infirmary of Edinburgh	£180m	NHS Lothian	
1998	University Hospital Wishaw, North Lanarkshire	£100m	NHS Lanarkshire	
1998	University Hospital Hairmyres, South Lanarkshire	£68m	NHS Lanarkshire	
2006	Stobhill Hospital, Glasgow	£100m	NHS Greater Glasgow and Clyde	
2007	Forth Valley Royal Hospital, Falkirk	£300m	NHS Forth Valley	
2009	Victoria Hospital, Kirkcaldy	£170m	NHS Fife	

The following is a selection of major projects in other sectors procured under a PFI contract:

Some major projects in other sectors
Financial close	Project name	Capital cost	Authority	Sector	References
1996	Pathway (benefit payments at post offices)	£1.5b	Department of Social Security	Central Government	
1998	National Physical Laboratory, Teddington	£96m	Department of Trade & Industry	Central Government	
2000	GCHQ New Accommodation, Cheltenham	£330m	Government Communications Headquarters	Intelligence	
2000	Ministry of Defence Main Building, London	£531m	Ministry of Defence	Central Government	
2000	HM Treasury Building, London	£140m	HM Treasury	Central Government	
2001	The STEPS Contract	£370m	Inland Revenue	Central Government	
2003	Skynet 5	£1.4bn	Ministry of Defence	Defence	
2004	Colchester Garrison	£540m	British Army	Defence	
2006	Northwood Headquarters	£150m	British Army	Defence	
2006	Project Allenby Connaught (various garrisons)	£1.6bn	British Army	Defence	
2008	Future Strategic Tanker Aircraft	£2.7bn	Royal Air Force	Defence	
2012	Streets Ahead, Sheffield	£369m	Sheffield City Council	Local Government – Highway Maintenance	

The Guardian published a full list of PFI contracts by department in July 2012, and HM Treasury published a full list of PFI contracts by department in March 2015.

== Impact ==
=== Analysis ===
A study by HM Treasury in July 2003 was supportive, showing that the only deals in its sample which were over budget were those where the public sector changed its mind after deciding what it wanted and from whom it wanted it.

A later report by the National Audit Office in 2009 found that 69 per cent of PFI construction projects between 2003 and 2008 were delivered on time and 65 per cent were delivered at the contracted price.

However, a report by the National Audit Office in 2011 was much more critical, finding that the use of PFI "has the effect of increasing the cost of finance for public investments relative to what would be available to the government if it borrowed on its own account" and "the price of finance is significantly higher with a PFI."

An article in The Economist reports that:

Getting the private sector to build and run prisons has brought tangible benefits. One is speed: private jails are built in as little as two years, rather than the seven that they used to take when the government did the building. Running costs are lower too, mainly because staff are paid a quarter less than in the public sector (though senior managers are paid more) and get fewer benefits.

On the other hand, Monbiot argues that the specifications of many public infrastructure projects have been distorted to increase their profitability for PFI contractors.

PFI projects allowed the Ministry of Defence to gain many useful resources "on a shoestring"; PFI deals were signed for barracks, headquarters buildings, training for pilots and sailors, and an aerial refuelling service, amongst other things.

Individuals have speculated that some PFI projects have been shoddily specified and executed. For example, in 2005 a confidential government report condemned the PFI-funded Newsam Centre at Seacroft Hospital for jeopardising the lives of 300 patients and staff. The Newsam Centre is for people with lifelong learning difficulties and the mentally ill. The report said that there were shortcomings "in each of the five key areas of documentation, design, construction, operation and management" at the hospital, which cost £47m. Between 2001 and 2005 there were four patient suicides, including one which was left undiscovered for four days in an out-of-order bathroom. The coroner said that Leeds Mental Health Teaching NHS Trust, which is responsible for the facility, had failed to keep patients under proper observation. The government report said that the design and construction of the building did not meet the requirements for a facility for mental patients. The building has curving corridors which make patient observation and quick evacuation difficult. The report said that the building also constituted a fire hazard, as it was constructed without proper fire protection materials in the wall and floor joints. In addition, mattresses and chairs used below-standard fire-retardant materials. Patients were allowed to smoke in rooms where they could not be easily observed. The fire-safety manual was described as "very poor", and the fire-safety procedure consisted of a post-it note marked "to be provided by the Trust". The report concluded that "every section of the fire safety code" had been breached.

On the other hand, the building of two new PFI Police Stations on behalf of Kent Police serving the Medway area and the North Kent area (Gravesend and Dartford) is credited as a successful PFI project. Supporters say that the new buildings take into account the modern needs of the police better than the 60s/70s building, and that another advantage is that the old buildings can be sold for income or redeveloped into the police estate.

=== Education ===
KPMG investigations in 2008 and 2009 found that school renewals had beneficial impacts on educational outcomes and that the rate of improvement was higher in PFI schools than where construction or renewal was conventionally funded.

=== National Health Service (NHS) ===
In 2017 there were 127 PFI schemes in the English NHS. The contracts vary greatly in size. Most include the cost of running services such as facilities management, hospital portering and patient food, and these amount to around 40% of the cost. Total repayments will cost around £2.1 billion in 2017 and will reach a peak in 2029. This is around 2% of the NHS budget.

A 2009 study by University College London, studying data at hospitals built since 1995, supports the argument that private-sector providers are more accountable to provide quality services: It showed that hospitals operating under PFI have better patient environment ratings than conventionally funded hospitals of similar age. The PFI hospitals also have higher cleanliness scores than non-PFI hospitals of similar age, according to data collected by the NHS.

Jonathan Fielden, chair of the British Medical Association's consultants' committee has said that PFI debts are "distorting clinical priorities" and affecting the treatment given to patients. Fielden cited the example of University Hospital Coventry where the NHS Trust was forced to borrow money to make the first £54m payment owed to the PFI contractor. He said that the trust was in the ignominious position of struggling for money before the hospital's doors even opened. The trust could not afford to run all the services that it had commissioned and was having to mothball services and close wards.

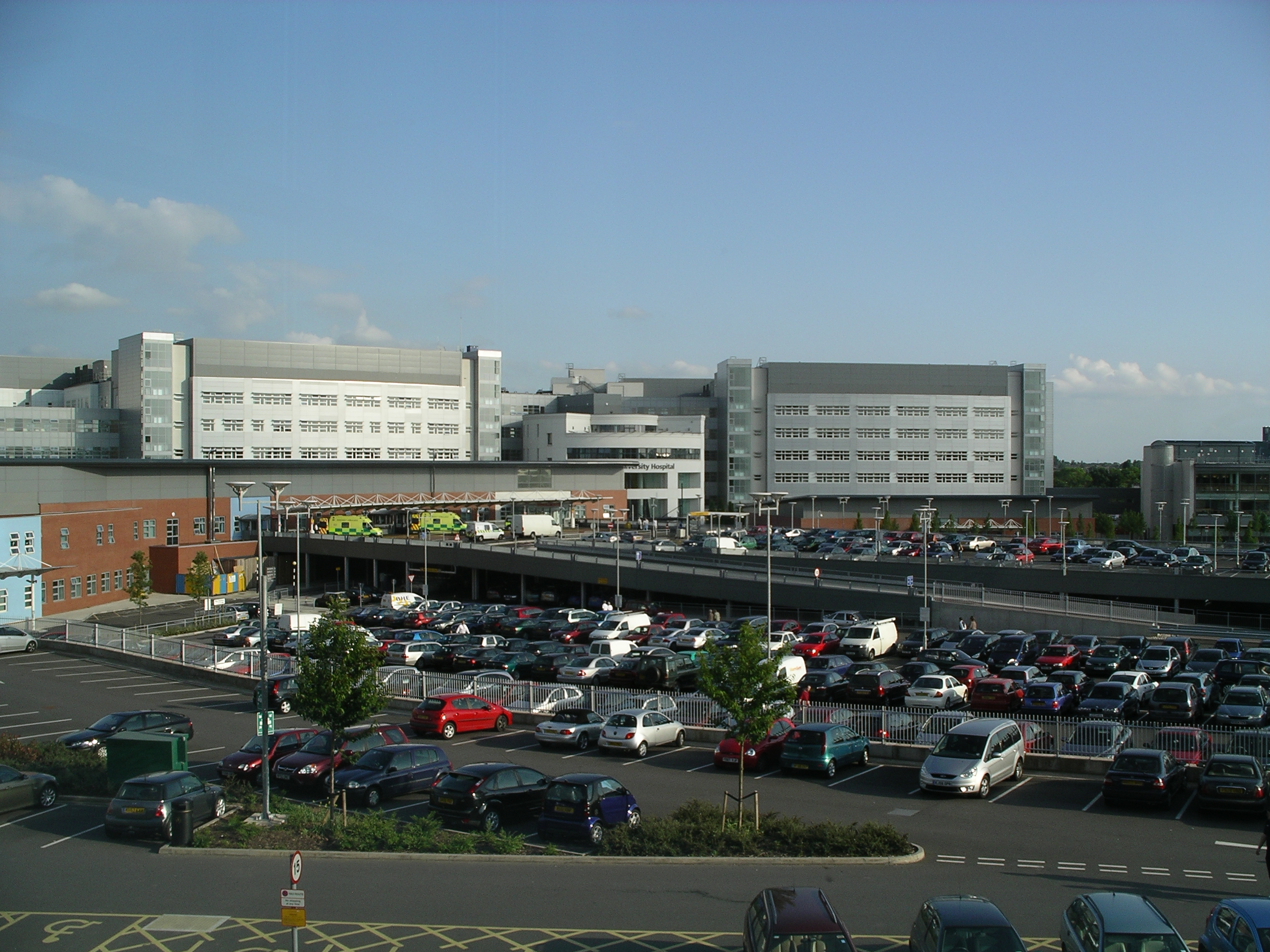
University Hospital Coventry

The high cost of hospitals built under PFI is forcing service cuts at neighbouring hospitals built with public money. Overspending at the PFI-funded Worcestershire Royal Hospital has put a question mark over services at neighbouring hospitals. A strategic health authority paper in 2007 noted debts at two hospitals in south-east London: Princess Royal University Hospital and Queen Elizabeth Hospital. The paper attributed the debts in part to their high fixed PFI costs and suggested that the same would soon apply to Lewisham Hospital.

In 2012, seven NHS trusts were unable to meet the repayments for their private finance schemes and were given £1.5 billion in emergency funding, to help them avoid cutting patient services.

- Barking, Havering and Redbridge University Hospitals NHS Trust
- Dartford and Gravesham NHS Trust
- Maidstone and Tunbridge Wells NHS Trust
- North Cumbria University Hospitals NHS Trust
- Peterborough and Stamford Hospitals NHS Foundation Trust
- St Helens and Knowsley Teaching Hospitals NHS Trust
- South London Healthcare NHS Trust

Peter Dixon, Chairman of University College London Hospitals NHS Foundation Trust, with the largest PFI-built hospital in England, has gone on the record to say:

We now have indexed payments for the next 35 years which at a time of growing concern over NHS budgets can only be a millstone. It isn't just that our scheme was expensive. Its very existence distorts whatever else needs to happen in this part of London and beyond. And that is before we get to paying for the much larger scheme at Bart's and the London in a few years' time.

— Peter Dixon

The trust complained in July 2019 that inflexible Treasury rules were preventing it from buying out its 40-year PFI contract, which could deliver savings of £30 million a year. The contract equity holders are receiving around £20 million in annual dividends which is "double the figure envisaged at the start of the project and [is] projected to rise to £60m by the end of the deal".

An anonymous NHS finance director pointed out in November 2015, that PFI payments are often linked to the Retail Price Index which has risen more rapidly than the NHS tariff. He estimated that payments were about 3 percent higher than those incurred using traditional public dividend capital.

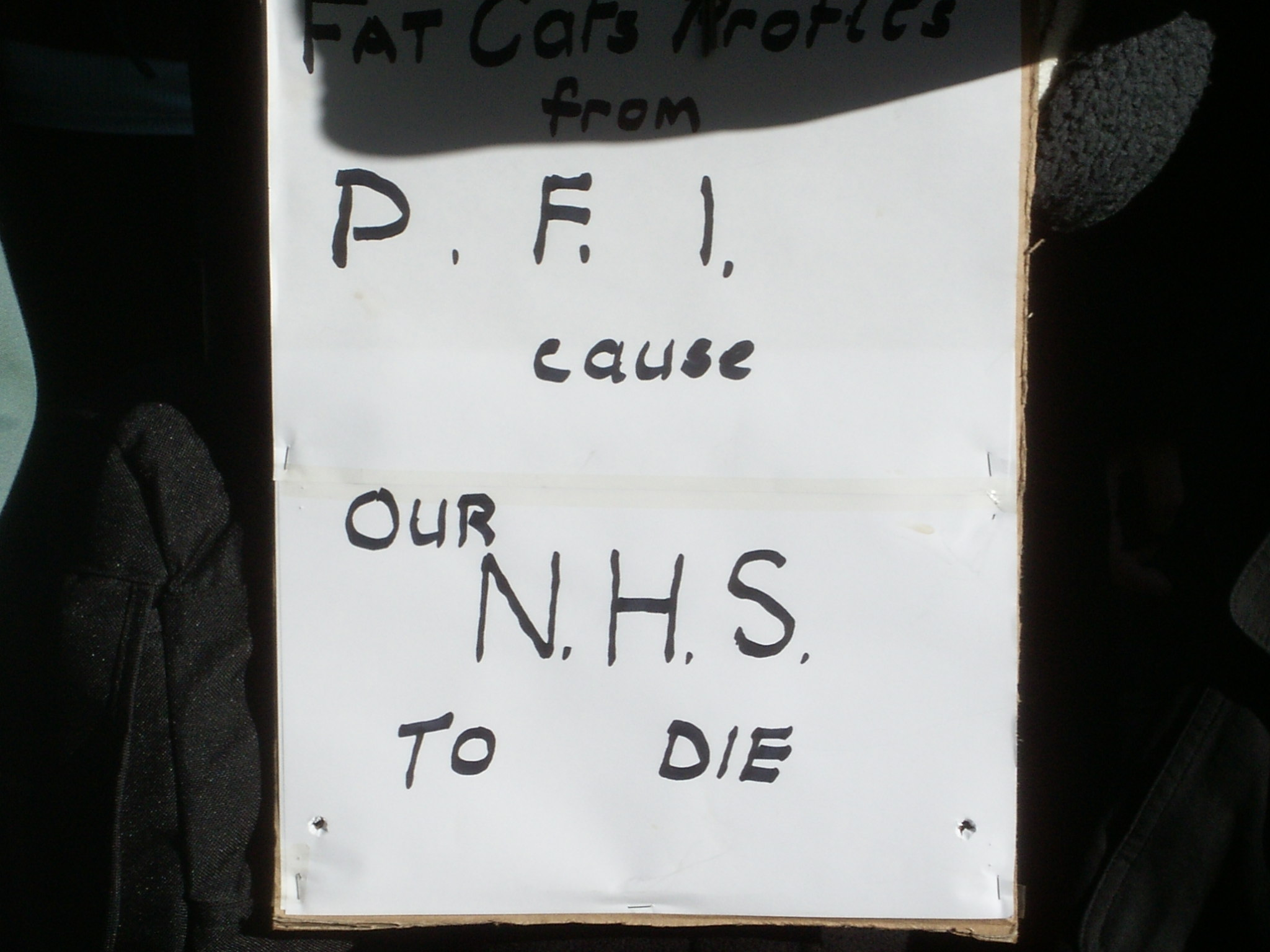
Demonstration, November 2006

Northumbria Healthcare NHS Foundation Trust was the first to buy out a PFI contract, borrowing £114.2 million from Northumbria County Council in a deal which reduced its costs by £3.5 million per year.

A report by the Centre for Health and the Public Interest in 2017 calculated that PFI companies had made pre-tax profits from the NHS of £831m in the previous six years. They calculate that PFI payments in the NHS will rise from £2.2 billion in 2019–20 to a peak of £2.7 billion in 2029–30.

=== Private sector ===
Semperian, Innisfree Ltd and the HICL Infrastructure Company are the main players in NHS contracts.

=== Employment ===
When spending is tight, hospitals may prefer to retain medical staff and services by spending less on building maintenance. But under PFI, hospitals are forced to prioritise the contractual payments for their buildings over jobs and, according to figures published by the Department of Health, these committed payments can account for up to 20% of operating budget. Nigel Edwards, head of policy for the NHS Confederation, noted that:

"A hospital with a PFI scheme [is] contractually bound to keep the maintenance up – and if you are spending 10 or 15 per cent on your buildings it means all the other efficiency and productivity gains you need have to come out of only 85 or 90 per cent of your budget."

Dr Jonathan Fielden, chair of the British Medical Association's consultants' committee has said that as a result of the high costs of a PFI scheme in Coventry "they are potentially reducing jobs". In fact by 2005 the hospital trust in Coventry was anticipating a deficit of £13m due to PFI and "drastic measures" were required to plug the gap including shutting one ward, removing eight beds from another, shortening the opening hours of the Surgical Assessment Unit, and the "rationalisation of certain posts" – which meant cutting 116 jobs.

Under PFI, many staff have their employment contracts automatically transferred to the private sector, using a process known as TUPE. In many cases this results in worse terms of employment and pension rights. Heather Wakefield, UNISON's national secretary for local government, has said:

Local authorities and health authorities have very good final-salary pension schemes. We have surveyed contractors in 'best value' [contracting out] deals. At only one company in the past three years was any pension provided. And that is the pattern [in transfers] across the public sector – not just in local government, and not just 'best value'. It happens in PFI too. TUPE does not apply to pensions. The Government is supposed to have revised TUPE, integrating the Acquired Rights Directive from the EU. That has not happened.

=== Debt ===
The debt created by PFI has a significant impact on the finances of public bodies. As of October 2007 the total capital value of PFI contracts signed throughout the UK was £68bn. However, central and local government are committed to paying a further £267bn over the lifetime of these contracts. To give regional examples, the £5.2bn of PFI investment in Scotland up to 2007 has created a public sector liability of £22.3bn and the investment of just £618m via PFI in Wales up to 2007 has created a public sector liability of £3.3bn. However, these debts are small compared to other public-sector liabilities.

Annual payments to the private owners of the PFI schemes are due to peak at £10bn in 2017. In some cases Trusts are having to 'rationalise' spending by closing wards and laying off staff, but they are not allowed to default on their PFI payments. As The Guardian explained "In September 1997 the government declared that these payments would be legally guaranteed: beds, doctors, nurses and managers could be sacrificed, but not the annual donation to the Fat Cats Protection League".

Mark Porter, of the British Medical Association said: "Locking the NHS into long-term contracts with the private sector has made entire local health economies more vulnerable to changing conditions. Now the financial crisis has changed conditions beyond recognition, so trusts tied into PFI deals have even less freedom to make business decisions that protect services, making cuts and closures more likely." John Appleby, chief economist at the King's Fund health think-tank, said:

"It is a bit like taking out a pretty big mortgage in the expectation your income is going to rise, but the NHS is facing a period where that is not going to happen. Money is being squeezed and the size of the repayments will make it harder for some to make the savings it needs to. I don't see why the NHS can't go back to its lenders to renegotiate the deals, just as we would with our own mortgages."

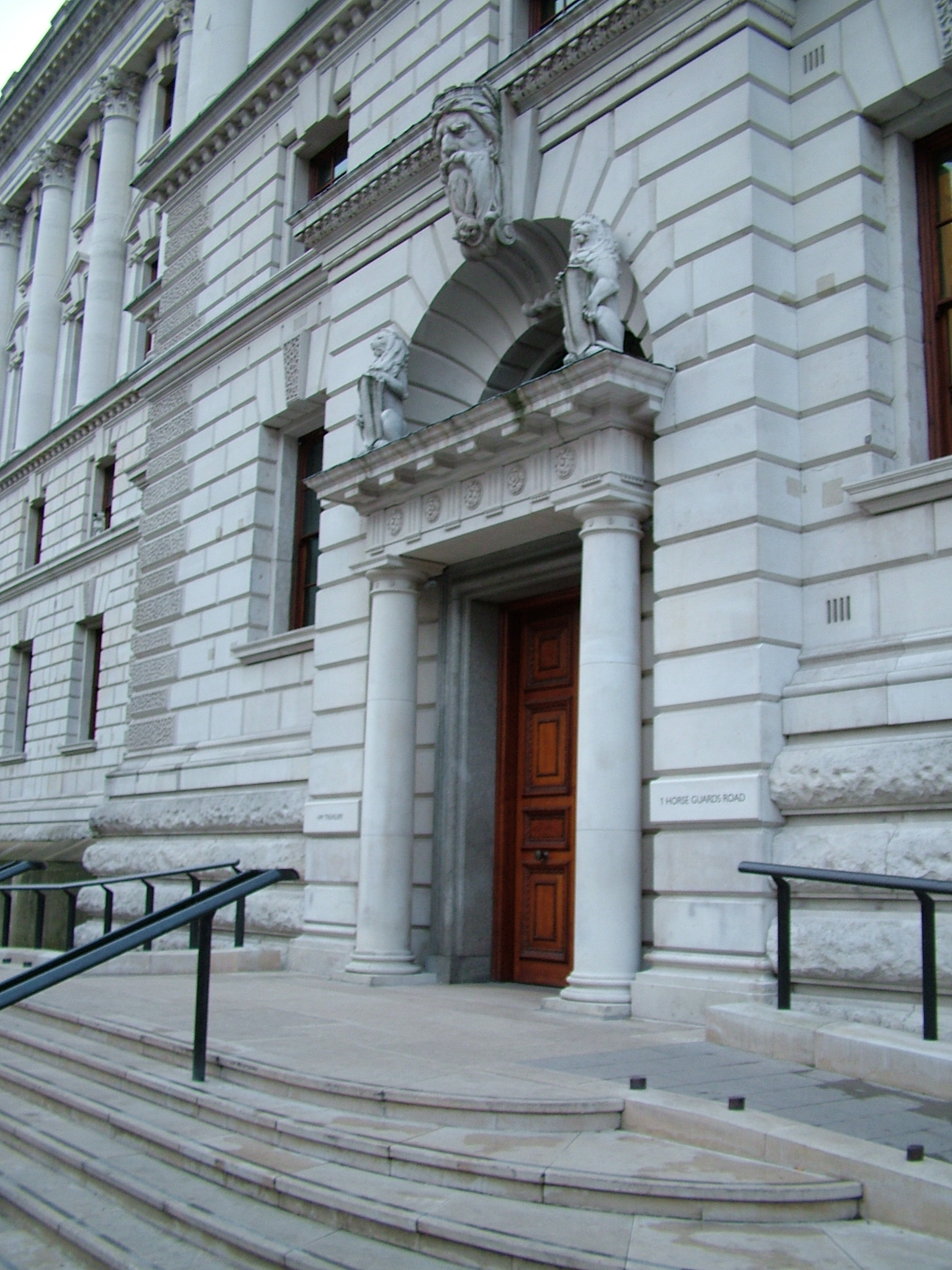
HM Treasury

Officials at the Treasury have also admitted that they may have to attempt to renegotiate certain PFI contracts in order to reduce payments, although it is far from certain that the private investors would accept this.

PFI contracts are generally off-balance-sheet, meaning that they do not show up as part of the national debt. This fiscal technicality has been characterized as a benefit and a flaw of PFI.

In the UK, the technical reason why PFI debts are off-balance-sheet is that the government authority taking out the PFI theoretically transfers one or more of the following risks to the private sector: risk associated with demand for the facility (e.g. under-utilisation); risk associated with construction of the facility (e.g. overspend and delay); or risk associated with the 'availability' of the facility. The PFI contract bundles the payment to the private sector as a single ('unitary') charge for both the initial capital spend and the ongoing maintenance and operation costs. Because of supposed risk transfer, the entire contract is deemed to be revenue rather than capital spending. As a result, no capital spend appears on the government's balance sheet (the revenue expenditure would not have been on the government balance sheet in any event). Public accounting standards are being changed to bring these numbers back onto the balance sheet. For example, in 2007 Neil Bentley, the CBI's Director of Public Services, told a conference that the CBI was keen for the government to press ahead with accounting rule changes that would put large numbers of PFI projects onto the government's books. He was concerned that accusations of "accounting tricks" were delaying PFI projects.

=== Risk ===
Supporters of PFI claim that risk is successfully transferred from public to private sectors as a result of PFI, and that the private sector is better at risk management. As an example of successful risk transfer they cite the case of the National Physical Laboratory. This deal ultimately caused the collapse of the building contractor Laser (a joint venture between Serco and John Laing) when the cost of the complex scientific laboratory, which was ultimately built, was very much larger than estimated.

On the other hand, Allyson Pollock argues that in many PFI projects risks are not in fact transferred to the private sector and, based on the research findings of Pollock and others, George Monbiot argues that the calculation of risk in PFI projects is highly subjective, and is skewed to favour the private sector:

When private companies take on a PFI project, they are deemed to acquire risks the state would otherwise have carried. These risks carry a price, which proves to be remarkably responsive to the outcome you want. A paper in the British Medical Journal shows that before risk was costed, the hospital schemes it studied would have been built much more cheaply with public funds. After the risk was costed, they all tipped the other way; in several cases by less than 0.1%.

Following an incident in the Royal Infirmary of Edinburgh where surgeons were forced to continue a heart operation in the dark following a power cut caused by PFI operating company Consort, Dave Watson from Unison criticised the way the PFI contract operates:

It's a costly and inefficient way of delivering services. It's meant to mean a transfer of risk, but when things go wrong the risk stays with the public sector and, at the end of the day, the public, because the companies expect to get paid. The health board should now be seeking an exit from this failed arrangement with Consort and at the very least be looking to bring facilities management back in-house.

In February 2019 the Healthcare Safety Investigation Branch produced a report into mistakes involving piped air being mistakenly supplied to patients rather than piped oxygen and said that cost pressures could make it difficult for trusts to respond to safety alerts because of the financial costs of replacing equipment. Private finance initiative contracts increased those costs and exacerbated the problem.

=== Value for money ===
A National Audit Office study in 2003 endorsed the view that PFI projects represent good value for taxpayers' money, but some commentators have criticised PFI for allowing excessive profits for private companies at the expense of the taxpayer. An investigation by Professor Jean Shaoul of Manchester Business School into the profitability of PFI deals based on accounts filed at Companies House revealed that the rate of return for the companies on twelve large PFI Hospitals was 58%. Excessive profits can be made when PFI projects are refinanced. An article in the Financial Times recalls the

acute embarrassment of the early days of PFI, when investors in projects made millions of pounds from refinancings and it turned out that the taxpayer had no right to any share in the gains ... Investors in one of the early prison projects, for example, made a £14m windfall gain and hugely increased rates of return when they used falling interest rates to refinance.

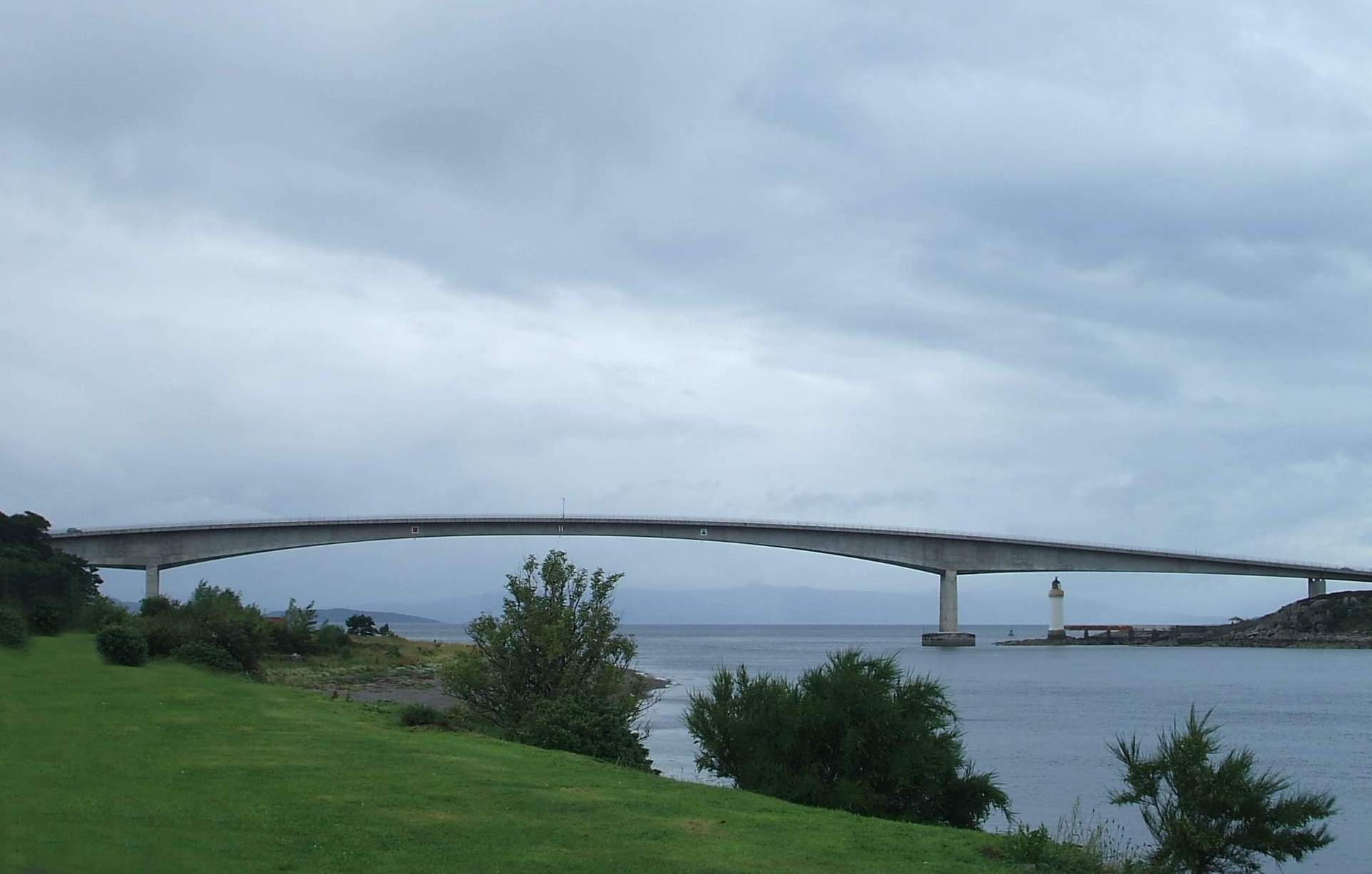
The Skye Bridge

While it is a catchy term, it is unclear what "value-for-money" means in practice and technical detail. A Scottish auditor once called it "technocratic mumbo-jumbo". A number of PFI projects have cost considerably more than originally anticipated. The duplication of design costs when each bidder in the latter stages of project procurement is preparing its own design was the subject of some criticism: the Royal Institute of British Architects (RIBA) put forward a model known as "Smart PFI" in 2005, under which a traditionally appointed design team would prepare "example plans" which would be finalised and costed by PFI bidders.

More recent reports indicate that PFI represents poor value for money. A treasury select committee stated that 'PFI was no more efficient than other forms of borrowing and it was "illusory" that it shielded the taxpayer from risk'.

One key criticism of PFI, when it comes to value for money, is the lack of transparency surrounding individual projects. This means that independent attempts, such as that by the Association for Consultancy and Engineering, to assess PFI data across government departments have been able to find significant variations in the costs to the taxpayer.

=== Tax ===
Some PFI deals have also been associated with tax avoidance, including a deal to sell properties belonging to the UK government's own tax authority. The House of Commons Public Accounts Committee criticised HM Revenue and Customs over the PFI STEPS deal to sell about 600 properties to a company called Mapeley, based in the tax haven of Bermuda. The committee said it was "a very serious blow indeed" for the government's own tax-collecting services to have entered into the contract with Mapeley, whom they described as "tax avoiders". Conservative MP Edward Leigh said there were "significant weaknesses" in the way the contract was negotiated. The government agencies had failed to clarify Mapeley's tax plans until a late stage in the negotiations. Leigh said: "It is incredible that the Inland Revenue, of all departments, did not, during contract negotiations, find out more about Mapeley's structure".

=== Bureaucracy ===
The National Audit Office has accused the government's PFI dogma of ruining a £10bn Ministry of Defence project. The Future Strategic Tanker Aircraft project to develop a fleet of multi-role RAF tanker and passenger aircraft was delayed for over 5 years while, in the meantime, old and unreliable planes continue to be used for air-to-air refuelling, and for transporting troops to and from Afghanistan. Edward Leigh, then Conservative chair of the Public Accounts Committee which oversees the work of the NAO, said: "By introducing a private finance element to the deal, the MoD managed to turn what should have been a relatively straightforward procurement into a bureaucratic nightmare". The NAO criticised the MoD for failing to carry out a "sound evaluation of alternative procurement routes" because there had been the "assumption" in the ministry that the aircraft must be provided through a PFI deal in order to keep the numbers off the balance sheet, due to "affordability pressures and the prevailing policy to use PFI wherever possible".

==== Complexity ====
Critics claim that the complexity of many PFI projects is a barrier to accountability. For example, a report by the Trade Union UNISON entitled "What is Wrong with PFI in Schools?" says:

LEAs often seek to withhold crucially important financial information about matters such as affordability and value for money. In addition, the complexity of many PFI projects means that governors, teachers and support staff are often asked to "take on trust" assurances about proposals which have important implications for them.

Malcolm Trobe, the President of the Association of School and College Leaders has said that the idea that contracting out the school building process via PFI would free up head teachers to concentrate on education has turned out to be a myth. In many cases it has in fact increased the workload on already stretched staff.

=== Waste ===
A BBC Radio 4 investigation into PFI noted the case of Balmoral High School in Northern Ireland which cost £17m to build in 2002. In 2007 the decision was made to close the school because of lack of pupils. But the PFI contract is due to run for another 20 years, so the taxpayer will be paying millions of pounds for an unused facility.

With regard to hospitals, Prof. Nick Bosanquet of Imperial College London has argued that the government commissioned some PFI hospitals without a proper understanding of their costs, resulting in a number of hospitals which are too expensive to be used. He said:

There are already one or two PFI hospitals where wards and wings are standing empty because nobody wants to buy their services. There will be a temptation to say 'right we are stuck with these contracts so we will close down older hospitals', which may in fact be lower cost. Just closing down non-PFI hospitals in order to up activity in the PFI ones is not going to be the answer because we may have the wrong kind of services in the wrong places.

In 2012, it was reported that dozens of NHS Trusts labouring under PFI-related debts were at risk of closure.

According to Stella Creasy, a self-acknowledged PFI "nerd", the fundamental problem was the rate of interest charged because of a lack of competition between providers. "Barts was a £1bn project. They’ll pay back £7bn. That is not good value for money". She wants to see a windfall tax on the PFI companies.

== Relationship with government ==
=== Treasury ===
In July 1997 a PFI taskforce was established within the Treasury to provide central co-ordination for the roll-out of PFI. Known as the Treasury Taskforce (TTF), its main responsibilities are to standardise the procurement process and train staff throughout government in the ways of PFI, especially in the private finance units of other government departments. The TTF initially consisted of a policy arm staffed by five civil servants, and a projects section employing eight private sector executives led by Adrian Montague, formally co-head of Global Project Finance at investment bank Dresdner Kleinwort Benson. In 1999 the policy arm was moved to the Office of Government Commerce (OGC), but it was subsequently moved back to the Treasury. The projects section was part-privatised and became Partnerships UK (PUK). The Treasury retained a 49% 'golden share', while the majority stake in PUK was owned by private sector investors. PUK was then staffed almost entirely by private sector procurement specialists such as corporate lawyers, investment bankers, consultants and so forth. It took the lead role in evangelising PFI and its variants within government, and was in control of the policy's day-to-day implementation.

In March 2009, in the face of funding difficulties caused by the 2008 financial crisis, the Treasury established an Infrastructure Finance Unit with a mandate to ensure the continuation of PFI projects. In April 2009, the unit stumped up £120m of public money to ensure that a new waste disposal project in Manchester would go ahead. Andy Rose, the unit head, said: "This is what we were set up to do, to get involved where private sector capital is not available." In May 2009 the unit proposed to provide £30m to bail out a second PFI project, a £700m waste treatment plant in Wakefield. In response, Tony Travers, Director of the Greater London Group at the London School of Economics described the use of public money to finance PFI as "Alice in Wonderland economics".

The House of Commons Public Accounts Committee has criticised the Treasury for failing to negotiate better PFI funding deals with banks in 2009. The committee revealed that British taxpayers are liable for an extra £1bn because the Treasury failed to find alternative ways to fund infrastructure projects during the 2008 financial crisis. The committee "suggests that the government should have temporarily abandoned PFI to directly fund some projects, instead of allowing the banks – many of which were being bailed out with billions of pounds of public money at the time – to increase their charges . . . by up to 33%".

=== Scrutiny ===
The House of Commons Liaison Committee has said that claims of commercial confidentiality are making it difficult for MPs to scrutinise the growing number of PFI contracts in the UK. The National Audit Office (NAO) is responsible for scrutinising public spending throughout the UK on behalf of the British Parliament and is independent of Government. It provides reports on the value for money of many PFI transactions and makes recommendations. The Public Accounts Committee also provides reports on these issues at a UK-wide level. The devolved governments of Scotland, Wales and Northern Ireland have their own equivalents of the NAO such as the Wales Audit Office and the Northern Ireland Audit Office which review PFI projects in their respective localities. In recent years the Finance Committees of the Scottish Parliament and the National Assembly for Wales have held enquiries into whether PFI represents good value for money.

=== Local government ===
PFI is used in both central and local government. In the case of local government projects, the capital element of the funding which enables the local authority to pay the private sector for these projects is given by central government in the form of what are known as PFI "credits". The local authority then selects a private company to perform the work, and transfers detailed control of the project, and in theory the risk, to the company.

In 2000, South Gloucestershire Council used PFI for household waste and recycling services, selecting private company Suez to deliver these services for 25 years.

=== Appraisal process ===
Jeremy Colman, former deputy general of the National Audit Office and Auditor General for Wales is quoted in the Financial Times saying that many PFI appraisals suffer from "spurious precision" and others are based on "pseudo-scientific mumbo-jumbo". Some, he says, are simply "utter rubbish". He noted government pressures on contracting authorities to weight their appraisals in favour of taking their projects down the PFI route: "If the answer comes out wrong you don't get your project. So the answer doesn't come out wrong very often."

In a paper published in the British Medical Journal, a team consisting of two public health specialists and an economist concluded that many PFI appraisals do not correctly calculate the true risks involved. They argued that the appraisal system is highly subjective in its evaluation of risk transferral to the private sector. An example was an NHS project where the risk that clinical cost savings might not be achieved was theoretically transferred to the private sector. In the appraisal this risk was valued at £5m but in practice the private contractor had no responsibility for ensuring clinical cost-savings and faced no penalty if there were none. Therefore, the supposed risk transfer was in fact spurious.
