= Section 114 notice =

British local authority financial notice

A section 114 notice is a report issued by the chief financial officer (or Section 151 officer) of a British public body to prevent certain types of expenditure. It takes its name from section 114 of the Local Government Finance Act 1988 (c. 41).

The most common type of notice is made under section 114(3), which restricts all spending except for that which funds statutory services. Despite the fact that local authorities in the United Kingdom cannot go bankrupt, issuing a section 114 notice is often described in the media as a council effectively declaring bankruptcy. Most councils under a section 114 notice will then pass a new budget to introduce cuts and reduce spending.

Amongst other instances, section 114 notices have been issued by Hackney Council in 2000, Northamptonshire Council twice in 2018, Croydon Council in 2020 and 2022, Slough Council in 2021, Thurrock Council in 2022, and Woking Borough Council and Birmingham City Council in 2023.

== Legal basis ==
Notices can be made under several parts of section 114 of the Local Government Finance Act 1988 (c. 41), with the different types of notice having different effects:

- Section 114(2): A notice must be made when the council or someone acting on its behalf has incurred (or is going to incur) unlawful expenditure.
- Section 114A(2): A notice must be made when the council's cabinet or someone acting on its behalf has incurred (or is going to incur) unlawful expenditure.
- Section 114(3): A notice must be made when the predicted expenditure of the council during a financial year is likely to exceed its available funds.

The first two types of notice target specific spending and have to be made in consultation with the head of paid service (commonly referred to as a council's 'chief executive') and the monitoring officer. The notice will suspend any relevant expenditure until the decision has been considered by the council (for Section 114(2) notices) or the cabinet (for Section 114A(2) notices), at which point the suspension ends.

The third type of notice, made under section 114(3), is the most commonly issued and can be made by the chief finance officer without consulting other council leaders. Once a notice has been issued, no new expenditure is permitted except to fund statutory services although existing commitments and contracts are honoured and staff wages are paid. Councillors must then meet within 21 days to discuss the situation and consider what action to take; once the notice has been considered, spending controls end. Although the original notice may end, if the council does not address the problem another notice may be issued, such as in Croydon in 2020.

== Instances of use ==
Council	Date issued	Party control	References
Brent London Borough Council	6 December 1988	Labour	
Lambeth London Borough Council	3 July 1989	Labour	(Note: Exceptionally, this notice was issued to force councillors to authorise finances for the poll tax, not for unlawful spending or financial distress.)
Camden London Borough Council	11 November 1992	Labour	
Hillingdon London Borough Council	5 July 2000	No overall control	
Hackney London Borough Council	17 October 2000	No overall control	
Milton Keynes Council	November 2002	Liberal Democrat	(Note: This notice was issued to prevent unlawful spending rather than because of financial distress.)
Northamptonshire County Council	2 February 2018	Conservative	
Northamptonshire County Council	24 July 2018	Conservative	
Croydon London Borough Council	11 November 2020	Labour	
Croydon London Borough Council	2 December 2020	Labour	
Slough Borough Council	2 July 2021	Labour	
Nottingham City Council	15 December 2021	Labour	
Croydon London Borough Council	22 November 2022	No overall control	
Thurrock Council	19 December 2022	Conservative	
Woking Borough Council	7 June 2023	Liberal Democrat	(Note: Woking was Conservative controlled from 2007-2022 which is when the risky investments took place.)
Birmingham City Council	5 September 2023	Labour	
Nottingham City Council	29 November 2023	Labour	

=== Hackney London Borough Council, 2000 ===
Hackney London Borough Council issued a section 114 notice on 17 October 2000, predicting that it would have a £15.5m hole in its finances by the end of the financial year. Budget cuts of around £4.5m were needed for the 2000-2001 financial year and £18m for the 2001-2002 year.

The council's managing director Max Caller, who had started the job that June, blamed the financial situation on previous mismanagement by council officers. A 1997 policy called 'Transforming Hackney' had removed centralised financial management in favour of budgets being set by individual council officials which, according to Jay Rayner, left the council "at the mercy of legions of incompetent council officials". Caller also said that council workers had "not understood, ignored or subverted" previous cost-cutting measures, such as a resolution that no more permanent staff should be employed. In September 1999, the council had had to implement an internal spending moratorium in order to manage that year's budget deficit.

The council's revenue and benefits department and its waste management service were both running deficits of £3m and transport services were £600,000 over budget. Almost half of the council's overall deficit was also caused by the fact that the it had passed its budget on the assumption that 96% of council tax would be collected; instead the collection rate was around 65%.

Urgent budget cuts were approved on 6 November 2000 and involved cutting back on temporary staff and overtime and car allowances. In December 2000, the council agreed on a three-year proposal to improve its finances. The plan led to £4m of cuts for the 2000-2001 financial year and £16m of cuts for 2001–2002. Further cuts were projected at £9m for 2001–2002, £10m for 2002-2003 and £11m for 2003–2004.

=== Northamptonshire County Council, 2018 ===
==== First notice ====
Northamptonshire County Council issued a section 114 notice on 2 February 2018, saying that there was a "significant risk" that the council would not be able to balance its budget for the 2017/18 financial year and could end up with a £10m deficit. Expected savings of £27m that had been forecast for the year did not appear, exacerbating the situation. Sajid Javid, the then-Secretary of State for Housing, Communities and Local Government, had opened an independent investigation into the council's finances in January 2018 after the council had announced the previous month that it would seek to increase council tax by 5% and pursue £34.3m of cuts.

The Chartered Institute of Public Finance and Accountancy said that the notice was "not surprising" due to general financial strain upon local government, budget pressures from Northamptonshire's education sector and its growing elderly population, and the county's 'transformation programme' which depleted savings reserves.

==== Second notice ====
In July 2018, the council issued a second section 114 notice after a projected budget deficit of between £60m and £70m for the 2018/19 financial year was uncovered. Mark McLaughlin, the council's outgoing finance officer, said that the council had "no financial resilience".

The council announced that it was set to lift the section 114 notice in March 2019, with council leader Matt Golby saying that they had "built stability back into the council's finances".

=== Croydon London Borough Council, 2020 and 2022 ===
==== First notice ====
Croydon London Borough Council issued a section 114 notice on 11 November 2020. It was reported that the council looked like it would overspend by £60m by the end of the year and that it had debts of £1.5bn. The notice had been drafted in early September 2020 but had not been formally issued due to ongoing conversations with the Ministry for Housing, Communities, and Local Government over a possible solution.

Croydon's finance director Lisa Taylor had warned in August 2020 that it could not be guaranteed that the council would avoid bankruptcy. In October 2020, Secretary of State Robert Jenrick had launched a review into the council's finances, saying the situation was "deeply concerning". The council's CEO Jo Negrini had resigned in August and the council's leader Tony Newman, deputy leader Alison Butler and its cabinet member for finance Simon Hall had all resigned in October.

Croydon's external auditors Grant Thornton had highlighted the council's "deteriorating financial resilience" due to increased costs of adult and children's social care and low levels of reserves. Risky investments were also blamed as a cause of the council's financial problems. The council had borrowed £545m to invest in property, including £30m in the Croydon Park Hotel and £46m on the Colonnades retail park. Both the hotel and the retail park were forced to close due to COVID-19 pandemic restrictions which reduced the income the council received from them and the Croydon Park Hotel fell into administration in June 2020.

The council prepared to reduce services to the bare legal minimum, focusing on providing social care and waste collection services. Cuts were expected for the borough's 13 libraries and nine children's centres and 35 buildings owned by the council were to be shut or sold off. It also announced it had asked the government for a £134m loan to stabilise its finances as it produced a three-year plan towards budget sustainability.

==== Second notice ====
A second section 114 notice was issued on 2 December 2020 after councillors met the day before (as required by the initial notice) but failed to agree a suitably balanced budget. Taylor stated that "without external support ... it will now be impossible for a balanced budget to be delivered" in the 2020/21 financial year and predicted an overspend of £66m.

==== Third notice ====
After the 2022 council election, the council moved to no overall control being led by new Mayor of Croydon Jason Perry. The council issued a third notice on 22 November 2022 due to a projected £130m budget deficit.

In February 2023, Croydon was given permission by central government to increase council tax by 15%, 10 percentage points over the normal raise cap of 5%. In March 2023, it was announced that the Department for Levelling Up, Housing and Communities was proposing intervention to put the council into special measures. The intervention did not mean that government commissioners would take over the day-to-day running of the council; instead, management decisions would be subject to strict oversight from a government appointed panel. The proposals were put into place on 20 July 2023 when Secretary of State Michael Gove used powers under the Local Government Act 1999 to give Croydon's Improvement and Assurance Panel a statutory footing, allowing the panel to direct rather than guide the council's activities if needed. The Written Statement accompanying the directions cited the discovery of significant additional historic issues as the reason for moving the intervention to a statutory footing.

=== Woking Borough Council, 2023 ===
In May 2023, a government review revealed that the Woking Borough Council would have debts of £2.4 billion by 2026, 100 times the size of its annual £24 million budget, including investments in hotels and residential skyscrapers, and a £6.4 million loan to a local private school. Risky property deals were attempts to offset the impact of UK Government funding cuts. The Minister for Local Government Lee Rowley announced that the council was to be overseen by a team of expert commissioners until the council could "address their commercial and financial challenges, and make transformative change across its entire operations."

On 7 June 2023, Woking Council issued a section 114 notice after forecasting a deficit of £1.2 billion for the year ending 31 March 2024 due to losses on risky investments involving hotels and skyscrapers instigated by a former Conservative administration.

In February 2024, the government permitted the council to raise its council tax by up to 10%, above the normal 5% limit.

=== Birmingham City Council, 2023 ===
Birmingham City Council issued a section 114 notice on 5 September 2023 due to a budget deficit "in the region of" £87 million, forecast to rise to £164.8 million in the 2024/25 financial year. The council blamed the deficit on liabilities over equal pay claims, problems with the installation of a new IT system and government cuts amounting to £1 billion over ten years. John Cotton and Sharon Thompson, the council's leader and deputy leader, stated that the authority had fallen victim to "a perfect storm" of financial challenges including increases in adult social care expenditure, reductions in business rates revenue and high inflation.

The council's equal pay claims, some dating back to a 2012 Supreme Court case, were estimated to be between £650 million and £760 million by March 2023. An external audit statement made by Grant Thornton on 6 September said that revelations that would "significantly increase" the council's equal pay liabilities meant that its 2020/21 and 2021/22 accounts were "materially misstated". The auditors said the equal pay claim was "one of the most significant challenges that any Council in England has ever faced". The council stated that, with its equal pay liabilities accruing at a rate of between £5 million and £14 million per month, it did not have the resources to pay the claims.

Problems with a new Oracle IT system were set to cost up to £100 million to fix according to Cotton. BBC News reported that the system was so broken that council staff could not produce accounts detailing the council's financial situation, leading to financial statements being unable to be signed off by auditors.

Anushka Asthana reported that the council had been effectively operating under section 114 spending controls for two months before the notice was officially issued.

On 17 September, The Sunday Times reported that housing secretary Michael Gove was to appoint commissioners to take over running Birmingham City Council who would make recommendations on what assets needed to be sold to balance the council's finances. A government source was reported to have said that the "scale of mismanagement" was "much worse than we thought". It was suggested that targets for a "fire sale of assets" could include the 54,000 council houses owned by the city, Birmingham's main library, Birmingham Museum and Art Gallery, Aston Hall and Sarehole Mill.

==== Responses ====
===== Conservative =====
The Prime Minister's spokesperson acknowledged that the notice would be "concerning" for residents but said that the government had "stepped in to provide support" pointing to an additional £5.1 billion it had provided to councils for the 2023/2024 financial year and adding that "it's for locally elected councils to manage their own budgets". In Prime Minister's Questions on 6 September, Nicola Richards, Conservative MP for West Bromwich East, asked "Does the Prime Minister agree that Labour have demonstrated yet again that they always run out of other people's money?"; Rishi Sunak responded that she was "exactly right" and that "they [Labour] have bankrupted Birmingham, we can't let them bankrupt Britain". Chancellor of the Exchequer Jeremy Hunt said the government would "do what is right" for Birmingham but said that no request for emergency funding had been made to the Treasury.

The council had previously described its 2022 financial plans as a "bold budget" that would "maximise the potential of a golden decade for the city"; following the section 114 notice, Robert Alden, the Conservative opposition leader on the council, accused the administration of "lying to the people of Birmingham" and calling the idea of a 'golden decade' "fools' gold".

Andy Street, the Mayor of the West Midlands, said that the notice was "deeply disturbing" and that Birmingham "deserves so much better". Street said that the region's combined authority may have to step in to fund certain projects if Birmingham City Council could no longer afford them.

===== Labour =====
Labour leader Keir Starmer told BBC Breakfast that "[taking] a step back from Birmingham, you'll see there are versions of this across the country and that is because for 13 years local authorities have been stripped of the funding they need".

The council's Labour leader John Cotton apologised to residents, pledging to protect "the things that matter most". Cotton had been on a family holiday abroad when the section 114 notice was issued but said that he had had "no prior notice" of it and that he took "immediate steps to grip the situation".

Jess Phillips, Labour MP for Birmingham Yardley, said that the long-term pressures on councils would result in "more of this to come" and that other local authorities would also end up having to issue section 114 notices. Khalid Mahmood, Labour MP for Birmingham Perry Barr, said that he believed the government would eventually have to bail out the council.

===== Others =====
Birmingham Liberal Democrats released a statement calling the situation a "failure of Titanic proportions" and Roger Harmer, the leader of the Liberal Democrat group on the council, said that "every one of Birmingham's citizens will feel the pain of this decision" and called on council leaders to apologise.

Sharon Graham, the general secretary of the Unite union, said that council workers "must not pay the price" for the council's "incompetence and financial mismanagement". A statement from the GMB union called the situation a "humiliating admission of failure" and said the council was responsible for the crisis because it had "stolen wages from its low-paid women workers".

BBC News reported that residents were worried about cuts in youth services leading to rising crime, increases in business rates, the closure of Birmingham Museum and Art Gallery, cuts to park services and the future of Perry Park.

Organisers of the city's Christmas Market announced that the market would be held and that an agreement for it to continue up to 2027 would remain in place.

With Birmingham set to host the 2026 European Athletics Championships, the European Athletic Association said it had confidence in the council's ability to hold the championships and was "actively assessing" the situation. When bidding for the competition, the council had agreed to underwrite contributions of £13.7 million to fund the event. Tony Hadley, the chair of Birchfield Harriers, said that the three years until the competition were "a long time in sport, ... [and] a long time in politics" and that the council should be given time to sort out their finances.

On 28 September, Historic England published a joint letter with Arts Council England and the National Lottery Heritage Fund calling on Birmingham's commissioners to ensure the city's heritage and culture is "protected and prioritised" and that "Birmingham's financial reconstruction must not come at the cost of its priceless heritage".

==== Draft budget ====
In February 2024, the council published its budget proposals for 2024/2025 and 2025/2026. The government commissioners said the budget was "deliverable", but that "the real work of delivery needs to take place with discipline and pace" and that "[t]here are no other choices available".

Proposals in the budget included:

- Writing off the entire of the 2023/2024 savings plan as undeliverable.
- Requesting 'Exceptional Financial Support' funding from the government totalling £225.9 million. This would include changing the cap on council tax increases, a government-backed contingency fund, funding to cover the costs of the council's redundancy programme and its equal pay liabilities, and a capitalisation direction to permit asset sales to be able to fund council expenditures.
- Increasing the level of the council's general fund balance to 5% of net expenditure as suggested by CIPFA guidance as well as amending and streamlining the council's processes regarding its financial reserves.
- Reduce budgets for highway maintenance, tourism, street cleaning and graffiti removal.
- Increasing fees at leisure centres, Birmingham Wildlife and Conservation Centre, and for garden and bulky waste disposal, as well as introducing charges to car parks at Sutton Park, Lickey Hills Country Park, and Sheldon Country Park.
- Stopping funding cultural projects and phasing out cultural grants. Affected organisations include City of Birmingham Symphony Orchestra, Ikon Gallery, Birmingham Repertory Theatre, Birmingham Royal Ballet, Birmingham Opera Company, Sampad Arts, Ex Cathedra, and Legacy Centre of Excellence.

The government permitted Birmingham City Council to raise its council tax by up to 10%, above the normal 5% limit, despite having expressed concern about "the significant financial mismanagement at the council". It was estimated that this would raise an extra £21.8 million of revenue. Michael Gove said it was "disappointing" that taxpayers would have to "foot the bill for the council's poor governance". The council confirmed that it would increase council tax by 21% over two years.

===== Responses to budget =====
Over 100 doctors in Birmingham signed an open letter to the council warning that the £51 million cut to children's services would put the "ability to keep our children safe and well" at risk.

The total defunding of arts and cultural organisations was criticised by Nick Rhodes and Roger Taylor from Duran Duran, director of the Birmingham Royal Ballet Carlos Acosta, artist Pogus Caesar, and comedian Joe Lycett.

=== Nottingham City Council, 2023 ===
Nottingham City Council issued a section 114 notice on 29 November 2023, saying it was on track for a £23 million overspend for the 2023-24 financial year. In a statement, the council said that the budget gap was down to social care cost, rising homelessness and the impact of inflation. The council noted that "past issues relating to financial governance [...] and an overspend in the last financial year" had affected its financial resilience.

By halfway through the 2023-24 financial year, the council was forecasting an overspend of around £57 million, which was later cut to around £23 million by making savings and using its reserves. A report earlier in November had shown the council to be considering issuing a notice with council leader David Mellen saying that £21 million of the excess spending was on social care and tackling homelessness. Mellen had said that councils not being funded properly was the main reason for Nottingham's financial problems and that mistakes such as the defunct Robin Hood Energy firm were "small in comparison" to funding cuts, despite the Local Democracy Reporting Service reporting that taxpayers were on the hook for £38.1 million after the energy company collapsed.

Financial problems were expected to persist for several years; the council had estimated a gross budget deficit of £50.903 million for the 2024-25 financial year by July 2023 which, even with initial cost-cutting measures being put in place and council tax being increased by the maximum 4.99%, would leave a funding gap of £16.213 million. By December 2023, this expected funding gap had increased to £33.215 million.

Redundancies in around 550 jobs, hiring freezes, service cuts (including to libraries, public transport, community centres, and Colwick Park Activity Centre) and potential sales of council assets were reported as part of the council's cost cutting plans.

In December 2023, it was announced that spending on improvements on Colwick Woods Court, a tower block in Sneinton, had been approved by the council's section 151 officer.

==== Responses ====
Robert Jenrick, government minister and MP for Newark, said that Labour had shown themselves to be "utterly unfit" to govern Nottingham and called on the government to appoint commissioners to take over financial decision making.

The Local Government Information Unit said in a statement that Nottingham's notice "comes as no surprise" and highlighted how around one in ten councils were at risk of not being able to balance their budgets. The organisation said that while the government was "quick to point the finger at 'failing councils'", in reality the system was broken and more secure local council funding was needed.

In an analysis piece, Patrick Butler, The Guardian's social policy editor, commented that Nottingham City Council's notice was an example of "a more mundane town hall insolvency" where a lack of funding rather than financial mismanagement causes councils to go effectively bankrupt.

== Warnings ==
Some local authorities have warned that they are at risk of insolvency without actually having to issue a section 114 notice.

In May 2018, Somerset County Council said that unless it met its "ambitious financial savings targets" it would be unable to balance its budget and would have to issue a section 114 notice. In February 2024, the government refused to allow Somerset to raise its council tax by 9.99%, above the normal 5% limit.

In November 2018, Kingston London Borough Council leader Liz Green said that the authority was "about two years behind Northamptonshire" and that if finances were not brought under control, the council would "be in effective bankruptcy by 2021". The Liberal Democrats, who had come into power after the 2018 council election, blamed the former Conservative administration. The former Conservative council leader Kevin Davis said that the comparison with Northamptonshire was "just rubbish" and that the council's finances were fine.

In September 2023, Surrey Heath Borough Council's Liberal Democrat administration which had come into power at the 2023 elections warned that the local authority could be effectively bankrupt within two years due to debts of £165 million. The council's leader, Shaun Macdonald, blamed the former Conservative administration and Michael Gove, the local MP and the Secretary of State for Levelling Up, Housing and Communities, for being "asleep at the wheel". The council had bought The Square shopping centre in 2016 for £94 million; by 2023, it was valued at only £30 million. A House of Fraser building was bought at the same time for £18.5 million but was assessed in 2023 as having asbestos in the walls and being worth just £2.92 million. The council suggested it could refurbish and move to the House of Fraser site in order to cut costs.

In September 2023, the leader of Havering London Borough Council warned the authority could be six months away from triggering a notice because of the increasing cost of social care and housing.

In December 2023, leaders of Cheshire East Council said that they faced issuing a notice due to the cancellation of the northern part of HS2 after they had spent £11 million preparing for the rail line. £8.6 million of the expenditure had been funded by borrowing which would have to be made up from the local authority's remaining budget, risking the council's solvency.

A 2023 poll of English councillors for The New Statesman found that a quarter of them believed that their council would soon go bankrupt, with 6% saying it was "very likely" to occur.

In January 2024, Bournemouth, Christchurch and Poole Council announced it could have to issue a notice within the year due to a £60 million deficit in its education budget from overspends to fund special educational needs and disability accommodations. The deficit is exempt from currently being assessed as part of the council's overall financial health due to a 'statutory override' which the government put in place in 2020. However, this exemption is set to run out in March 2026 (just within the 2025-2026 financial year). BCP Council said in a report that, because when the override runs out the council would be effectively insolvent, a notice would have to be issued in December 2024.

Over 40 Conservative backbench MPs (including Greg Clark, Robert Jenrick, Jake Berry, Priti Patel, and Damian Green) wrote to Prime Minister Rishi Sunak in January 2024, warning that more emergency support was needed for local councils and threatening to vote against the Local Government Settlement unless more funding was made available.

In February 2024, the Levelling Up, Housing and Communities Committee released their third Financial Distress in Local Authorities report. Among its recommendations was that the government should make £4 billion of funding available to councils for the 2024-2025 financial year to prevent more bankruptcies and cuts to local services. Clive Betts, the committee's chair, said that the financial crisis in local government was "out of control" and that without emergency funding, "well-run councils could face ... going bust".

In December 2024, the Royal Borough of Windsor and Maidenhead issued its draft budget for 2025/26, warning that a "significant increase to council tax bills" would be required because the council was "on the brink of effective bankruptcy". In February 2025, The Guardian named Windsor and Maidenhead as one of the councils "considered to be in serious financial difficulties" alongside Hampshire County Council and Bradford City Council while suggesting that the government would allow councils to increase council tax by up to 25% to avoid issuing Section 114 notices.

== See also ==
- Oflog
- Local government in the United Kingdom
