= Amyas Morse, Baron Morse =

Scottish auditor (born 1949)

The Right Honourable The Lord Morse KCB
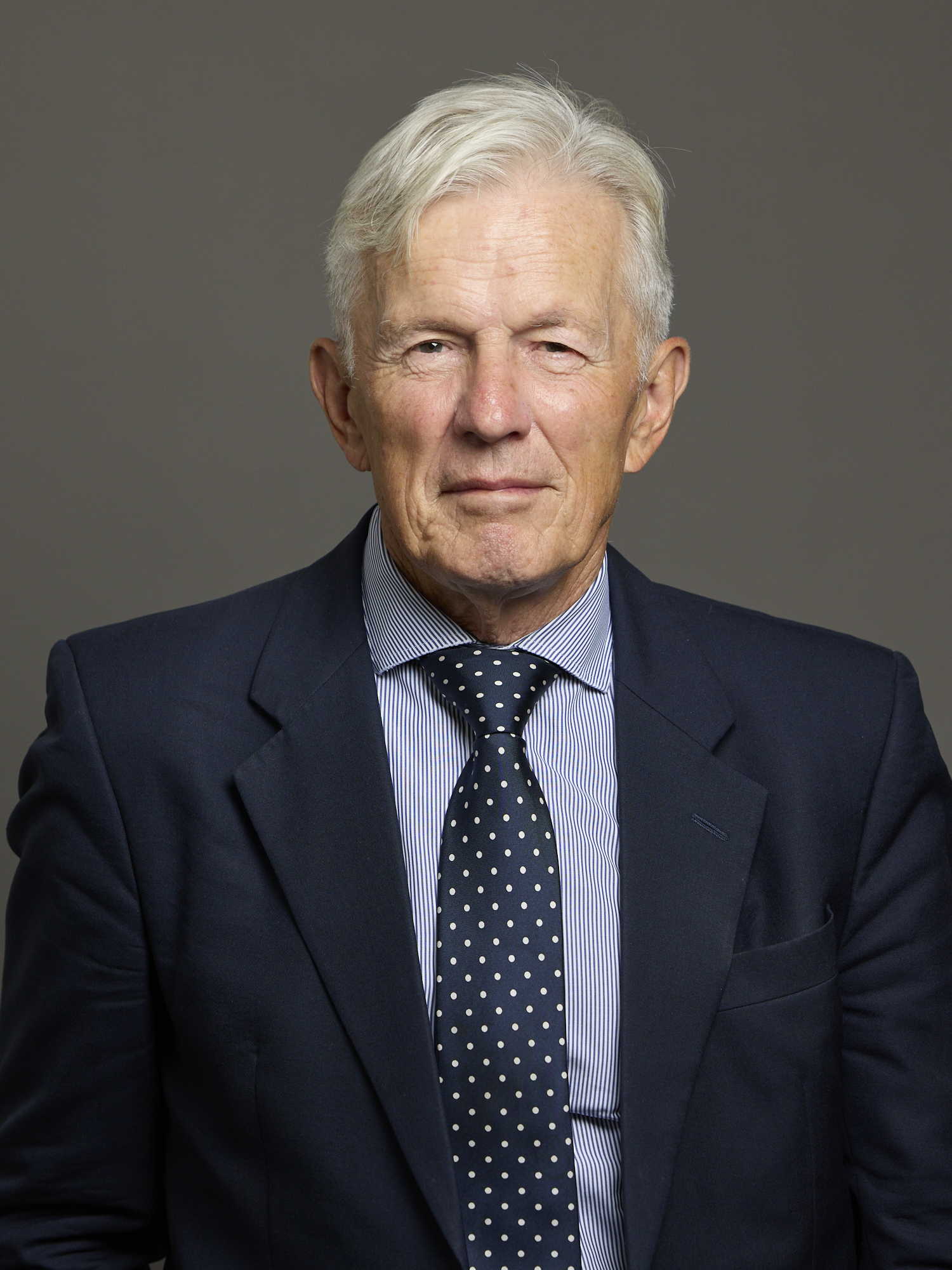
- Official portrait, 2025

Member of the House of Lords
- Lord Temporal
- Life peerage 26 March 2021

Comptroller and Auditor General
- In office 2009–2019
- Preceded by: Sir John Bourn
- Succeeded by: Gareth Davies

Personal details
- Born: 28 June 1949 (age 77) Glasgow, Scotland
- Party: Crossbench
- Awards: Life peer

Amyas Charles Edward Morse, Baron Morse, KCB (born 28 June 1949) is a British politician and former interim chair of the Office for Local Government. Between 2009 and 2019 he was the Comptroller and Auditor General of the National Audit Office, an independent Parliamentary body.

Born in Glasgow, Morse led the Coopers and Lybrand practice in Scotland before moving to London to manage the London City Office, subsequently becoming executive partner of Coopers and Lybrand UK. He was a global managing partner at PricewaterhouseCoopers before he was named Comptroller and Auditor General, succeeding Sir John Bourn.

== Affiliations ==
- Member, Institute of Chartered Accountants (Scotland)

== Honours ==
Morse was appointed Knight Commander of the Order of the Bath (KCB) in the 2014 Birthday Honours for services to parliament and public sector audit.

On 24 February 2021, it was announced that he had been recommended for a life peerage by the House of Lords Appointments Commission. He was created Baron Morse, of Aldeburgh in the County of Suffolk on 26 March 2021.

Orders of precedence in the United Kingdom
Preceded by The Lord Khan of Burnley	Gentlemen; Baron Morse	Followed by The Lord Stevens of Birmingham
