= Oflog =

Body for local government in England

Office for Local Government

Department overview
- Formed: July 4, 2023; 3 years ago
- Dissolved: December 16, 2024; 19 months ago
- Headquarters: 2 Marsham Street, London, England
- Parent department: Ministry of Housing, Communities and Local Government
- Website: www.gov.uk/government/organisations/office-for-local-government

The Office for Local Government (Oflog) was a body responsible for assessing and improving the performance of local government in England.

Oflog was established in July 2023 by the Conservative Sunak government following a string of local authority bankruptcies, in order to collect statistics on local performance. The body answered to the Ministry of Housing, Communities and Local Government. In February 2024 the minister responsible, Michael Gove, set out Oflog's priorities for the financial year 2024–2025 and invited Oflog to publish a corporate plan for 2024 to 2027.

From June 2024, Oflog had no chair following the departure of interim chair Lord Morse in advance of the 2024 United Kingdom general election. In that month, following the release of a dataset on local government performance, The Times published an article ranking local authorities; This led to criticism of Oflog for its failure to provide sufficient information on usage of the statistics, with some calling for a "reset" following the 2024 election.

Oflog was abolished by the Labour Starmer government on 16 December 2024. Jim McMahon, Minister of State for Local Government and English Devolution, wrote that the government had "an urgent priority to fix the local audit system, which was not part of Oflog's remit", and said "Oflog was hampered with a vague and broad remit that risked duplication of functions performed elsewhere".
