= Charles Lister Ryan =

British civil servant (1831–1920)

Sir Charles Ryan KCB JP
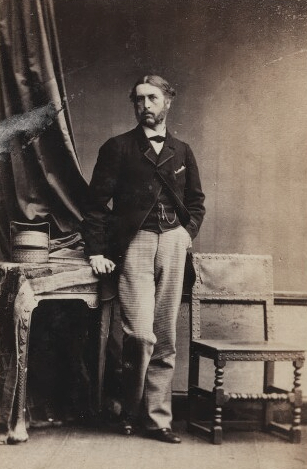
- Ryan in 1861
- Born: Charles Lister Ryan; 30 September 1831; St John's, Worcester, England
- Died: 20 November 1920 (aged 89); Ascot, Berkshire, England
- Education: Eton College
- Occupation: civil servant

Sir Charles Lister Ryan KCB JP (30 September 1831 – 20 November 1920) was a British civil servant. He served as Comptroller and Auditor-General of the Exchequer from 1888 until his retirement in 1896.

== Life ==
He was born in St John's, Worcester, the fifth son of barrister Sir Edward Ryan and Louisa Whitmore. He was educated at Eton College.

Ryan was a Clerk in the Treasury (1851–65), also serving as private secretary to Benjamin Disraeli (1858), Sir Stafford Northcote (1859), and William Ewart Gladstone when he was Chancellor of the Exchequer (1859–65). He was appointed secretary to the Board of Audit in 1865. He served as Assistant-Comptroller and Auditor (1873-88), followed by Comptroller and Auditor of the Exchequer and Audit Department (1888–96). He was also a governor of Wellington College, Berkshire.

He was appointed a Companion of the Order of the Bath in the 1881 Birthday Honours and knighted in the same order in the 1887 Golden Jubilee Honours.

== Family ==
In 1862, Ryan married Jane Georgiana, daughter of Sir John Shaw Lefevre and sister of Lord Eversley. Their daughter Madeleine Harriet Dagmar married Arthur Elliot in 1888.

He died at Burleigh Bushes Cottage in Ascot, Berkshire.

Political offices
Preceded by Sir William Dunbar, 7th Baronet	Comptroller and Auditor General; 1888–1896	Succeeded by Richard Mills
