= Jeremy Colman =

Welsh civil servant (born 1948)

Jeremy Colman (born April 1948) is a former Auditor General for Wales.

He was born in London and was educated at The John Lyon School, followed by Peterhouse, Cambridge, where he read Mathematics, and Imperial College, London, where he studied for an MSc DIC in Management Science.

His early career was in the civil service, including appointment as Private Secretary to successive holders of the post of Head of the Home Civil Service, and in the Treasury, where he played a leading role in the privatisation of British Airways and of the British Airports Authority. In 1988 he moved to the private sector, first as a Director of a major investment bank (County NatWest), and later as a partner in Price Waterhouse, based in Prague as Head of Corporate Finance.

He joined the National Audit Office (NAO) in 1993, where for 12 years he was responsible for Private Finance Initiatives and Public-private partnerships, before being appointed as the first head of the new Wales Audit Office on 1 April 2005 for an eight-year term of office.

Colman resigned from his post on 3 February 2010, after an internal investigation found child pornography on his work computer. South Wales Police began an investigation, and on 8 February arrested Colman on charges described as "possessing indecent images". Colman pleaded guilty to fifteen separate offences and, in November 2010, he was sentenced to eight months in jail.

== Personal life ==
Colman had a home in Dinas Powys, Vale of Glamorgan, but lived in Peterborough, Cambridgeshire.
