= 2023 Surrey Heath Borough Council election =

2023 English local election

- 4 May 2023

All 35 seats to Surrey Heath Borough Council 18 seats needed for a majority

	First party	Second party	Third party
Leader	Sashi Mylvaganam	Alan McClafferty
Party	Liberal Democrats	Conservative	Independent
Last election	10 seats, 28.6%	18 seats, 51.4%	4 seats, 11.4%
Seats before	9	18	5 (Note: Of the five independents on the council before the election, two formed a group called the "Camberley Independents", led by Richard Brooks, and the other three formed a group called the "Community Group" with the one Labour councillor, led by Victoria Wheeler.)
Seats won	24	6	3
Seat change	▲14	▼12	▼1
Popular vote	28,416	22,912	3,927
Percentage	48.8%	39.4%	6.7%
Swing	▲20.4%	▼7.4%	▼3.7%
	Fourth party	Fifth party
Leader		Sharon Galliford
Party	Labour	Green
Last election	1 seat, 2.9%	2 seats, 5.7%
Seats before	1	2
Seats won	2	0
Seat change	▲1	▼2
Popular vote	2,428	145
Percentage	4.2%	0.2%
Swing	▼1.8%	▼4.7%
- Winner of each seat at the 2023 Surrey Heath Borough Council election
Leader before election
Alan McClafferty
Conservative
No overall control
Leader after election
David Whitcroft
Liberal Democrats

The 2023 Surrey Heath Borough Council election took place on 4 May 2023 to elect 32 of 35 members of Surrey Heath Borough Council in England. It was held on the same day as other local elections. The Liberal Democrats took control of the council from a minority Conservative administration.

== Overview ==
Prior to the election the council was under no overall control, being led by a Conservative minority administration. The election in the Frimley Green ward was postponed until 15 June 2023 following the death of one of the original candidates. Of the seats where elections were held on 5 May, the Liberal Democrats won 21 seats, enough to give them an overall majority on the council for the first time in its history.

The Liberal Democrat group leader before the election, Sashi Mylvaganam, was a candidate in Frimley Green ward and so had to wait until 15 June to see if he would be re-elected. As such, the party chose David Whitcroft instead to be the new leader of the council, being appointed at the subsequent annual meeting of the council on 17 May 2023. The Liberal Democrats won all three seats in the postponed Frimley Green election, with Sashi Mylvaganam returning to the council. The party then reconsidered its leadership, but chose to appoint neither Whitcroft nor Mylvaganam as its leader, appointing instead Shaun Macdonald. He was subsequently confirmed as the new leader of the council on 28 June 2023.

== Results summary ==
2023 Surrey Heath Borough Council election
Party	Candidates	Seats	Gains	Losses	Net gain/loss	Seats %	Votes %	Votes	+/−
Liberal Democrats	31	24	15	1	▲14	68.6	48.8	28,416	+20.4
Conservative	35	6	2	14	▼12	17.1	39.4	22,912	–7.4
Independent	7	3	0	1	▼1	8.6	6.7	3,927	–3.7
Labour	7	2	2	1	▲1	5.7	4.2	2,428	–1.8
Green	1	0	0	2	▼2	0.0	0.2	145	–4.7
Reform	2	0	0	0	Steady	0.0	0.6	372	N/A

== Ward results ==
The results for each ward were:

=== Bagshot ===
Bagshot (3 seats)
Party	Candidate	Votes	%	±%
Conservative	Mark Gordon	1,061	55.1	+16.7
Conservative	Valerie White*	978	50.8	+8.1
Liberal Democrats	Richard Wilson	681	35.4	−16.2
Conservative	Frank Du Cann	677	35.2	+1.2
Liberal Democrats	Cathy Whitcroft	676	35.1	−9.3
Liberal Democrats	Zee Virani	599	31.1	−8.7
Independent	Andrew Willgoss	364	18.9	N/A
Reform	Sam Goggin	202	10.5	N/A
Registered electors		5,649		
Turnout		1,924	34.1	
Conservative gain from Liberal Democrats				
Conservative hold				
Liberal Democrats hold				

=== Bisley and West End ===
Bisley and West End (3 seats)
Party	Candidate	Votes	%	±%
Liberal Democrats	Liz Noble*	1,312	57.5	+34.4
Liberal Democrats	Sarbie Kang	902	39.5	+18.7
Liberal Democrats	Ying Perrett	863	37.8	+21.0
Conservative	Adrian Page*	753	33.0	−13.6
Conservative	Tony Henderson	702	30.8	−12.5
Conservative	Alex Hanney	625	27.4	−12.6
Independent	Graham Alleway*	598	26.2	−16.3
Independent	Adrian Keeling	408	17.9	N/A
Registered electors		6,931		
Turnout		2,281	32.9	
Liberal Democrats gain from Conservative				
Liberal Democrats gain from Conservative				
Liberal Democrats gain from Independent				

=== Frimley ===
Frimley (2 seats)
Party	Candidate	Votes	%	±%
Liberal Democrats	Alan Ashbery	783	60.9	N/A
Liberal Democrats	David O'Mahoney	722	56.1	N/A
Conservative	Sarah Croke*	511	39.7	−29.9
Conservative	Darryl Ratiram*	397	30.9	−36.0
Registered electors		3,728		
Turnout		1286	34.5	
Liberal Democrats gain from Conservative				
Liberal Democrats gain from Conservative				

=== Frimley Green ===
Following the death of a candidate in Frimley Green ward (three members) the election was countermanded. A poll took place on the 15th June 2023, with Attieh Fard replacing the late Karen Campion.

Frimley Green (3 seats)
Party	Candidate	Votes	%	±%
Liberal Democrats	Jacques Olmo	1,131	61.4	+6.7
Liberal Democrats	Helen Whitcroft	1,111	60.3	+5.9
Liberal Democrats	Sashi Mylvaganam*	1,070	58.1	+10.4
Conservative	Stuart Black	738	42.4	+10.1
Conservative	Howard Thomson	610	33.1	+2.6
Conservative	Attieh Fard	608	33.0	+5.1
Turnout		1843	35.6	
Registered electors		5,174		
Liberal Democrats hold				
Liberal Democrats hold				
Liberal Democrats hold				

=== Heatherside ===
Heatherside (3 seats)
Party	Candidate	Votes	%	±%
Liberal Democrats	John Skipper*	1,613	65.3	+17.2
Liberal Democrats	Louise Ashbery	1,559	63.1	+10.0
Liberal Democrats	Bob Raikes	1,512	61.2	+16.0
Conservative	Julia Wood	829	33.5	−5.5
Conservative	Simon Dickens	819	33.1	−2.9
Conservative	Dave Henry	811	32.8	+0.8
Registered electors		5,728		
Turnout		2471	43.1	
Liberal Democrats hold				
Liberal Democrats hold				
Liberal Democrats hold				

=== Lightwater ===
Lightwater (3 seats)
Party	Candidate	Votes	%	±%
Liberal Democrats	Julie Hoad	1,184	52.2	N/A
Liberal Democrats	Shaun MacDonald	1,128	49.7	N/A
Liberal Democrats	Kevin Thompson	1,080	47.6	N/A
Conservative	Katia Malcaus Cooper	966	42.6	+3.3
Conservative	Rebecca Jennings-Evans*	943	41.5	−2.6
Conservative	James Harris	840	37.0	−1.3
Reform	Peter Appleford	170	7.5	−7.2
Labour	Tom Johnson	144	6.3	N/A
Registered electors		5,311		
Turnout		2270	42.7	
Liberal Democrats gain from Green				
Liberal Democrats gain from Conservative				
Liberal Democrats gain from Green				

=== Mytchett and Deepcut ===
Mytchett and Deepcut (3 seats)
Party	Candidate	Votes	%	±%
Liberal Democrats	David Whitcroft	995	54.9	+10.3
Liberal Democrats	Morgan Rise*	961	53.0	+12.3
Liberal Democrats	Cliff Betton	950	52.4	+11.8
Conservative	Attieh Fard	752	41.5	−10.4
Conservative	Lawrence Alexander	747	41.2	+8.3
Conservative	David Natolie	661	36.4	+4.2
Registered electors		5,663		
Turnout		1814	32.0	
Liberal Democrats hold				
Liberal Democrats hold				
Liberal Democrats gain from Conservative				

=== Old Dean ===
Old Dean (2 seats)
Party	Candidate	Votes	%	±%
Conservative	Shaun Garrett*	563	58.9	+10.7
Conservative	Lewis Mears	504	52.7	+5.5
Labour	Heather Gibbs	393	41.1	−9.1
Labour	Brian Gibbs	382	40.0	−0.9
Registered electors		3,860		
Turnout		957	24.8	
Conservative hold				
Conservative gain from Labour				

=== Parkside ===
Parkside (2 seats)
Party	Candidate	Votes	%	±%
Liberal Democrats	Rob Lee	837	54.6	+20.3
Liberal Democrats	Nirmal Kang	833	54.3	+28.7
Conservative	Louise Grainger	653	42.6	−14.8
Conservative	Steed Bennett	642	41.9	−12.4
Registered electors		3,931		
Turnout		1534	39.0	
Liberal Democrats gain from Conservative				
Liberal Democrats gain from Conservative				

=== St Michael's ===
St Michael's (2 seats)
Party	Candidate	Votes	%	±%
Labour	Jonathan Quin	684	56.5	+17.6
Labour	Murray Rowlands	661	54.6	+15.7
Conservative	Chris Buxton	503	41.6	−16.3
Conservative	Gregory Mwenkentishi	417	34.5	−18.9
Registered electors		4,304		
Turnout		1210	28.1	
Labour gain from Conservative				
Labour gain from Conservative				

=== St Paul's ===
St Paul's (2 seats)
Party	Candidate	Votes	%	±%
Conservative	Jonny Cope	714	48.5	−19.2
Conservative	Josh Thorne	692	47.0	−15.7
Liberal Democrats	Simon Browne	673	45.7	+14.0
Liberal Democrats	Matt Hodges-Long	654	44.4	+16.9
Labour	Manuela Radeva	83	5.6	N/A
Labour	George Ridgway	81	5.5	N/A
Registered electors		3,869		
Turnout		1472	38.1	
Conservative hold				
Conservative hold				

=== Town ===
Town (2 seats)
Party	Candidate	Votes	%	±%
Liberal Democrats	Mary Glauert	706	59.6	+18.8
Liberal Democrats	Leanne MacIntyre	690	58.3	+22.6
Conservative	Nathan Drury	457	38.6	−19.8
Conservative	Ricky Singh	414	35.0	−19.0
Registered electors		4,056		
Turnout		1184	29.2	
Liberal Democrats gain from Conservative				
Liberal Democrats gain from Conservative				

=== Watchetts ===
Watchetts (2 seats)
Party	Candidate	Votes	%	±%
Liberal Democrats	Lisa Finan-Cooke	831	59.4	N/A
Liberal Democrats	Kel Finan-Cooke	823	58.8	N/A
Conservative	Caroline Adam-Holboj	533	38.1	−23.1
Conservative	Benedict Dias	511	36.5	−23.4
Registered electors		4,009		
Turnout		1400	34.9	
Liberal Democrats gain from Conservative				
Liberal Democrats gain from Conservative				

=== Windlesham and Chobham ===
Windlesham and Chobham (3 seats)
Party	Candidate	Votes	%	±%
Independent	Victoria Wheeler*	864	43.6	−21.1
Independent	Pat Tedder*	790	39.9	−22.3
Independent	Emma-Jane McGrath*	611	30.8	−22.1
Conservative	Justin Cars	535	27.0	−3.6
Liberal Democrats	Amy Moqbel	534	26.9	N/A
Liberal Democrats	Jack Massarano	513	25.9	N/A
Liberal Democrats	Sara Ibrahim	490	24.7	N/A
Conservative	Abu Bakar	394	19.9	−5.2
Conservative	Faaris Khan	352	17.8	−5.0
Independent	Alison Hook	292	14.7	−6.3
Green	Clare Relton	145	7.3	N/A
Registered electors		5,566		
Turnout		1982	35.6	
Independent hold				
Independent hold				
Independent hold				

== Changes 2023–2027 ==
- 9 September 2024: Sashi Mylvaganam left the Liberal Democrats to join the Conservative group, citing frustration with the Liberal Democrat leadership.

=== By-elections ===
==== Old Dean ====
Old Dean by-election: 24 October 2024
Party	Candidate	Votes	%	±%
Liberal Democrats	Dave Hough	394	44.7	N/A
Conservative	Catherine Gibbard	278	31.6	–27.3
Reform	Sam Goggin	109	12.4	N/A
Labour	Charlie Wilson	96	10.9	–30.2
Independent	Tal Belnik	4	0.5	N/A
Majority		116	13.1	N/A
Turnout		881	22.6	–2.2
Registered electors		3,894		
Liberal Democrats gain from Conservative				

The by-election was triggered by the resignation of Conservative councillor Lewis Mears on 17 September 2024, after he was offered a job opportunity abroad.
