= Audit Wales =

Welsh public auditing body

Wales Audit Office
- Swyddfa Archwilio Cymru
- Abbreviation: WAO
- Nickname: Audit Wales; Archwilio Cymru (Welsh)
- Type: Independent public body
- Region served: Wales
- Chief Executive and Auditor General: Catherine Mealing-Jones
- Affiliations: Auditor General for Wales
- Staff: 269
- Website: www.audit.wales

The Wales Audit Office (WAO, Welsh: Swyddfa Archwilio Cymru), branded as Audit Wales (Welsh: Archwilio Cymru) together with the Auditor General for Wales, is an independent public body, that has overall responsibility for auditing on behalf and supporting the work of the Auditor General for Wales, across all sectors of government in Wales, except those reserved to the UK Government.

The term "Wales Audit Office" was used in the Public Audit (Wales) Act 2004 of the UK Parliament, to refer to the "Auditor General for Wales and the members of his staff", with the body created on 1 April 2005. The body became a separate body corporate by the Public Audit (Wales) Act 2013 of the National Assembly for Wales (now Senedd) passed on 29 April 2013.

== Function ==
Their aim is to ensure that the people of Wales know whether public money is being managed wisely and that public bodies in Wales understand how to improve outcomes.

This overall aim is supported by four key objectives:

- Provide timely assurance on governance and stewardship of public money and assets
- Offer useful insight on the extent to which resources are used well in meeting people's needs
- Clearly identify and promote ways to which the provision of public services may be improved
- Be an accountable, well-run and efficient organisation that provides a stimulating and rewarding environment to work

Audit Wales currently audits around 800 public bodies including the Welsh Government, NHS Wales, and local government.

== Structure ==
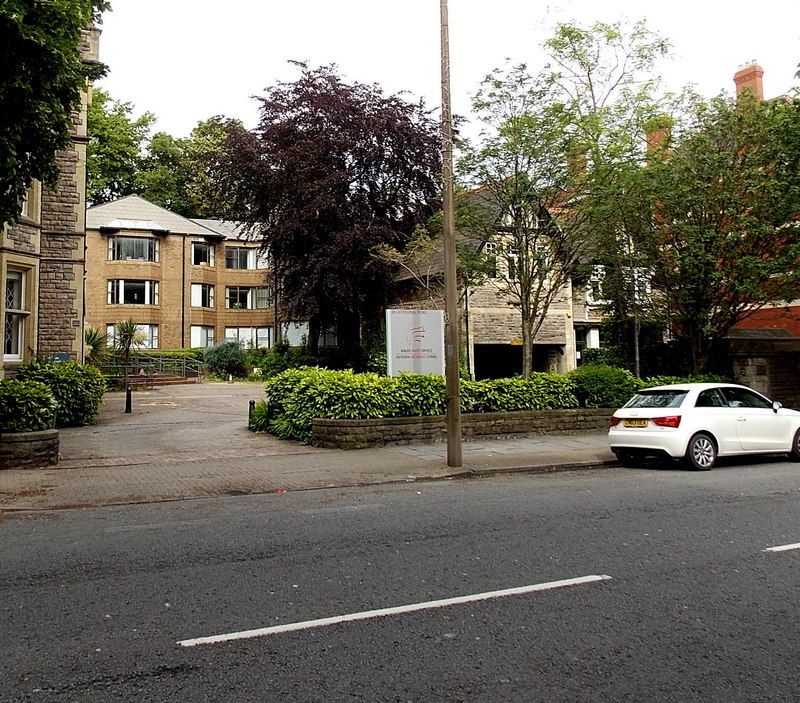
Audit Wales in Cathedral Road, Cardiff

Audit Wales takes the form of a statutory board, which employs staff, secures resources and monitors and advises the Auditor General. The Senedd appoints the Chair and 3 other non-executive members to the board. The other members are the Auditor General and 3 employees. Audit Wales currently employ around 240 people across 3 offices in Cardiff, Swansea and Ewloe.

The Wales Audit Office and the Auditor General share the trademarked name "Audit Wales".

== History ==
On 1 July 1999, the National Assembly for Wales (Transfer of Functions) Order 1999 (SI 1999/672) came into effect, this transferred all powers from the Secretary of State for Wales to the National Assembly for Wales. Wales did not have its own auditing body, as all public auditing was carried out by the National Audit Office and the Audit Commission.

It was not until 1 April 2005 that the Wales Audit Office was created after the Public Audit (Wales) Act 2004 of the UK Parliament came into effect. The act referred to the body to include the "Auditor General for Wales and the members of his staff".

The body became a separate body corporate, following the Public Audit (Wales) Act 2013 of the National Assembly for Wales (now Senedd) passed on 29 April 2013.

== Legislation ==
The Public Audit (Wales) Act 2004, the Government of Wales Act 1998 and Government of Wales Act 2006 and other legislation currently provide the statutory basis for the Auditor General and the auditors he appoints in local government to fulfill their purpose across the Welsh public sector. In 2012 the Welsh Government introduced before the National Assembly the Public Audit (Wales) Bill. One feature of the bill was to make provision for the Auditor General to be the statutory auditor of local government bodies. It was passed as the Public Audit (Wales) Act 2013.

== See also ==
- National Audit Office (United Kingdom)
- Northern Ireland Audit Office
- Audit Scotland
- Public Accounts Commission
