= Public Accounts Commission =

British oversight body

The Public Accounts Commission (TPAC) is a UK body created under the National Audit Act 1983 to audit and provide oversight of the National Audit Office, the parliamentary body responsible for auditing governmental departments and agencies. Its reports are available to the public.

== Chairs ==
Committee chairs include those listed below.

Name	Start	End	Party	Constituency
Edward Leigh	16 March 2011	30 March 2015	Conservative	Gainsborough
Clive Efford	21 January 2025	present	Labour	Eltham and Chislehurst

== Composition ==
The Commission comprises nine MPs, including the Leader of the House of Commons and the Chair of the Public Accounts Select Committee, who serve ex officio. The remaining seven, who may not be Ministers of the Crown, are chosen by the House of Commons. The Commission elects its chair from among its numbers. Members continue to serve despite a dissolution of Parliament, but - excepting the Chair of the Public Accounts Committee - are required to resign if they are not standing or are defeated for re-election. A list of current members is available on the UK Parliament website.

As of March 2026, the membership is:

Member	Party	Constituency
Clive Efford MP (chair)	Labour	Eltham and Chislehurst
Phil Brickell MP	Labour	Bolton West
Sir Alan Campbell MP (Lord President; Leader of the House of Commons)	Labour	Tynemouth
Sir Geoffrey Clifton-Brown MP (PAC chair)	Conservative	North Cotswolds
John Glen MP	Conservative	Salisbury
Tom Hayes MP	Labour	Bournemouth East
Sarah Olney MP	Lib Dems	Richmond Park
Chris Vince MP	Labour	Harlow
Michelle Welsh MP	Labour	Sherwood Forest

== See also ==
- List of committees of the United Kingdom Parliament
