= Auditor General for Wales =

Welsh public official

- Flag of Wales
- Incumbent; Adrian Crompton since July 2018; 8 years ago
- Member of: Audit Wales
- Reports to: Senedd
- Appointer: Monarch of the United Kingdom
- Term length: 8 years
- Constituting instrument: Government of Wales Act 2006; Public Audit (Wales) Act 2013
- Inaugural holder: Jeremy Colman
- Formation: February 2005; 21 years ago
- Website: www.wao.gov.uk/about-us/whos-who/adrian-crompton

The Auditor General for Wales (Welsh: Archwilydd Cyffredinol Cymru) is the public official in charge of the Wales Audit Office, the body responsible for auditing the Welsh Government, its public bodies, National Health Service bodies and local government in Wales. The Auditor General for Wales is responsible for auditing £20 billion of taxpayers' money each year.

Public Audit (Wales) Act 2013 (Note: Section 36.)
- Act of the National Assembly for Wales
- National Assembly for Wales
- Long title: An Act of the National Assembly for Wales to make provision reforming audit arrangements in Wales; continuing the office of Auditor General for Wales and creating a new body to be known as the Wales Audit Office; providing for the Auditor General for Wales to audit local government bodies in Wales; and for connected purposes.
- Citation: 2013 anaw 3
- Territorial extent: Wales

Dates
- Royal assent: 29 April 2013
- Commencement: various (Note: Section 35.)

Other legislation
- Amends: Social Security Administration Act 1992; Government of Wales Act 2006
- Amended by: Wales Act 2017

Status: Amended

Text of statute as originally enacted

Revised text of statute as amended

Text of the Public Audit (Wales) Act 2013 as in force today (including any amendments) within the United Kingdom, from legislation.gov.uk.

It is a statutory appointment made on the nomination of the Senedd (Welsh Parliament; Welsh: Senedd Cymru), in accordance with the provisions of the Public Audit (Wales) Act 2013 (anaw 3).

The first full-time Auditor General for Wales, Jeremy Colman, was appointed on 1 April 2005 for an initial five-year term subsequently extended in 2009 for a further three years. Colman resigned in February 2010 after an internal investigation at the Wales Audit Office and subsequently pleaded guilty to possession of indecent images of children.

Interim Auditor General, Gillian Body, took responsibility for running the office prior to the appointment of Huw Vaughan Thomas, from 1 October 2010. In the aftermath of the jailing, the chair of the Assembly's public accounts committee commented that the office would recover and that a "golden future lay ahead" for the Office.

The Auditor General and the Wales Audit Office both operate under the trademark "Audit Wales".

== Notable reports ==
In 2006, the Auditor General "took the unprecedented step" of holding public hearings, because the report was a substitute for public hearings.

In 2010, the Auditor General described poverty as the "single major challenge" facing Wales at that time.

== See also ==
- Auditor general
- Comptroller
- Comptroller and Auditor General (United Kingdom)
- Auditor General for Scotland
- Comptroller and Auditor General for Northern Ireland
