= National Audit Office (United Kingdom) =

UK Parliamentary auditing body

Coordinates: 51.49159°N 0.1485°W

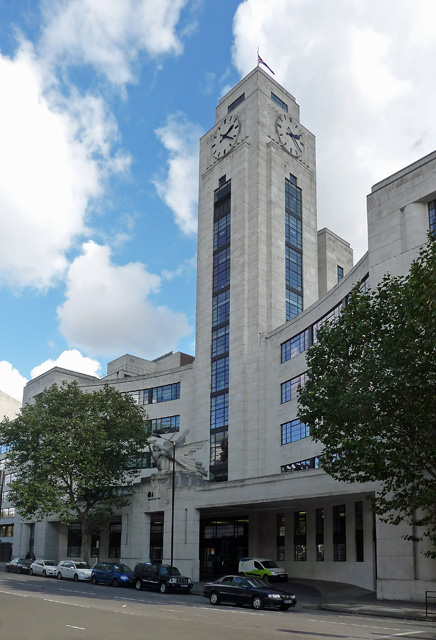
- The National Audit Office's Head Office in Buckingham Palace Road, London, built originally as the Imperial Airways Empire Terminal

Independent Parliamentary body overview
- Formed: 1983
- Preceding independent Parliamentary body: Exchequer and Audit Department
- Jurisdiction: Government of the United Kingdom
- Motto: Helping the nation spend wisely
- Employees: 965
- Annual budget: £64.5m net budget 16–17
- Independent Parliamentary body executive: Gareth Davies
- Parent department: Public Accounts Commission
- Website: nao.org.uk

- Applies to: United Kingdom (UK Government only)
- Relates to: Financial auditing

Other UK counterparts
- England: Various private auditors (local government)
- Northern Ireland: Northern Ireland; Audit Office
- Scotland: Audit Scotland
- Wales: Audit Wales

The National Audit Office (NAO) is an independent Parliamentary body in the United Kingdom which is responsible for auditing central government departments, government agencies and non-departmental public bodies. The NAO also carries out value for money (VFM) audits into the administration of public policy.

== Function ==
The NAO is the auditor of bodies funded directly by the Parliament of the United Kingdom.

The NAO reports to the Comptroller and Auditor General who is an officer of the House of Commons of the Parliament of the United Kingdom and in turn reports to the Public Accounts Commission, a statutory body established under section 2 of the National Audit Act 1983. The reports produced by the NAO are reviewed by the Public Accounts Committee, a select committee of the House of Commons, and in some cases investigated further.

The NAO has two main streams of work: Financial Audits and Value For Money (VFM) audits.

The NAO's financial audits give assurance over three aspects of government expenditure: the truth and fairness of financial statements; the regularity (or statutory validity) of the expenditure, and; the propriety of the audited body's conduct in accordance with parliamentary, statutory and public expectations. Financial audits are carried out in much the same way as private auditing bodies and the NAO voluntarily applies the International Standards on Auditing (ISAs). The NAO is subject to inspection by the Audit Quality Review team of the Financial Reporting Council.

Value for Money (VFM) audits are non-financial audits to measure the effectiveness, economy and efficiency of government spending. Roughly sixty of these reports are produced each year, the most notable from recent years being the reports on MRSA, which led to an increase in public interest in the topic, the report on the rescue of British Energy and the report on the Public Private Partnership to maintain the London Underground. The remits of the NAO and the Public Accounts Committee do not allow them to question the policy itself and so VFM reports only examine the implementation of policy. The responsibility for questioning policy is left for other select committees and debating chambers of Parliament, but this has not prevented the PAC being named committee of the year in 2006.

"Good Governance", an output somewhere between financial and VFM audits, was previously a strand of NAO work, but is no longer a focus of activity. The NAO does, however, publish best practice guidance for public sector organisations. An example includes the fact sheet on governance statements. In addition, the NAO undertakes fast-paced and more narrowly focused work called investigations.

The NAO received new powers under the Local Audit and Accountability Act 2014 to provide an end-to-end view of policy implementation, and produce reports aimed at the local government sector.

=== The Comptroller Function ===
The Comptroller Function is administered by the Exchequer Section within the NAO.

Its work centres on recording all transactions to and from the Consolidated and National Loans funds. Money cannot be paid from either of these without the C&AG's prior approval. This approval is granted every banking day through a mechanism known as 'the credit'. The Exchequer Section is also responsible for agreeing payments from the Consolidated Fund directly to certain bodies, including the King (through the civil list) and judicial salaries.

=== Parliamentary links ===
The NAO produces a number of briefings for select committees, but its key audience is the Public Accounts Committee. It also has a strong relationship with the Public Accounts Commission that oversees the work of the NAO and approves its budgets.

Public Accounts Committee

The NAO and Public Accounts Committee (PAC) form the key links of the public audit cycle, which has the following sequence:

- The NAO performs financial and VFM audits and makes its reports public
- The PAC has hearings based on NAO reports wherein failures in meeting regularity or propriety requirements are apparent.
- The PAC provides a report with recommendations based on PAC hearings.
- The Government responds to the PAC report in a Treasury Minute.
- The NAO publishes a reply to the minute and there may be an NAO/PAC follow-up study.

Public Accounts Commission

The Public Accounts Commission (TPAC) annually approves the NAO's corporate plans and budgets. It also receives value for money reports on the operation of the NAO. These are written by private sector audit firms in much the same manner as the NAO reports on Central Government.

=== International Work ===
The National Audit Office is a member of the International Organisation of Supreme Audit Institutions (INTOSAI). The NAO shares knowledge and experience with other Supreme Audit Institutions (SAIs) around the world and undertakes the audit of some international bodies. For example, between 2010 and 2016 the C&AG was one of three members of the United Nations Board of Auditors, responsible for auditing the United Nations itself, including peacekeeping operations and related organisations such as UNICEF and the UN High Commissioner for Refugees (UNHCR).

== History ==
The earliest known mention of a public official responsible for auditing government expenditure is a reference made in 1314 to the Auditor of the Exchequer.

=== Auditors of the Imprest (1559–1785) ===
In 1559 an office was set up, with responsibility for auditing Exchequer payments, called the Auditors of the Imprest.

=== Commission for Auditing the Public Accounts (1785–1866) ===
In 1785 a Commission for Auditing the Public Accounts was established by statute (the former arrangement having fallen into abeyance). Its members, the Commissioners of Audit, were five in number (increased to ten in 1806). The Commissioners worked closely with the Comptroller of the Exchequer (who was charged with controlling the issue of funds to the government) following the establishment of that office in 1834.

=== Exchequer and Audit Department (1867–1984) ===
Under the terms of the Exchequer and Audit Departments Act 1866, the offices of the Comptroller of the Exchequer and the Commissioners of Audit were merged and their duties vested in a new official: the Comptroller and Auditor General (formally the Comptroller General of the Receipt and Issue of Her Majesty's Exchequer and Auditor General of Public Accounts).

=== National Audit Office (1984–present) ===
The NAO developed from the former Exchequer and Audit Department (founded in 1866) in 1983 as the auditor for central government. Crucially, the new NAO was distinct from its predecessor because it was put fully under the authority of Parliament, with the Comptroller and Auditor General made an officer of the House and it was given the right to report to Parliament itself (previously, the E&AD could only report when the departments decided to publish their accounts)..

Whereas the E&AD's powers derived from the fact that it checked that the government had only spent the money Parliament offered it in the manner that Parliament had commanded the government to do, the NAO had a more expansive remit. The E&AD had long been interested in questions of the waste of public money, the 1983 act, for the first time, codified that the auditor could report on the efficiency, economy and effectiveness of public spending..

However, although the NAO's tasks in legislation have remained the same, since the 1980s, Comptrollers and Auditors General have interpreted that mandate very differently. Under Sir John Bourn, the NAO produced reports that were often heavy on research and produced original data whereas his successors Lord Morse and Gareth Davies have been much more managerially focussed. The NAO's remit has been shaped by context as well as by the C&AGs: for example, during Brexit, the NAO was cautious about making sure that it contributed without being drawn into the battle and MPs like Margaret Hodge or Richard Bacon have had a huge impact on the type of work that is done by the NAO

== Structure ==
The NAO is based in London and Newcastle and has a staff of 800. Part of the NAO's London Office is a listed building, originally built for Imperial Airways as their "Empire Terminal". The building underwent a £60m restoration and refurbishment, completed in 2009. The NAO rents part of its offices to tenants, generating income of £1.1m in 2019–20. The building is a modern, open plan office and the refurbishment enabled the NAO to introduce many environmentally friendly features, such as rain-water harvesting.

The NAO is structured into Directorates, each with a responsibility for a government department (for instance, the Home Office or Department for Culture, Media and Sport). Each Directorate contains 20–30 staff, many of whom are qualified accountants or in training for qualification with the Institute of Chartered Accountants in England and Wales (ICAEW). Within Directorates, staff will be split between Financial Audit and Value for Money work and include staff of the following grades:

- Analyst: Junior researcher on a value for money engagement;
- Assistant Auditors: auditors employed on a three-year training contract, leading to a qualification with the ICAEW;
- Auditors: auditors that have completed their ICAEW exams but have not yet obtained the full qualification;
- Senior analyst: Oversees value for money studies;
- Audit Principals: senior auditors, with responsibility for leading a financial audit engagement;
- Audit Managers (Civil Service equivalent Grade 7): oversee a portfolio of audit engagements or a value for money studies;
- Director: (Civil Service equivalent Grade 5/SCS 1): responsibility for a directorate.

Above director grade, Directors General have responsibility for specific cross NAO functions (such as Audit Practice and Quality, and Finance and Commerce) and Executive Leaders (previously Assistant Auditors General) support the Board.

The NAO has finance, human resource and ICT functions to support its operations.

=== Governance ===
Following the controversy over a previous C&AG's expenses (see Criticisms) the governance arrangements of the NAO were overhauled and a Board was put in place to oversee the running of the organisation. The Board is made up of

- Non-executive chairman – Fiona Reynolds
- Comptroller and Auditor General – Gareth Davies
- Chief operating officer responsible for the day-to-day running of the NAO – Rebecca Sheeran
- Executive Leaders
- External board members

== Criticisms ==
Some of the criticisms that have been levelled at the NAO include the following:

- Strategic nature of reports: the NAO produces a wide range of reports on all aspects of central government expenditure, but many of these deal with marginal topics like government leaflets, countryside rights of way and railway stations. David Walker of The Guardian argues that the NAO does not and cannot examine major strategic issues such as the underlying principles of the Private Finance Initiative.
- Treatment of value for money in reports: the NAO uses a broad brush definition of 'value for money' to plan and carry out its reports. The reports do not focus purely on detailed financial analysis of whether or not a particular scheme or initiative is value for money. Instead, they include qualitative analysis of costs and benefits to give a more comprehensive assessment. In 2005, an NAO report on NHS Local Investment Finance Trust (LIFT) was criticised by one of the PAC members at the time, Jon Trickett, for its focus on qualitative analysis of the benefits of LIFT schemes and the paucity of its financial analysis.
- Expenses: in May 2007, Private Eye released information obtained under the Freedom of Information Act detailing the travel expenses of the then head of the NAO, Sir John Bourn. The Daily Telegraph subsequently reported that Bourn spent £365,000 for travel and £27,000 in restaurant bills over three years, as well as a potential conflict of interest by accepting hospitality from BAE Systems. After initially rebuffing criticisms of these issues, in October 2007 Sir John Bourn announced that he would step down in January 2008.
- The NAO was accused of hampering a police investigation into the Al Yamamah deal by several MPs in July 2006.
- Whilst the NAO's role as the auditor public spending is often praised, there have been criticisms of the accounts it audits from Parliament and academics in recent years.

== See also ==
- Whole of Government Accounts
- Other "Supreme audit institutions" (for a full list, see International Organization of Supreme Audit Institutions):
- There are other public sector auditing bodies in the United Kingdom:
  - Wales Audit Office
  - Audit Scotland
  - Northern Ireland Audit Office

== Sources ==
- Audit, Accountability and Government White & Hollingsworth, Oxford University Press (1999)
- A history of British National Audit: the pursuit of accountability Dewar & Funnell, Oxford University Press (2017)
- Holding government to account: democracy and the National Audit Office Midgley, Ferry & Murphie, [Routledge] (2024
