= Lists of landmark court decisions =

Landmark court decisions, in present-day common law legal systems, establish precedents that determine a significant new legal principle or concept, or otherwise substantially affect the interpretation of existing law. "Leading case" is commonly used in the United Kingdom and other Commonwealth jurisdictions instead of "landmark case", as used in the United States.

In Commonwealth countries, a reported decision is said to be a leading decision when it has come to be generally regarded as settling the law of the question involved. In 1914, Canadian jurist Augustus Henry Frazer Lefroy said "a 'leading case' [is] one that settles the law upon some important point".

A leading decision may settle the law in more than one way. It may do so by:

- Distinguishing a new principle that refines a prior principle, thus departing from prior practice without violating the rule of stare decisis;
- Establishing a "test" (that is, a measurable standard that can be applied by courts in future decisions), such as the Oakes test (in Canadian law) or the Bolam test (in English law).
- Sometimes, with regard to a particular provision of a written constitution, only one court decision has been made. By necessity, until further rulings are made, this ruling is the leading case. For example, in Canada, "[t]he leading case on voting rights and electoral boundary readjustment is Carter. In fact, Carter is the only case of disputed electoral boundaries to have reached the Supreme Court." The degree to which this kind of leading case can be said to have "settled" the law is less than in situations where many rulings have reaffirmed the same principle.

== Landmark decisions in Australia ==
Decisions in leading cases in Australia have usually been made by the High Court of Australia, although historically some have been made by the Judicial Committee of the Privy Council in London.

- Amalgamated Society of Engineers v Adelaide Steamship Co. Ltd. (Engineers' Case) (1920): Rejected the doctrines of implied intergovernmental immunities and reserved State powers and determined that each head of federal power should be interpreted simply on the words of the grant.
- Re Judiciary and Navigation Acts (1921): dealt with what is a matter for the court and what the court can hear.
- Bank of New South Wales v Commonwealth (1948) (Bank Nationalisation Case): the Chifley government's legislation to nationalise Australia's private banks was unconstitutional.
- Australian Communist Party v Commonwealth (1951) (Communist Party Case): the Menzies government's legislation to ban the Communist Party of Australia was unconstitutional.
- Commonwealth v Tasmania (1983) (Tasmanian Dams Case): the Hawke government was able to invoke its external affairs power to give effect to Australia's obligations under international law, including to prevent the construction of the Franklin Dam in a World Heritage Zone.
- Eddie Mabo & Ors v The State of Queensland (No.2) (1992): native title was protected by the common law in Australia and the concept of terra nullius was not valid.
- Dietrich v The Queen (1992): Australians accused of serious offences have a limited right to legal representation in order to guarantee a fair trial.
- Plaintiff M70/2011 v Minister for Immigration and Citizenship (2011) (Malaysian Solution Case) the High Court held that refugees could not be deported to countries that did not meet certain human rights protection standards.
- Commonwealth v Australian Capital Territory (2013) (Same-Sex Marriage Case): only the Commonwealth had the necessary legislative head of power to reform marriage laws to encompass same-sex marriage.
- Williams v Commonwealth (2012) and Williams v Commonwealth (No 2) (2014) (School Chaplains Cases): the Commonwealth did not have the necessary constitutional head of legislative power to fund the National School Chaplaincy Programme.
- NZYQ v Minister for Immigration (2023): overturned Al-Kateb v Godwin – indefinite detention of non-citizens that have no realistic prospect of removal from Australia in the foreseeable future is unlawful due to its punitive nature and violation of the separation of powers.

== Landmark decisions in Canada ==
There is no universally agreed-to list of "leading decisions" in Canada.

One indication, however, as to whether a case is widely regarded as being "leading" is its inclusion of the ruling in one or more of the series of compilations prepared over the years by various authors. One of the earlier examples is Augustus Henry Frazer Lefroy's Leading Cases in Canadian Constitutional Law, published in 1914. More recently, Peter H. Russell and a changing list of collaborators have published a series of books, including:

- Leading Constitutional Decisions (first published 1965, with several later editions);
- Federalism and the Charter: Leading Constitutional Decisions (published in 1989, co-edited by Russell, F.L. Morton and Rainer Knopff);
- The Court and the Charter: Leading Cases (published in 2008, co-edited by Russell, Morton, Knopff, Thomas Bateman and Janet Hiebert); and
- The Court and the Constitution: Leading Cases (published in 2008, co-edited by Russell, Morton, Knopff, Bateman and Hiebert).

Decisions in leading cases in Canada have usually been made by the Supreme Court of Canada. Prior to the abolition of appeals of Supreme Court decisions in the 1940s, most landmark decisions were made by the Judicial Committee of the Privy Council in London.

Decision	Court	Date & citation	Subject matter	Principle or rule established by the court's decision	Full text
Robertson and Rosetanni v R	Supreme Court	[1963] SCR 651	Canadian Bill of Rights	Establishes that the Bill of Rights is not concerned with rights in any abstract sense, but rather with the more modest objective of prohibiting restrictions on rights as they existed in Canada at the time the Bill of Rights was enacted.	
Reference Re Anti-Inflation Act	Supreme Court	[1976] 2 SCR 373	Use of extraneous material in court decisions.	Established that it is acceptable for Canadian courts to examine historical material in addition to the text of the relevant statute.	
Patriation Reference	Supreme Court	[1981] 1 SCR 753	Constitutional conventions	Establishes that constitutional conventions are not legally binding.	
Quebec (AG) v Blaikie (No 1)	Supreme Court	[1979] 2 SCR 1016	Status of English and French in Quebec legislation.	Established that all laws and regulations of the province of Quebec, as well as all courts and tribunals, must treat French and English with absolute equality.	
R v Sparrow	Supreme Court	[1990] 1 SCR 1075	Constitution Act, 1982, section 35(1) (Aboriginal rights)	Establishes that aboriginal rights that pre-exist the Constitution Act, 1982 cannot be infringed without justification.	.
Delgamuukw v British Columbia	Supreme Court	[1997] 3 SCR 1010	Constitution Act, 1982, section 35(1) (Aboriginal rights)		
R v Marshall	Supreme Court	[1999] 3 SCR 456	Constitution Act, 1982, section 35(1) (Aboriginal rights)	Establishes that aboriginal treaty rights are subject to Canadian law, but not to provincial licensing systems.	R v Marshall (No 1)R v Marshall (No 2)
Tsilhqot'in Nation v British Columbia	Supreme Court	2014 SCC 44	Constitution Act, 1982, section 35(1) (Aboriginal rights)	Established land title for the Tsilhqot'in First Nation.	
Reference Re BC Motor Vehicle Act	Supreme Court	[1985] 2 SCR 486	Charter of Rights, section 7 (Legal rights)	Establishes that laws which impose prison sentences for "absolute liability" offences (i.e. offences for which intent or negligence need not be shown) are invalidated by section 7 of the Charter.	
R v Morgentaler	Supreme Court	[1988] 1 SCR 30	Charter of Rights, section 7 (Legal rights), abortion	The abortion provision in the Criminal Code violated the right of women, under section 7 of the Charter to "security of the person".	
Gosselin v Quebec (AG)	Supreme Court	2002 SCC 84	Charter of Rights, section 7 (Legal rights)	Establishes that section 7 does not mandate positive rights to welfare benefits, but that "a positive obligation to sustain life, liberty or security of the person may be made out" under different circumstances than those of the instant case.	
Andrews v Law Society of British Columbia	Supreme Court	[1989] 1 SCR 143	Charter of Rights, section 15 (Equality rights)	Establishes the "Andrews test" for determining whether Charter-protected equality rights have been violated.	
Hunter v Southam Inc	Supreme Court	[1984] 2 SCR 145	Charter of Rights, section 8 (Legal rights)	Establishes that the Charter ought to be interpreted purposively.	
R v Feeney	Supreme Court	[1997] 2 SCR 13	Constitution Act, 1982, section 8 (Procedural rights)	Establishes that the police cannot enter a home without a search warrant.	
Egan v Canada	Supreme Court	[1995] 2 SCR 513	Charter of Rights, section 15(1) (Equality rights)	Establishes that discrimination on the basis of sexual orientation is prohibited under section 15(1).	
Law v Canada (Minister of Employment and Immigration)	Supreme Court	[1999] 1 SCR 497	Charter of Rights, section 15(1) (Equality rights)	Establishes the "Law test" for identifying Charter-prohibited discrimination.	
Canada (AG) v Hislop	Supreme Court	2007 SCC 10	Charter of Rights, section 15 (Equality rights)	Establishes that Charter-mandated rights come into existence, for purposes of applicability, only from the moment that their existence is determined by the court. Charter rights are not "discovered" in the sense proposed by Blackstone, and therefore are not retroactive.	
Ford v Quebec (AG)	Supreme Court	[1988] 2 SCR 712	Charter of Rights, section 2(b) (Freedom of expression)		
Irwin Toy Ltd v Quebec (AG)	Supreme Court	[1989] 1 SCR 927	Charter of Rights, section 2(b) (Freedom of expression)		
R v Zundel	Supreme Court	[1992] 2 SCR 731	Charter of Rights, section 2(b) (Freedom of expression)		
R v Sharpe	Supreme Court	2001 SCC 2	Charter of Rights, section 2(b) (Freedom of expression)		
Mahe v Alberta	Supreme Court	[1990] 1 SCR 342	Charter of Rights, section 23 (Minority-language education rights)	Establishes that section 23 of the Charter is intended to be remedial, and therefore should be given a large and liberal interpretation.	
R v Oakes	Supreme Court	[1986] 1 SCR 103	Charter of Rights, section 1 (limits on rights protected elsewhere in the Charter)	Establishes the "Oakes test" determining whether laws placing limits on Charter-protected rights are permitted under section 1 of the Charter.	
Meiorin	Supreme Court	[1999] 3 SCR 3	Charter of Rights, section 15(1) (Equality rights)	Establishes the "Meiorin test" to be used in applying human rights legislation.	.
Auton (Guardian ad litem of) v British Columbia (AG)	Supreme Court	2004 SCC 78	Charter of Rights, section 15 (Equality rights)	Establishes that section 15 of the Charter does not create a positive right to receive government services.	

== Landmark decisions in India ==
The Supreme Court of India, which is the highest judicial body in India, has decided many leading cases of Constitutional jurisprudence, establishing Constitution Benches for hearing the same. Given below are a list of some leading cases:

- Kesavananda Bharati Sripadagalvaru & Ors. v. State of Kerala & Anr., (W.P. (C) 135 of 1970), was a case in which the Court formally adopted the Basic structure doctrine.
- Three Judges Cases (in which the Court established precedent regarding appointment of judges while ensuring absolute independence of the judiciary from the Legislature and the Executive):
1. S.P. Gupta v. Union of India & Anr. (Transfer Case (civil) 19 of 1981; 1982 2 SCR 365)
2. Supreme Court Advocates-on-Record Association & Anr. v. Union of India (W.P. (C) 1303 of 1987)
3. In re Special reference 1 of 1998
- Justice K. S. Puttaswamy (Retd.) & Anr. v. Union of India & Ors. (W.P. (C) 494 of 2012), wherein the Court held that Right to Privacy was a fundamental right under the Constitution of India.

== Landmark decisions in Italy ==
The criminal case against the operator of the Italian fake review business PromoSalento in 2018 has been described as a "landmark ruling".

== Landmark decisions in New Zealand ==
Decisions in leading cases in New Zealand were made by the Court of Appeal of New Zealand before the establishment of the Supreme Court of New Zealand, although historically some have been made by the Judicial Committee of the Privy Council in London.

- In 1976, the Wellington Supreme Court in Fitzgerald v Muldoon and Others held that Prime Minister Robert Muldoon had purported to suspend laws in a manner contrary to the Bill of Rights 1689.
- In 1987, the Court of Appeal in New Zealand Maori Council v Attorney-General recognised the principles of the Treaty of Waitangi.
- In 2022, the Supreme Court ruled in Make It 16 Incorporated v Attorney-General that restricting 16 and 17 year olds from voting was unjustified age discrimination under the New Zealand Bill of Rights Act.

== Landmark decisions in the United Kingdom ==
Decisions in leading cases in the United Kingdom have usually been made by the House of Lords, or more recently the Supreme Court of the United Kingdom; in Scotland by the Court of Session or High Court of Justiciary; in England and Wales by the Court of Appeal or the High Court of Justice of England and Wales.

- Heydon's Case 76 ER 637 (1584) (Exchequer of Pleas): The first case to use what would come to be called the mischief rule for statutory interpretation.
- Darcy v Allein [1603] 77 Eng. Rep. 1260 (King's Bench): (most widely known as The Case of Monopolies): establishing that it was improper for any individual to be allowed to have a monopoly over a trade.
- The Case of Prohibitions (1607) (Court of Common Pleas)
- Bushel's Case (1670) (Court of Common Pleas): establishing the principle that a judge cannot coerce a jury to convict.
- Entick v Carrington [1765] 19 Howell's State Trials 1030: establishing the civil liberties of individuals and limiting the scope of executive power.
- Tulk v Moxhay (1848) 41 ER 1143: establishing that in certain cases a restrictive covenant can "run with the land" (i.e., bind a future owner) in equity.
- Hadley v Baxendale (1854) 9 Exch. 341 (Court of Exchequer): the extent to which a party in breach of contract is liable for the damages.-
- Rylands v Fletcher (1868) LR 3 HL 330: doctrine of strict liability for some inherently dangerous activities.
- Foakes v Beer [1884] 9 A.C. 605: the rule that prevents parties from discharging a contractual obligation by part performance.
- The Moorcock 14 P.D. 64 (1889): the concept of implied terms in contract law.
- Carlill v Carbolic Smoke Ball Company [1893] 1 QB 256: establishing the test for formation of a contract.
- Dunlop Pneumatic Tyre v Selfridge and Co. Ltd. [1915] A.C. 847: confirming privity of contract: only a party to a contract can be sued on it. (This principle was later reformed by statute.)
- A-G v De Keyser's Royal Hotel Ltd [1920] A.C 508: establishing that the Crown has no right under the royal prerogative to take possession of an owner's land in connection with the defence of the realm without paying compensation, and that a statute in force may prevail to regulate the exercise of an existing prerogative power.
- Donoghue v Stevenson [1932] S.C.(H.L.) 31: Lord Atkin established the neighbour principle as the foundation of the modern Scots delict (English tort) of negligence. This case used a wide ratio decidendi, which was held later as obiter, but established the principle of "duty of care.".
- Regal (Hastings) Ltd v Gulliver [1942] "UKHL 1," regarding the rule against company "directors" and officers from taking corporate opportunities in violation of their "duty of loyalty" to the company.
- Central London Property Trust Ltd v High Trees House Ltd [1947] K.B. 130: doctrine of promissory estoppel.
- Associated Provincial Picture Houses Ltd v Wednesbury Corporation [1948] 1 KB 223: establishing the concept of Wednesbury unreasonableness .
- Hedley Byrne v Heller [1963] 2 All E.R. 575: establishing liability for pure economic loss, absent any contract, arising from a negligent statement.
- Fagan v Metropolitan Police Commissioner [1969] 1 QB 43: the requirement for concurrence of actus reus and mens rea to establish a criminal offence.
- Ramsay v IRC [1982] A. C. 300: establishing a doctrine that ignores "for" tax purposes the purported effect of a pre-ordained series of transactions into which there are inserted steps that have no (commercial purpose) apart from the avoidance of a liability to tax.
- Furniss v Dawson [1984] A.C. 474: establishing that tax can be levied on the results of a composite transaction, even if steps that are only there for the purpose of avoiding tax (do not) cancel each other out.
- Council of Civil Service Unions v Minister for the Civil Service [1984] UKHL 9: the use of the royal prerogative is subject to judicial review.
- Factortame case [1990]: the European Court of Justice ruled that the House of Lords was required to suspend an "Act" of Parliament that infringed EC law.
- R v R [1991]: the House of Lords invalidated the defence of marital rape to reflect a changing view in society.
- R v Brown [1993] UKHL 19: Consent is not a valid defence to a charge of actual bodily harm or common assault.
- A and others v Secretary of State for the Home Department [2004] UKHL 56: Indefinite detention without trial was found to be incompatible with European Convention on Human Rights
- R v Chaytor [2010] UKSC 52: Parliamentary privilege does not protect Members of Parliament from criminal prosecution, not even if the alleged crime was undertaken in the course their parliamentary duties.
- R (Miller) v Secretary of State for Exiting the European Union: [2017] UKSC 5: The Government may not use prerogative powers to undertake action that would remove rights previously granted under primary legislation, and instead must introduce primary legislation to undertake such an action.
- R (Miller) v The Prime Minister and Cherry v Advocate General for Scotland [2019] UKSC 41: The prerogative power of prorogation is subject to judicial review; prorogation is unlawful if it has the effect of frustrating Parliament's constitutional obligation without a reasonable justification.

== Landmark decisions in the United States ==
Landmark cases in the United States come most frequently (but not exclusively) from the Supreme Court of the United States. United States Courts of Appeals may also make such decisions, particularly if the Supreme Court chooses not to review the case, or adopts the holding of the court below. Although many cases from state supreme courts are significant in developing the law of that state, only a few are so revolutionary that they announce standards that many other state courts then choose to follow.

== International courts ==
- List of European Court of Human Rights judgments
- List of European Court of Justice rulings
- List of International Court of Justice cases

== See also ==
- Case citation
- Lists of case law
- Test case (law)
