= Wilkie v Commonwealth =

High Court of Australia case

Wilkie v Commonwealth; Australian Marriage Equality v Minister for Finance
- Court: High Court of Australia
- Decided: 7 September 2017 – Pronouncement of orders; 28 September 2017 – Reasons for judgement delivered
- Citations: [2017] HCA 40 (2017) 263 CLR 487
- Transcripts: 5 Sep [2017] HCATrans 174; Audio-visual recording; 6 Sep [2017] HCATrans 175; Audio-visual recording

Court membership
- Judges sitting: Kiefel CJ, Bell, Gageler, Keane, Nettle, Gordon, Edelman JJ

Case opinions
- 7:0 expenditure for the Australian Marriage Law Postal Survey had been approved by Parliament and was the collection of "statistical information"

Wilkie v Commonwealth and Australian Marriage Equality v Minister for Finance, were two cases heard simultaneously by the High Court which held that the expenditure for the Australian Marriage Law Postal Survey had been approved by Parliament and involved the collection of "statistical information" that could be conducted by the Australian Bureau of Statistics. The case was heard urgently and the Court pronounced its orders on 7 September 2017, and delivered their reasons for judgment on 28 September 2017.

== Background ==
When the idea of a postal plebiscite/vote was first raised in August, several legal experts warned of concerns regarding the capacity for such an event to be held without parliamentary approval through enactment of specific legislation.

Constitutional expert George Williams described the proposal of the postal survey as a "poorly constructed vote for which [the government] doesn't have the correct [legal] procedures". Anne Twomey, a constitutional law expert from the University of Sydney expressed scepticism over the role of the Australian Bureau of Statistics (ABS) in the survey, stating that "the power of the ABS is to collect statistics...rather than opinions. Someone might therefore challenge it on the ground that it does not fall within the legislative functions of the ABS". Both experts further doubted the capacity of the Finance Minister to allocate the necessary funding ($122 million) to the ABS, considering that such a non-legislated advance to a department can only be made in "urgent" and "unforeseen circumstances". Some constitutional law experts said the survey was likely to be struck down by the courts because "[g]iven the long-running debate on same-sex marriage, it is far from obvious that it fits into these [urgent and unforeseen] categories."

The government refused to release to the public the legal advice it received, though Attorney-General George Brandis stated in an interview with the ABC 7.30 program that "we have acted on Solicitor-General's advice in which we are confident". During court proceedings, the government revealed it was investigating ways to continue with the postal survey even if the legal challenges were successful.

Two legal challenges were lodged contesting the legality of the survey with the High Court of Australia, both on the grounds of unlawful funding from legally-specified funds and unlawful operation by the ABS. The High Court agreed to hear arguments in its cases on 5 and 6 September 2017 without ordering any temporary injunction.

An additional complaint was lodged by a 17-year-old boy with the Australian Human Rights Commission in August 2017, on the basis that the rules did not allow provisionally enrolled 16- and 17-year-old Australians the right to participate in the survey. The complaint could have led to a federal court case to argue for the right of about 50,000 Australians aged 16 and 17 on the electoral roll to vote, however the boy dropped his complaint on 22 September, after a Greens amendment to the Marriage Law Survey (Additional Safeguards) Act 2017 was rejected by the Parliament earlier in the month. Legal counsel to the boy advised that the rejected amendment would make the age discrimination complaint much more difficult to argue, because parliament had considered and rejected extending the vote to enrolled 16- and 17-year-olds.

=== Argent–Marlowe–Wilkie challenge ===
Same-sex marriage advocates Shelley Argent (national spokeswoman of Parents and Friends of Lesbians and Gays) and Felicity Marlowe (member of Rainbow Families), along with independent MP Andrew Wilkie, announced they would challenge the postal survey in the High Court on 9 August 2017 and seek a temporary injunction. The Argent-Marlowe-Wilkie challenge was against the Commonwealth of Australia, Mathias Cormann, Scott Morrison, David Kalisch and Tom Rogers, the electoral commissioner. In the government's submissions to this court challenge the government responded that "[i]t is not correct to characterise the activity [of participation in the survey] as a vote." The court questioned the validity of Wilkie's claim to standing on the case by virtue of his being a member of Parliament, but did not challenge Marlowe's claim to standing as being in a same-sex relationship. Solicitor-General Stephen Donaghue, for the government, argued that this was not enough for Marlowe to bring the case.

=== Australian Marriage Equality–Rice challenge ===
On 10 August, the Human Rights Law Centre filed a legal action on behalf of Australian Marriage Equality and Greens Senator Janet Rice. The Australian Marriage Equality-Rice challenge was against Cormann and Kalisch, and argued that the provisions used by Cormann to finance the survey could only be used for ordinary government business.

== High Court judgment ==
The High Court handed down a summary ruling in both cases on 7 September 2017. The court determined that the survey was lawful, allowing it to proceed as scheduled. The challengers have been ordered to pay costs. The High Court handed down its unanimous reasons on 28 September 2017, finding that $295 million had been appropriated by parliament, and that whether the expenditure was unforeseen was a matter for the Minister's satisfaction and there was no error of law in either his reasoning or his conclusion. The information to be collected was "statistical information" of matters prescribed in the Census and Statistics Regulation 2016 (Cth). As the court had considered and rejected the grounds of the application, there was no need to decide whether or not whether the plaintiffs had standing.

== See also ==
- Williams v Commonwealth
- Williams v Commonwealth (No 2)
