= Bridewell (disambiguation) =

Bridewell is a common noun meaning jail (now archaic) and the proper name of a number of jails. Also a surname.

== Buildings ==
- Any prison in Britain or its English-speaking former colonies; especially
  - Bridewell Palace, London; later a prison, the original "bridewell".
  - a village lock-up
  - Central Police Station, Bristol, originally a bridewell
  - Bridewell Museum, Norwich
  - Bridewell Police Station, Nottingham, England
  - Clerkenwell Bridewell, London (served as prison between 1618 and 1884)
  - Tothill Fields Bridewell, Westminster, London
  - Wymondham Bridewell, Wymondham, Norfolk (served as prison between 1619 and 1878)
  - The Bridewell, former prison in Edinburgh, Scotland
  - Bridewell, 18th/19th century-New York City jail
  - Bridewell, former city jail of Chicago
  - Bridewell Garda Station, Cork City, County Cork, Ireland
  - Bridewell Garda Station, Smithfield, Dublin, Ireland

== People ==
- Ollie Bridewell (1985–2007) British motorcycle racer
- Tommy Bridewell (b. 1988) British motorcycle racer

== Other uses ==
- The Bridewells a.k.a. The Bridewell Taxis, Leeds-based British indie rock group active from 1987 to 1993

== See also ==
- Brideswell (disambiguation)
