= City Livery Club =

Members-only club in London, England

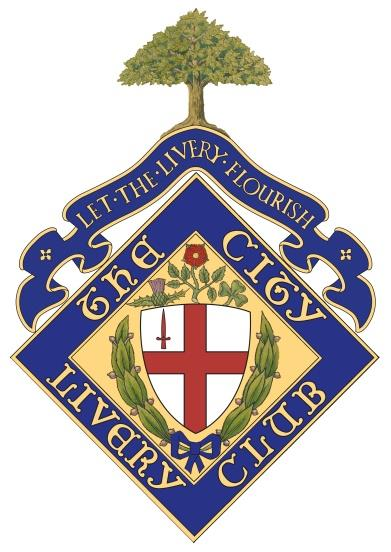
- Club Handbook Cover

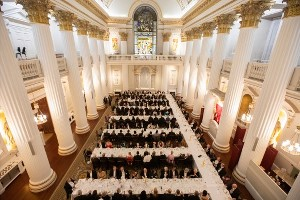
- CLC Banquet at Mansion House
- Formation: 1914
- Type: Private members' club
- Legal status: Active
- Purpose: Social, professional networking, civic engagement
- Headquarters: Bell Wharf Lane, Upper Thames Street, London EC4R 3TB
- Location: 51°30′35″N 0°05′33″W
- Region served: City of London
- Official language: English
- Affiliations: City of London, Livery Companies of the City of London
- Website: www.cityliveryclub.com

City Livery Club is a members-only club in the City of London, which was established in June 1914. It is based at Bell Wharf Lane, Upper Thames Street, London, a site that it shares with the Little Ship Club.

The club was founded "to bind together in one organisation liverymen of the various guilds in the bond of civic spirit, in service to the Ancient Corporation and in the maintenance of the priceless City Churches," and it serves as a social club for those in the City. While membership was originally open only to City liverymen, it has since grown to include liverymen and freemen of the livery companies, City of London Companies without Livery, as well as assorted categories of associate membership. The incumbent Lord Mayor of London is automatically elected patron of the club.

The City Livery Club has led something of a peripatetic existence, occupying the De Keyser's Royal Hotel on the Victoria Embankment from 1914 to 1923. It then moved to Williamson's Hotel on Bow Lane, off Cheapside, until 1927, when it moved to the Chapter House in St Paul's Churchyard. This site was bombed during the Blitz in 1940, and temporary lodgings were occupied at Butchers' Hall in Bartholomew Close between 1941 and 1944 until that too was bombed. Its post-War situation was somewhat more permanent, with the 1944 move to Sion College on the Embankment. The 1996 closure of much of the college meant that new premises had to be found – at the Insurance Hall on Aldermanbury, and the club moved again to the Baltic Exchange on St. Mary Axe in 2003. The Club next moved to Bell Wharf Lane on the River Thames, sharing the facilities of the Little Ship Club. In August 2020 the Club moved to 42 Crutched Friars where it shared the location with the City University Club. In late January 2023 the Club returned to Bell Wharf Lane on the Thames riverfront where it once again shares the splendid premises with the Little Ship Club.
