= Bristows =

United Kingdom law firm

Bristows LLP
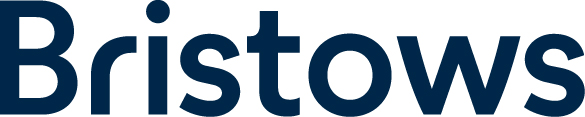
- No. of offices: 1
- No. of lawyers: 43 Partners, 4 Of Counsel, 99 Associates, 2 PSLs, 20 Trainees, 11 Paralegals (as of February 2020)
- Major practice areas: Intellectual Property, Information Technology, Corporate and Financing, Commercial and Technology Disputes, Real Estate, Regulatory, Competition and EU, Media and Marketing, Employment and Tax
- Date founded: 1837
- Company type: LLP
- Website: bristows.com

Bristows is a full-service commercial, law firm, particularly known for its technology and intellectual property work.

In January 2008, the firm relocated from Lincoln's Inn Fields to new city offices on the first two floors of 100 Victoria Embankment, London (also known as Unilever House). In May 2018, the firm opened its first international office in Brussels.

== History ==
Bristows was founded in 1837 by Robert Wilson at 1, Copthall Buildings in the City of London. One of his first pieces of work related to the patenting of the first practical electrical telegraph, then particularly in demand for its application to railways. Wilson also advised a Captain Crauford in relation to his patent "for preserving from rust" and the electronic engineer Sir Charles Wheatstone on the wheatstone bridge circuit.

In 1849, Ebenezer Bristow joined the firm. Ebenezer was a member of the Law Society Council from 1873 until 1908, and president of the Law Society of England and Wales for the year 1883 to 1884. It was during this year that the first UK Patent Act arrived, which laid the basis for modern patent law and practice.

During the 19th century, the firm acted for the Royal Mail Steam Packet, largely on litigation relating to accidents at sea. Other clients in the late 19th century include the Electric Telephone Company, Steam Plough Patents, the Bread Patents Company, the Celluloid Manufacturing Company and the Tigris & Euphrates Steam Navigation Company.

=== Early 1900s ===
The firm's name was changed to Bristows, Cooke and Carpmael in 1906, reflecting the names of the then partners.

Henry Cooke was heavily involved in patenting work, and was a member of the committee whose advice led to the Patents Act 1919. Alfred Carpmael, was a prominent patent agent of his time, and the author of the first handbook on 'Patent Laws of the World.

Around the time of World War I, the firm acted in patent litigation regarding electric light bulbs. It related to an invention by the General Electric Company of the USA that involved using filament from tungsten.

In the 1930s, the firm was involved in drafting agreements for the laying of the first transatlantic telephone cable.

Bristows began to act for The Royal Society in the 1940s. By that time, other clients in the field of learned societies and institutions include the Royal Society of the Arts, Institution of Chemical Engineers, Institution of Civil Engineers, Institution of Electrical Engineers and Institution of Mechanical Engineers.

=== Mid-1900s ===
In the 1950s, to avoid a notoriously unpredictable English judge, the firm took the unusual move of bringing a patent case in Scotland, despite the lack of experience of patent litigation there. The move, for a textile machinery manufacturer, was successful, It was closely followed by another similar case on behalf of the Jockey Company of Chicago over its invention, Y-fronts, which were being manufactured under licence in Scotland.

=== Late 20th century ===
In the 1960s, Bristows was involved in a patent case on the jet engine, Renee Anxionnaz and Societe Rateau v Rolls-Royce, De Havillands and the Ministry of Aviation, . Sir Frank Whittle the inventor of the jet engine, was the expert for Bristows and the trial lasted about five weeks.

In the 1980s Bristows handled the first ever UK biotechnology case representing Genentech in defending its patent for recombinant tPA (used in treating thrombosis).

The continuing expansion of the firm in the 1970s, and the landlords' decision to redevelop 1 Copthall Buildings, led to a move to Lincoln's Inn Fields.

In 1997 the firm advises on a joint venture between BSkyB, British Telecom, HSBC and Matsushita (now Panasonic) to create Open, the world's first digital interactive television service on Sky.

In 1998, the firm shortened its name from Bristows Cooke & Carpmael to Bristows.

=== Early 2000s ===
In 2002 Bristows represented Sony Computer Entertainment Europe (SCEE) in an action brought against "chipping" of PlayStation games consoles, and, following a six-year case against the Metropolitan Police, secured the image rights to Doctor Who's TARDIS for the BBC.

In 2003, the firm acted for Bayer AG on the £25 million financing aspects of its exclusive marketing agreement with GW Pharmaceuticals plc relating to the marketing of GW's pioneering cannabis-based medicine Sativex®. In the same year, the firm acted for VIA Technologies in a hard-fought competition law battle between leading chip producer Intel and its smaller competitor, VIA Technologies. In this case, the Court of Appeal decided that VIA Technologies can bring Intel to trial, and alleged that Intel's behaviour is anti-competitive, that the way Intel uses its huge patent portfolio seriously harms smaller rivals, and that Intel is driving rivals out of business and harming consumers.

In 2007, Bristows acted for the members of the 1980s band Frankie Goes to Hollywood who achieved victory in their dispute with former lead singer, Holly Johnson, over the trademark rights to the band's name.

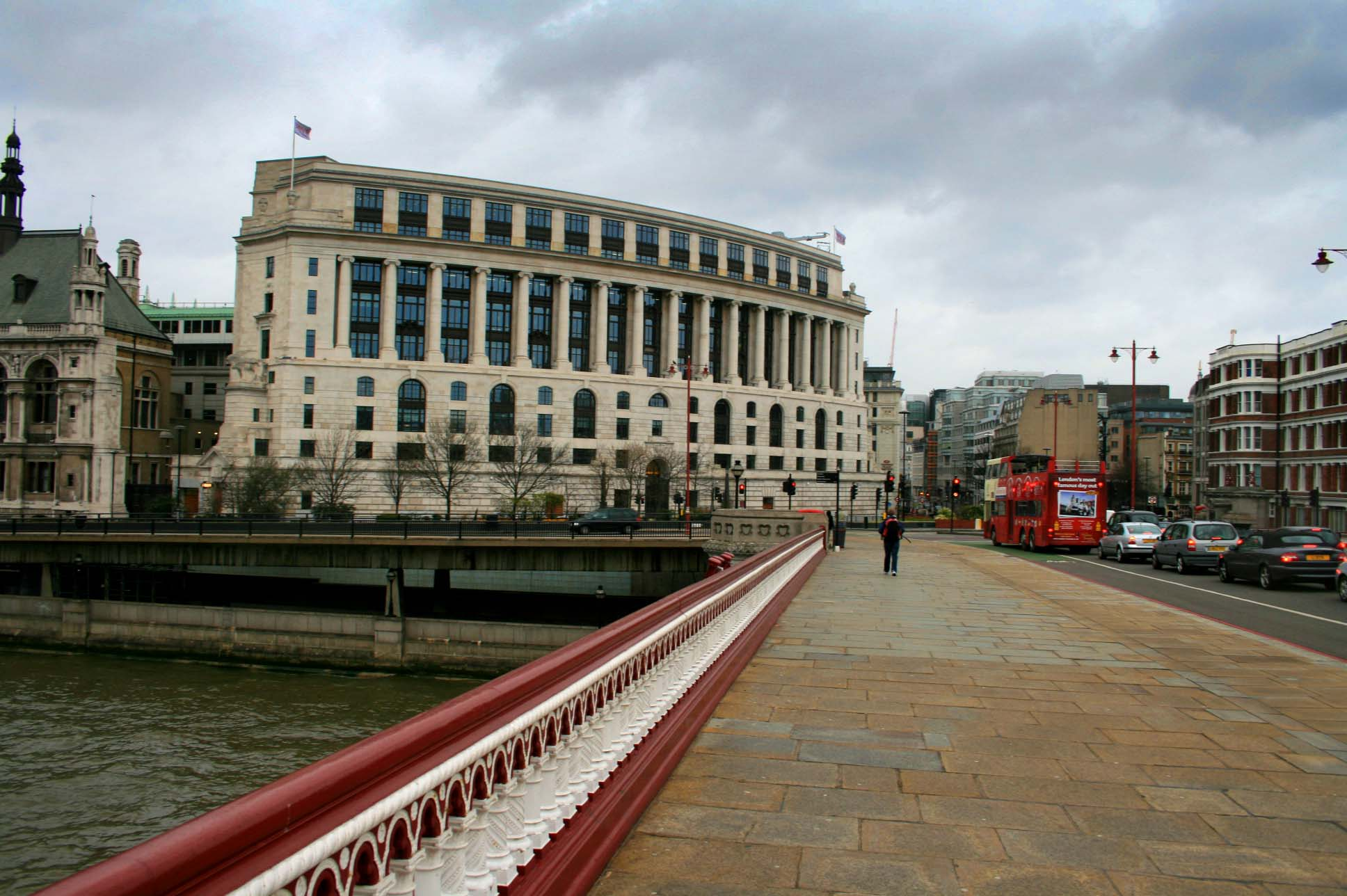
Unilever House

The firm relocated from Lincoln's Inn Fields to new City offices at Unilever House in 2008. Also, in this year, the firm acted in the first modern case addressing the principles involved in calculating the compensation payable under a cross-undertaking where the patentee obtained an interim injunction but subsequently lost at trial The firm also acted for Smith and Nephew in a patent action before the UK Court of Appeal. In an unprecedented move, the trial of the action, which started in December 2008, took only seven months from commencement to Judgment by the Court of Appeal.

Since 2009 Bristows has been advising SAS Institute Inc. on its ongoing litigation with World Programming Limited, a breach of licence and copyright infringement case which raises a number of fundamental issues regarding the scope of protection for computer software in Europe. The English High Court has referred nine questions of law arising from Articles 1(2) and 5(3) of the Software Directive in the case to the European Court of Justice for guidance. The decision of the European Court of Justice (expected mid-2012) is keenly awaited by those in the industry and the legal sector.

In 2009, the firm acted for the defendants in the first UK case where compensation has been awarded to an employee inventor. In 2010, Bristows won TMT team of the year at The Lawyer Awards 2010 for its work on the Smith and Nephew litigation mentioned above, which colloquially became known as "The Rocket Docket" for its speed from commencement to judgment. The firm also won the UK Patent Contentious Award 2010 at the Managing Intellectual Property Global Awards.

=== 2010s ===
In 2011, the firm was recognised as a 'First Class' company to work for by Best Companies, a research group responsible for compiling the Sunday Times 'Best Companies to Work For' list. In the same year, the firm advised Star Navigation Systems on a marketing/commercialisation agreement with an EADS/Airbus affiliate relating to a new form of "black box" technology for aircraft, which transmits real-time data to ground stations via satellites. Not only does this technology allow aircraft faults and aviation incidents to be investigated more quickly but also provides other benefits, such as improved scheduling for vital repairs and better aircraft route planning and fuel efficiency.

In 2011, the firm also achieved a groundbreaking win for IPCom in a telecoms patent action before the UK High Court. IPCom was sued by Nokia in April 2010 for revocation of a patent relating to a mechanism for controlling access to the random access channel, a channel used by mobile devices when accessing the mobile telephone network. IPCom countersued for infringement of the patent in June 2010 by each of Nokia's UMTS-enabled devices (UMTS is the mobile telephone standard under which the UK 3G network and UK 3G mobile devices operate). The Court upheld IPCom's patent as valid and infringed (subject to a minor amendment to the exact form of its claims).

Bristows advises L'Oreal in its ongoing trade mark infringement case against eBay. In 2011 L'Oreal won an ECJ trade mark ruling against eBay, which clarified the legal position of e-commerce platforms offering counterfeit items under famous brand names .

Bristows acted pro-bono to advise Complete Pleasure Boats on its winning bid to operate the river boat service between Putney and Blackfriars, starting 3 January 2012 and initially operating for a trial period of 6 months.

Bristows has been representing Samsung in the UK aspects of its patent dispute with Apple relating to smartphone and tablet technologies and involving parallel proceedings in ten jurisdictions.

In 2012 Bristows celebrated its 175 anniversary with a series of events and the production of a timeline looking back on it history.

In 2012 Bristows acted for Cadbury on ambush marketing strategies for the London 2012 Olympics and advised Guardian News and Media on social media product launches.

On 26 June 2012 Bristows was awarded 3rd place in the category of UK Law Firm of the Year at The Lawyer Awards.

In October 2012 the Financial Times named Bristows as one of the 'Most Innovative Law Firms in Client Service. Bristows was commended for its Global command and control system for the defence of patent rights in the pharmaceutical sector.

In November 2013 the UK's Court of Appeal handed down a judgment in the case of IPCom v HTC that is significant for the enforcement of patents in the UK. Bristows acted for the successful claimant, IPCom GmbH & Co KG, and the case concerned whether national courts should proceed with a patent dispute where the validity of the same patent is also being considered at the European Patent Office ("EPO"). The Court of Appeal looked again at the guidelines which courts should use in exercising their discretion in such cases. Lord Justice Floyd concluded that, given the tensions inherent in the European patent system, judges should maintain their ability to exercise a discretion to progress or stay a case depending upon its facts. One factor in favour of a stay would be if the patentee were likely to irrevocably gain some compensation from the defendant which might later be found to have been wrongly bestowed. If the patentee is prepared to give an undertaking to return any such money, however, then allowing the proceedings to progress in parallel could achieve at least some certainty as between the parties in a sensible timescale.

In December 2013 the Patents Court handed down its judgment in Smith & Nephew v ConvTec No. 2. Bristows acted for the successful claimant, Smith & Nephew in the most recent instalment of litigation involving ConvaTec's patent for silverised wound dressings (silver being known for its healing properties).

Between 2015 and 2020 the firm's Competition and Patent Litigation practice was involved in the first few cases related to SEP StandardEssential patent and the FRAND (Fair, Reasonable and non-discriminatory licensing) rules in the UK such as IPCom v Nokia, Unwired Planet v Huawei, Conversant v ZTE, Philips v ASUS and HTC . The firm launched a tracker tool for all cases related to the discipline in 2020.

In 2017 the full IP team from Berwin Leighton Paisner joined Bristows, two partners and seven other fee earners, complementing its Brands and trademark portfolio management practice.
