= Brideswell =

Brideswell may refer to:

- Brideswell, Aberdeenshire, Scotland
- Brideswell, County Roscommon, Ireland
- Brideswell, townland of County Dublin, Ireland
- Bridewell (disambiguation)

== Related concepts ==
- Saint Bride
- Holy well
