= Williams v Commonwealth =

2012 Australian constitutional law case

- Court: High Court of Australia
- Full case name: Williams v Commonwealth of Australia
- Decided: 20 June 2012
- Citations: [2012] HCA 23, (2012) 248 CLR 156

Case history
- Subsequent actions: Williams v Commonwealth (No 2) [2014] HCA 23, (2014) 252 CLR 416

Court membership
- Judges sitting: French CJ, Gummow, Hayne, Heydon, Crennan, Kiefel and Bell JJ

Case opinions
- (6:1) The making of payments pursuant to the Darling Heights Funding Agreement was not supported by the executive power of the Commonwealth under s 61 of the Constitution. (per French CJ, Gummow, Hayne, Crennan, Kiefel and Bell JJ; Heydon J dissenting)

Williams v Commonwealth of Australia (also known as the "School chaplains case") is a landmark judgment of the High Court. The matter related to the power of the Commonwealth executive government to enter into contracts and spend public moneys under section 61 of the Australian Constitution.

== Background ==
As part of the National School Chaplaincy Programme, the Commonwealth government entered into a contract with a company, Scripture Union Queensland, for the provision of chaplaincy services at a State school in Queensland. The contract was described as the Darling Heights Funding Agreement. Ronald Williams, the father of four children attending the school, brought proceedings in the High Court challenging the validity of the funding agreement and the consequent making of payments. Mr Williams contended that the Commonwealth did not have power under s 61 of the Constitution to enter into the funding agreement, and that the funding agreement was prohibited by s 116 of the Constitution.

The parties agreed to submit a special case stating questions for determination by the High Court. Relevantly, the questions stated in the special case raised the following substantive issues:

1. whether Mr Williams had standing to challenge the funding agreement and the making of payments pursuant to that agreement (Question 1);
2. whether the funding agreement was invalid because it was (a) beyond the executive power of the Commonwealth under s 61 of the Constitution, or (b) prohibited by s 116 of the Constitution (Question 2);
3. whether the drawing of money from the Consolidated Revenue Fund for the purposes of the funding agreement was authorised by the relevant Appropriation Acts (Question 3); and
4. whether the making of payments pursuant to the funding agreement was (a) beyond the executive power of the Commonwealth under s 61 of the Constitution, or (b) prohibited by s 116 of the Constitution (Question 4).

Questions 5 and 6 were directed to the relief to be granted.

The Attorneys-General of New South Wales, Queensland, Tasmania, South Australia, Victoria and Western Australia intervened in the proceedings, exercising the right to intervene in s 78B of the Judiciary Act 1903 (Cth). Submissions were received from the Churches' Commission on Education Inc as amicus curiae.

== Decision ==
The Court held by majority that Mr Williams had standing, and that the funding agreement and the making of payments pursuant to that agreement were beyond the executive power of the Commonwealth. Justice Heydon dissented.

The Court unanimously rejected that part of Mr Williams' challenge which relied on s 116 of the Constitution. Section 116 states that "no religious test shall be required as a qualification for any office or public trust under the Commonwealth". All members of the Court agreed that chaplains engaged by Scripture Union Queensland held no "office ... under the Commonwealth".

=== Majority judgments ===
In the majority, Chief Justice French, Justice Hayne, Justice Crennan and Justice Kiefel each wrote separate judgments, while Justices Gummow and Bell wrote together.

The majority resolved the question of standing by reference to the involvement of the Attorneys-General of the States. In particular, the majority concluded that because the States had exercised their right to intervene under the Judiciary Act, and because Victoria and Western Australia had intervened substantially in support of Mr Williams, "the questions of standing may be put to one side".

Resolution of the issues concerning the Commonwealth executive power turned on two arguments made by the Commonwealth about the scope of the power of the Commonwealth to contract and spend. First, all six members of the majority rejected a broad submission that the Commonwealth executive's power to spend lawfully appropriated money was unlimited. Secondly, four members of the majority (Chief Justice French and Justices Gummow, Crennan and Bell) rejected a narrower submission to the effect that the Commonwealth executive could spend money on any subject matter that corresponded to a head of Commonwealth legislative power, as identified in sections 51, 52 and 122 of the Constitution. The other members of the majority (Justices Hayne and Kiefel) did not reach a final view about the narrower submission; their conclusion was that, even if the submission was correct, no head of Commonwealth legislative power supported the Commonwealth's entry into the funding agreement or the making of payments under that agreement.

In relation to Question 3, which concerned whether the drawing of money for the purposes of the funding agreement was authorised by appropriations, the majority of the High Court held that it was unnecessary to answer the question.

=== Dissenting judgment ===
Justice Heydon concluded that Mr Williams had no standing to challenge the drawing of money from the Consolidated Revenue Fund (Question 3). However, he concluded that Mr Williams did have standing to challenge the validity of the funding agreement, and to challenge the making of payments to Scripture Union Queensland in the 2010-11 year.

Justice Heydon concluded that the Commonwealth's narrower submission – that the Commonwealth executive could spend money on any subject matter that corresponded to a head of Commonwealth legislative power – was correct. On that basis, the funding agreement and the payments made under the funding agreement were supported by the Commonwealth executive power. In particular, they were within the scope of the "provision of ... benefits to students" within the meaning of s 51(xxiiiA) of the Constitution.

== Legislative response ==
Following the High Court's decision, the Commonwealth Parliament enacted the Financial Framework Legislation Amendment Act (No 3) (Cth) in an attempt to validate contracts and payments made under the National School Chaplaincy Programme as well as hundreds of other Commonwealth spending programs. Mr Williams challenged the validity and effectiveness of that legislation in Williams v Commonwealth (No 2). The High Court unanimously held in that case that, notwithstanding the enactment of the validation legislation, the Commonwealth's entry into and expenditure of moneys under the funding agreement were beyond the executive power of the Commonwealth.
