= Council for Christian Education in Schools =

Australian religious organisation

Access Ministries
- Registration no.: ABN 59 004 240 779
- Location: Melbourne, Australia
- Region served: Victoria
- Key people: CEO - Canon Dr Evonne Paddison
- Website: accessministries.org.au

The Council for Christian Education in Schools is an Australian religious organisation which also operates under the name of Access Ministries, as an inter-denominational body providing Christian education and chaplaincy services in state schools in Victoria.

Its stated mission is the, "transforming [of] lives of young people and their communities".

== History ==
Religious instruction was an important component of the curriculum of the first school in Melbourne, established in July 1840. Over the next 80 years, forms of religious education for Victorian children were debated. The Joint Council for Religious Instruction in State Schools (the fore-runner of the Council for Christian Education in Schools) was established in 1920.

== Organisation ==
Access Ministries is supported by 11 Christian denominations: the Anglican Church of Australia; Australian Christian Churches (Assemblies of God in Australia); the Baptist Union of Victoria; Christian Brethren Fellowships in Victoria; Christian Reformed Churches of Australia; CRC Churches International; Churches of Christ in Australia; the Lutheran Church of Australia; the Presbyterian Church of Australia; the Salvation Army; and the Wesleyan Methodist Church of Australia.

The work of Access Ministries is overseen by eight board members. The CEO of the organisation is Canon Dr Evonne Paddison, who was appointed in 2006.

=== Funding ===
Access Ministries received almost $20 million in government funding between 2009 and 2012. They recorded a combined loss of $984,498 for those four years, according to documents lodged with the Australian Securities and Investments Commission. Access Ministries has said that they expected to make a small surplus in 2013.

== Services ==
=== Training institute ===
The organisation established the Access Ministries Training Institute for religious vocational training and higher education. Victorian education minister, Martin Dixon, attended the launch of the training institute.

=== Special religious instruction ===
Access Ministries is the largest provider of special religious instruction (SRI) in Victoria, and is authorised to provide it under the regulations of the Victorian Education Act. In 2011, SRI was provided to 130,100 Victorian school children in 940 schools, with the number dropping to 92,808 children in 666 schools by 2013. Access Ministries, however, claim that the figure of 666 is due to incorrect census reporting, and that in 2013, they actually provided SRI to 780 schools. The fall in attendance is largely attributed to department of education rules in August 2011, changing SRI classes from opt-out to opt-in following complaints from parents and activist groups. In term three of 2014, a further fifty schools dropped SRI.

=== Chaplaincy ===
Access Ministries provides chaplains for the National School Chaplaincy Program. All chaplains are required to have a bachelor's degree in theology or ministry, education, counselling or pastoral care, coupled with tertiary qualifications or experience in the other applicable areas.

== Support ==
In 2014, David Hastie, director of Cambridge International Courses at Presbyterian Ladies' College, Sydney, has said that while there has been a campaign against the services provided by Access Ministries, claims there has been a rise in enrolments in religious schools, along with strong support for SRI and school chaplaincy programs. That same year, Tim Costello, who taught religious education in a Victorian state school and supports faith-based religious education in public schools, has said in relation to Access Ministries, "if the vehicle is wrong, we can amend that rather than throwing the baby out with the bath water".

Following several complaints about Access Ministries, in September 2011, the Uniting Church declined to vote on a proposal to continue supporting them.

== Criticisms ==
=== Volunteer training ===
Complaints have been made that Access Ministries provides inadequate training to its volunteers. Volunteers pay Access Ministries $15 for six hours of training in order to qualify to teach SRI to children, compared to the three to four year degree required for teachers. Dr Marion Maddox, a member of the Uniting Church, professor at Macquarie University and expert on religious issues, has criticised Access Ministries volunteers for being under qualified.

=== Allegations of proselytising and bias ===
Access Ministries have been accused of proselytising in public schools on several occasions, and for presenting Christian's beliefs as facts, both of which are forbidden under government regulations. In May 2011, complaints were made after the CEO of Access Ministries stated that, "our federal and state governments allow us to take the Christian faith into our schools and share it. We need to go and make disciples". Access Ministries subsequently was questioned by Peter Garrett, then Minister for Education, who stated he was satisfied with their response and asked his department to take no further action. Gary Bouma, an Anglican priest and professor of sociology at Monash University has criticised Access Ministries' SRI curriculum for being biased, describing it as "just appalling". Dr Marion Maddox and former justice of the High Court of Australia Michael Kirby have also accused Access Ministries of presenting their beliefs in a biased manner.

In 2011, after an Anglican chaplain accused Access Ministries of bias, the Anglican Archbishop of Melbourne Philip Freier, came to their defence, stating he believes that in the vast majority of cases Christian religious education teachers give their time to teach, not to proselytise.

=== Educational content and activities ===
There has been opposition to the content and activities provided by Access Ministries. They have been criticised for teaching children unscientific creationist songs, providing children with material claiming girls who wear revealing clothes are inviting sexual assault, that homosexuality, masturbation and sex before marriage are sinful, and that anyone having homosexual feelings should seek counselling. The Victorian Department of Education investigated the complaints and ruled that they constituted a breach of policy.

Access Ministries were also criticized for a comic book which was said to imply that teachers were either too lazy or callous to help children unless God intervenes. Access removed the comic from their website after it was criticised by teachers, the Australian Childhood Foundation and Victorian education minister, Martin Dixon.
