= Aapo Selja =

Finnish playwright (1877–1940)

Aapo Selja (until 1898 Abraham Skopa, January 28, 1877 – June 18, 1940) was a Finnish playwright.

Selja was born to a working-class family and was, by trade, a painter. He participated in the labour movement and enjoyed literature, theater, and painting as hobbies. Selja got his start as a playwright at the Oulu Workers' Theater and worked until 1901 as the chairman of the Oulu Working People's Association. He began to write poetry when he was young, alongside articles for newspapers and workers' publications. Selja worked as an actor and theater manager in addition to writing comedies and, later, radio programs.

Selja was appointed an assistant reporter by Vapaa Sana, a labor movement publication in Vaasa, in 1906. He quickly left the position, however. In January 1907, he was sentenced to one year and two months in a house of correction for a string of three burglaries. Selja had entered the Vaasa-newspaper's office with the wrong keys and stolen money.

== Compositions ==
Under the name Aapo Selja:

- Siemenperunat : yksinäytöksinen huvinäytelmä. Seuranäytelmiä n:o 209. Karisto 1919, 2. painos 1922, 3. painos 1931
- Vihkimäleninki. Seuranäytelmiä n:o 267. Karisto 1926
- Äiti kulta : kaksinäytöksinen näytelmä. Seuranäytelmiä n:o 280. Karisto 1926

Under the name Aapo S.:

- Amerikasta palatessa : pilanäytelmä 1:ssä näytöksessä. Seuranäytelmiä n:o 114. Boman & Karlsson, Hämeenlinna 1904, 2. painos 1908
- Lammas kaivossa : yksinäytöksinen huvinäytelmä. Seuranäytelmiä n:o 183. Karisto 1915, 2. painos 1925
- Puoli sekuntia : kaksinäytöksinen huvinäytelmä. Seuranäytelmiä n:o 184. Karisto 1915
