= Bridewell Palace =

Formal royal residence in the City of London

Coordinates: 51°30′42″N 0°6′21″W

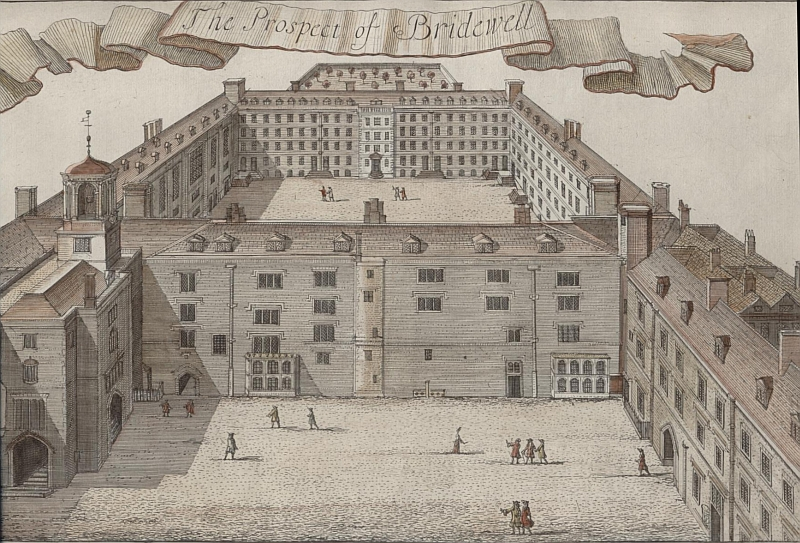
"The Prospect of Bridewell" from John Strype's An Accurate Edition of Stow's "A Survey of London" (1720)

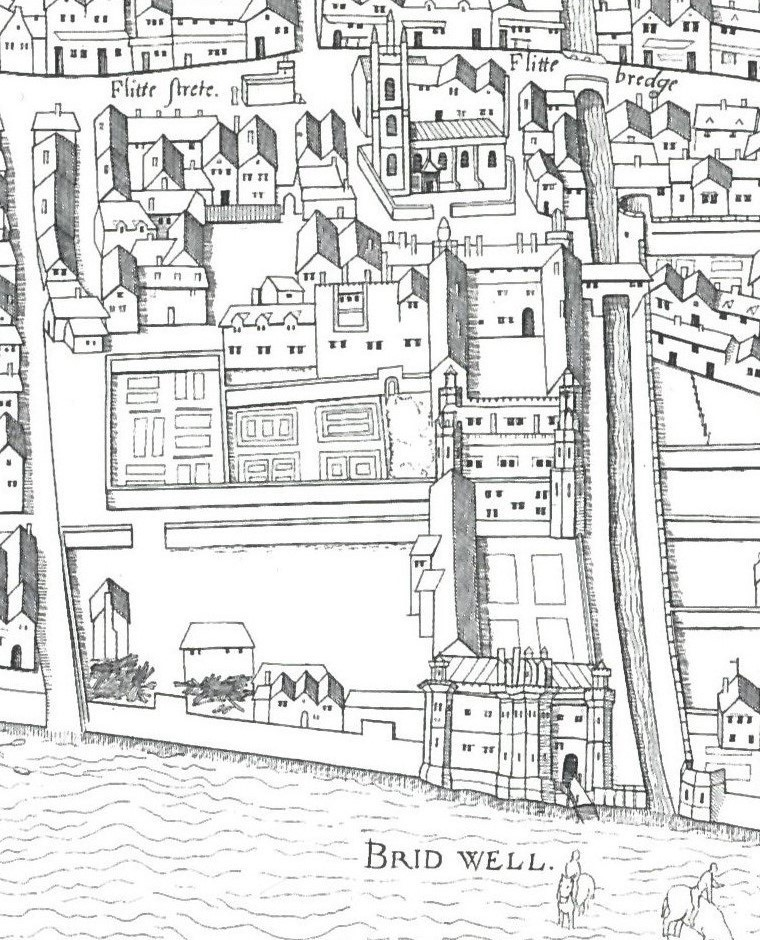
Bridewell Palace shown on the "Copperplate" map of London, surveyed between 1553 and 1559

Bridewell Palace in London was built as a residence of King Henry VIII and was one of his homes early in his reign for eight years. Given to the City of London Corporation by his son King Edward VI in 1553 as Bridewell Hospital for use as an orphanage and place of correction for wayward women, Bridewell later became the first prison/poorhouse to have an appointed doctor.

It was built on the banks of the Fleet River in the City of London between Fleet Street and the River Thames in an area today known as Bridewell Place, off New Bridge Street. By 1556 part of it had become a jail known as Bridewell Prison. It was reinvented with lodgings and was closed in 1855 and the buildings demolished in 1863–1864.

The name "Bridewell" subsequently became a common name for a jail, used not only in England but in other cities colonised by Britain including Dublin and New York.

== History ==
=== Bridewell Palace ===
The Ambassadors (Holbein, 1533): Jean de Dinteville, the ambassador to England answerable to Francis I, with Georges de Selve (Bishop of Lavaur), at Bridewell Palace

The palace was built on the site of the medieval St Bride's Inn directly south of St Bride's Church at a cost of £39,000 for Henry VIII who treated it as a main London residence 1515–1523. The privy apartments in the Old Palace of Westminster had burned in 1512 requiring a new London area residence for the king. Standing on the banks of the River Fleet, the related saint since the medieval age has been St Bride. The papal delegation had preliminary meetings here in 1528 before advising the pope on whether the King could divorce Catherine of Aragon. The building was a project of Cardinal Thomas Wolsey.

Bridewell Palace consisted of two brick-built courtyards, with the royal lodgings in three storeys around the inner courtyard. A grand processional staircase led to them from the outer courtyard. Bridewell was the first royal palace not to have a great hall and its staircase was a feature that recurs in Henry VIII's later residences. On the north side of the outer courtyard stood the kitchens and gatehouse. There was a long gallery (240 feet (73 m)) which connected the inner court with Blackfriars, issuing out at Apothecaries Hall on Blackfriars Lane which formerly ran beyond its western façade.

After Wolsey's fall in 1530, the palace was leased to the French ambassador 1531–1539, and was the setting for Holbein's painting, The Ambassadors (1533).

=== Bridewell Prison and Orphanage ===
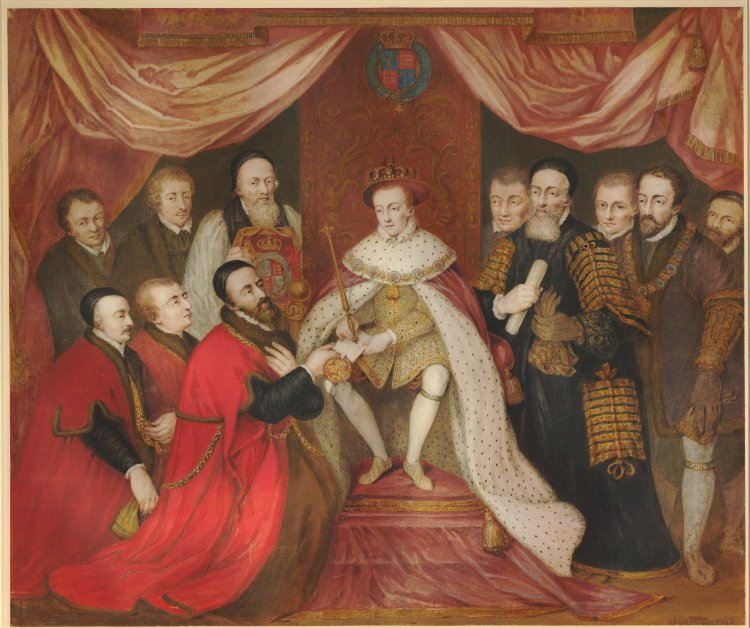
Edward VI grants a charter in 1553 to Bridewell Hospital

In 1553, Edward VI gave the palace over to the City of London for the housing of homeless children and for the punishment of "disorderly women". The City took full possession in 1556 and turned the site into a prison, hospital and workrooms. In 1557 the City authorities created a joint administration for the Bridewell and Bethlehem Hospitals when Bethlem Royal Hospital also became the responsibility of the Bridewell Governors.

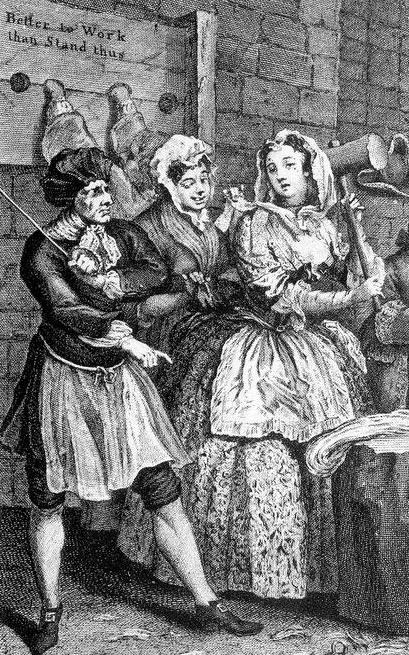
"A Scene in Bridewell", plate IV. William Hogarth, A Harlot's Progress, April 1732

In the late 17th century, the infamous London brothel keeper Elizabeth Cresswell was incarcerated in Bridewell Prison, possibly for reneging on a debt. She died there at some point between 1684 and 1698. She is probably interred in the Bridewell graveyard and legend runs that in her will she left £10 for a sermon to be read that said nothing ill of her. After considerable time, a young clergyman was found who would perform the funeral rites. After an extremely lengthy sermon on social morality, he said "By the will of the deceased it is expected that I should mention her and say nothing but what was well of her. All I shall say of her, therefore, is this — she was born well, lived well, and died well; for she was born with the name of Cresswell, lived at Clerkenwell, and died in Bridewell." (Note: The story is well sourced but probably apocryphal and there are many versions of what the clergyman's exact words.)

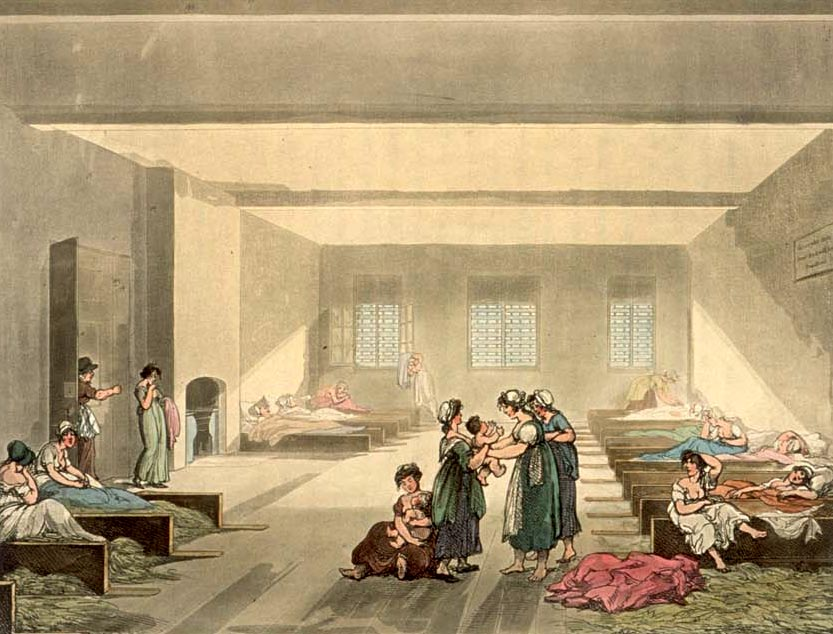
The Pass Room at Bridewell from Ackermann's Microcosm of London (1808–1811), drawn by Thomas Rowlandson and Augustus Pugin.

Most of the palace was destroyed in the Great Fire of London, and rebuilt in 1666–1667. In 1700 it became the first prison to appoint medical staff (a doctor).

=== Bridewell Royal Hospital School ===
Eventually, the prison became a school confusingly and variously known as Bridewell (Royal Hospital/School/Royal Hospital School). The prison element closed in 1855 and the buildings were demolished between 1863 and 1864. Nevertheless, some prison activities continued on the site: in the 1871 census, the Beadle and Turnkey, Joseph Ashley, had charge of two prisoners; and in 1881 Mr Ashley was still there as Collector and Beadle, but no prisoners are named. The school moved in 1867 to a much larger site in Surrey and changed its name to King Edward's School, Witley which accordingly celebrated its 450th year in 2003.

Part of the vacated site was used for the erection of De Keyser's Royal Hotel in 1874, which was requisitioned for military purposes in 1915 and became the subject of a leading case on the use of the royal prerogative decided by the House of Lords in 1920. By 1921 Lever Brothers had acquired the hotel building for use as the head office of the company's business.

=== Site today ===
A rebuilt gatehouse in the style of the original is incorporated as the front of the office block at 14 New Bridge Street, including a relief portrait of Edward VI. The main site area of the buildings stretched from there southwards through the Hyatt Regency London Blackfriars Hotel to Unilever House (built in 1931) which stands at the corner of Watergate – the name of the lost river entrance to the palace's precincts beside the former Fleet-Thames confluence (memorialised in the name of the street between the two).

=== Influence, legacy, and in popular culture ===
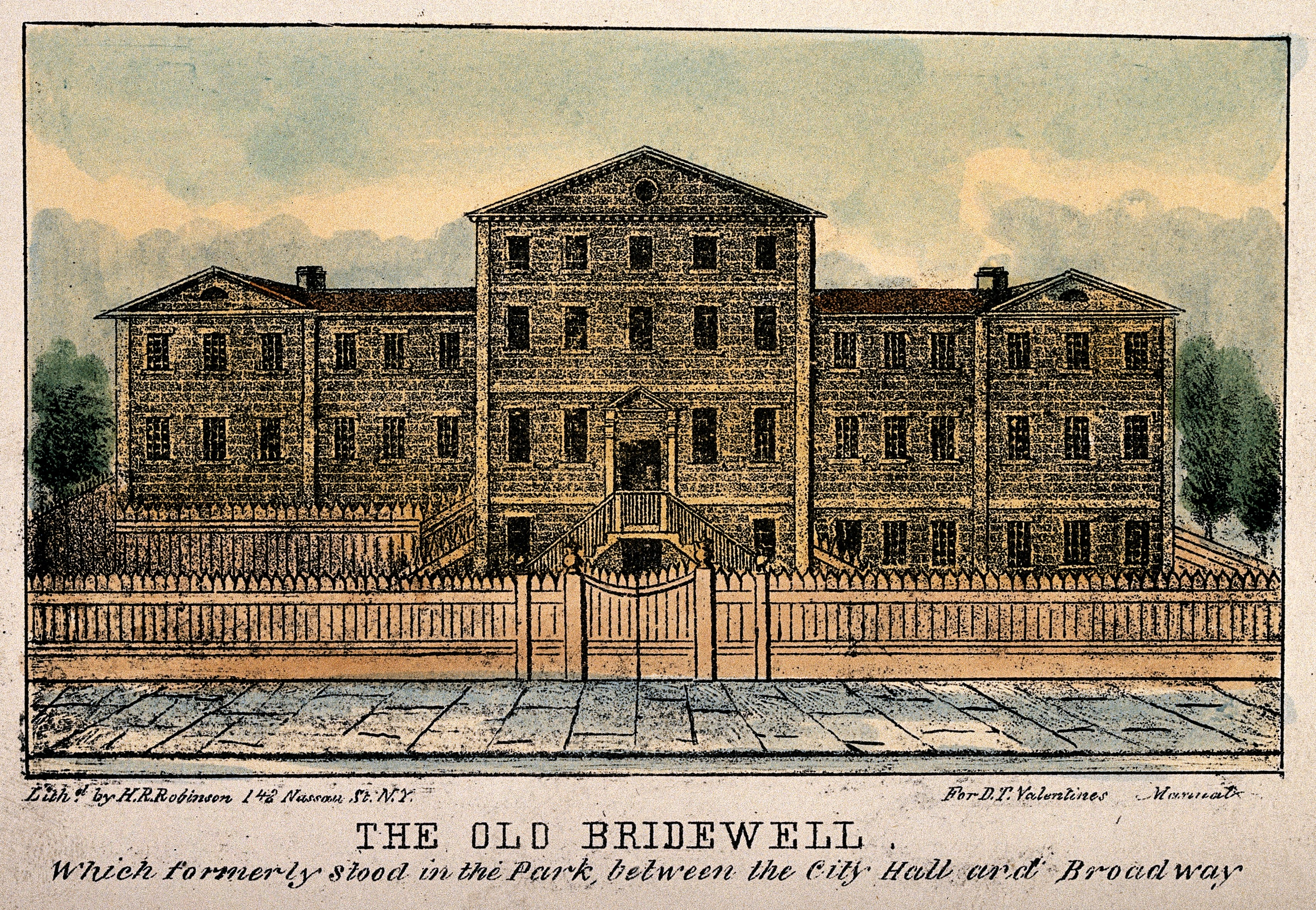
The Old Bridewell, New York City (1768–1838)

The name "Bridewell" became synonymous with large prisons and was consequently used as a generic name for them. It was adopted for other prisons in London, including the Clerkenwell Bridewell (opened in 1615) and Tothill Fields Bridewell in Westminster. Similar institutions throughout England, Ireland, Scotland and Canada as well as in the United States also borrowed the name Bridewell. The term frequently refers to a city's main detention facility, usually close to a courthouse, as in Nottingham, Leeds, Gloucester, Bristol, Dublin, Cork and Edinburgh.

In the Beatles film, A Hard Day's Night, Paul's grandfather (Wilfrid Brambell) reports the arrest of Ringo to the studio by saying "The police have the poor lad in the Bridewell – he'll be pulp by now!"

The nearby Bridewell Theatre takes its name from the palace.

== See also ==
- List of demolished buildings and structures in London
- Tom Jones
- Henry Fielding (1749)
- Bollington Bridewell (1832)
