= Attorney-General v De Keyser's Royal Hotel Ltd =

UK constitutional law case concerning the exercise of prerogative power

Attorney General v De Keyser's Royal Hotel Ltd
- Court: House of Lords
- Decided: 10 May 1920
- Citation: [1920] AC 508; [1920] UKHL 1

Case opinions
- Lord Dunedin

Keywords
- Constitutional, Damages

Attorney-General v De Keyser's Royal Hotel Limited is a leading case in UK constitutional law decided by the House of Lords in 1920 which exhaustively considered the principles on which the courts decide whether statute has fettered prerogative power. It decided that the royal prerogative does not entitle the Crown to take possession of a citizen's land or buildings for administrative purposes connected with the defence of the realm without paying compensation. It is the authority for the statement that the royal prerogative is placed in abeyance (is not used) when statute law can provide a legal basis for an action.

== Facts ==
De Keyser's Royal Hotel Ltd, as owner of a hotel situated in Blackfriars, London, claimed compensation under the Defence Act 1842 for occupation of the hotel by the armed forces during the First World War. The government relied on prerogative power under which 'less compensation would be payable'.

De Keyser's Royal Hotel was a 300–400 bedroom hotel on the Victoria Embankment, founded in the 1860s by Polydore de Keyser, that occupied the former site of Bridewell Palace. Officers of the Crown had taken possession of the hotel in 1916, purporting to act under statutory powers conferred by the Defence of the Realm Act 1914 (DORA). When challenged by the owner in petition of right proceedings, it was argued for the Crown that the competent military authority was empowered by the 1914 Act and regulations to take possession of land and buildings while the citizen had no legal right to compensation.

=== The prospects for the hotel's business ===
Before the outbreak of the war with Germany, De Keyser's had been operating as a first class hotel, mainly for a continental clientele. By the time the hotel was taken for the wartime use of the Crown in May 1916, the hotel premises were held on a set of leaseholds expiring in 1961, but due to the loss of clientele in wartime, the hotel had been running at a loss. From June 1915 the company was in the hands of a receiver and manager, Arthur Whinney, appointed by the Chancery Court for the holders of the company's debentures (bearing annual interest of about £6,000). He had proceeded to cut some of the business losses, and before the take-over in 1916 he informed the official negotiating for the Crown that the hotel's business had improved considerably and future prospects were favourable.

The company's petition of right was presented in February 1917. Before the attorney-general's fiat was given for letting the petition of right proceed, a senior civil servant informed the Home Office that the hotel company was the only party in connection with requisitioning by the Office of Works to have refused to let the claim be dealt with under the DORA regulations. In the meantime, petition of right proceedings had previously been heard by the Court of Appeal in July 1915, concerning the requisition of Shoreham Aerodrome, an airfield on the south coast, by another department, the War Office, and when the owner's appeal came to be heard by the House of Lords in July 1916, additional relevant historical information was available, resulting in an outcome that enabled the owner (The Brighton-Shoreham Aerodrome Ltd) to obtain compensation under the Defence Act 1842.

== Judgment ==
=== Court of Appeal ===
In 1919, the Court of Appeal (Sir Charles Swinfen Eady MR and Warrington LJ; Duke LJ dissenting), reversing the decision of Mr Justice Peterson in the High Court, decided that De Keyser's Royal Hotel Ltd, as the hotel's owner, was entitled to compensation in the manner provided by the Defence Act 1842.

=== House of Lords ===
On the Attorney-General's appeal in 1920, the House of Lords unanimously affirmed the Court of Appeal's decision, rejecting the government's claim to rely on prerogative power, and holding that once the statute had been enacted the prerogative powers fell into abeyance, for the duration of the life of its provisions should the statute be replaced or amended or modified.

Present at the House of Lords hearing were four Lords of Appeal in Ordinary: Lord Dunedin, Lord Atkinson, Lord Moulton, and Lord Sumner, plus Lord Parmoor (not a Lord of Appeal in Ordinary, but a member of the Judicial Committee of the Privy Council which had ruled on the case of The Zamora (1916)). At the hearing, the Crown was represented by Sir Gordon Hewart, Attorney-General, and Sir Ernest Pollock, Solicitor-General, and the other party was represented by Sir John Simon KC and Leslie Scott KC.

== Significance ==
In an introduction to an authoritative commentary published soon after the decision, Simon described it as one of the leading cases in constitutional law, concerned with establishing the rights of individual citizens in the face of exceptional interference by the Executive.

The principles established in the De Keyser's Royal Hotel case have been referred to in later judgments when the government's claim to rely on the exercise of power under the royal prerogative has been challenged, such as Laker Airways Ltd v Department of Trade (1976), concerning the revocation of the commercial airline operator's licence of Laker Airways, R v Secretary of State for the Home Department, ex parte Fire Brigades Union (1995), concerning changes to the Criminal Injuries Compensation Scheme, and most recently in R (Miller) v The Prime Minister and Cherry v Advocate General for Scotland (2019), concerning the royal prerogative to prorogue Parliament.

== See also ==
- UK constitutional law
