= Brideswell, Aberdeenshire =

Village in Aberdeenshire, Scotland

Coordinates: 57°26′28″N 2°42′1″W

Brideswell (Scottish Gaelic: Tobar Bhrìde) is a village in Aberdeenshire, Scotland. It is named in honour of Brigid of Ireland.
