= Unilever House =

Historic building in London, England

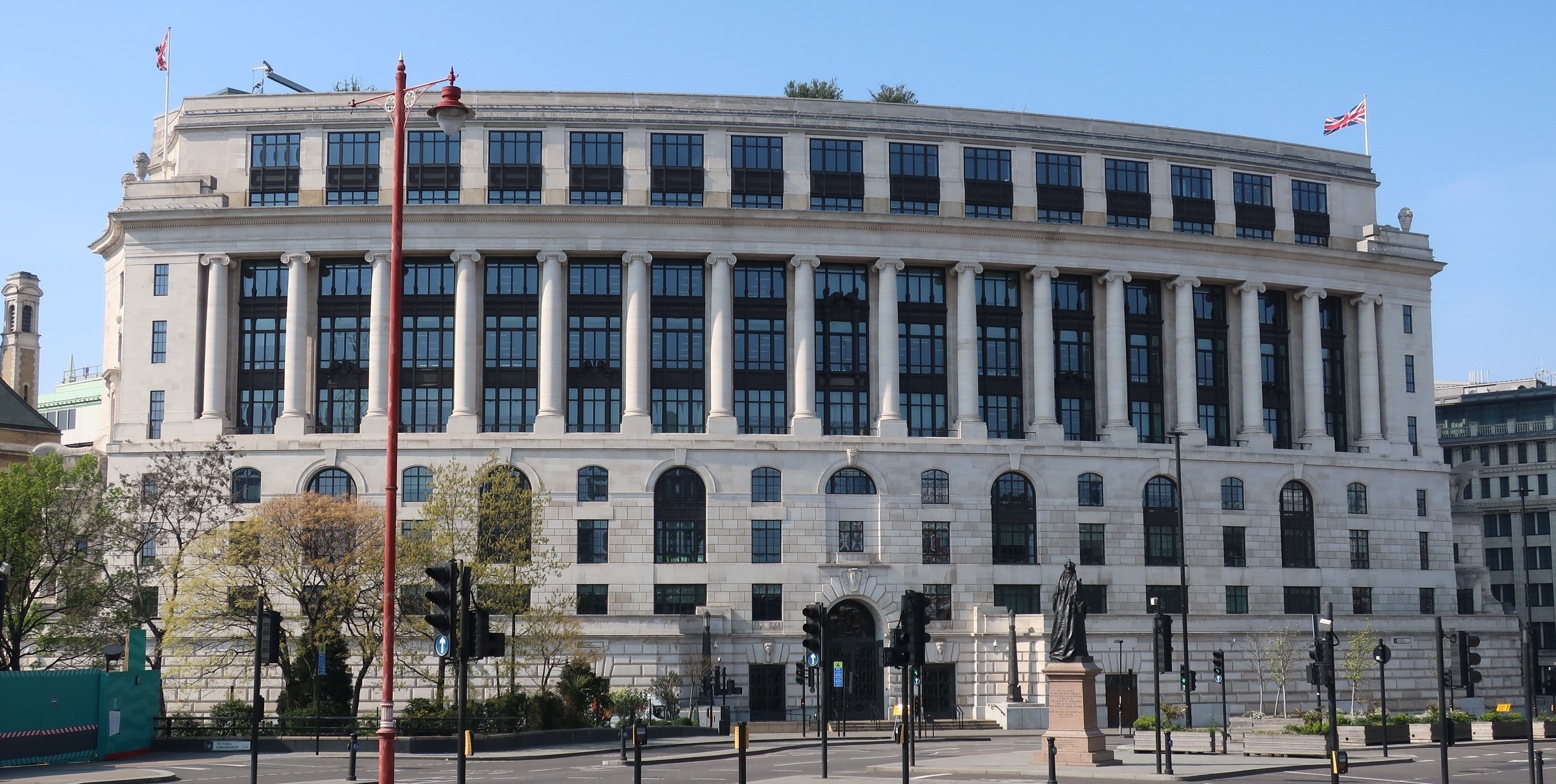
- Unilever House seen from Blackfriars Bridge
- Interactive map of the Unilever House area
- Former names: Lever House

General information
- Architectural style: Neoclassical Art Deco
- Location: Blackfriars; London, EC4; United Kingdom, 100 Victoria Embankment
- Coordinates: 51.511654°N 0.104671°W
- Current tenants: Unilever, Bristows, Royal Mail
- Construction started: 1929
- Completed: 1933; 93 years ago
- Renovated: 1977–83; 2004–07
- Owner: Unilever

Technical details
- Floor area: 385,500ft²

Design and construction
- Architect: James Lomax-Simpson
- Architecture firm: Sir John Burnet & Partners
- Other designers: Thomas S. Tait; Sculptures: William Reid Dick; Gilbert Ledward; Walter Gilbert; Eric Gill

Renovating team
- Renovating firm: Kohn Pedersen Fox Associates
- Other designers: Pringle Brandon

Unilever House is a Grade II listed office building in the Neoclassical Art Deco style, located on New Bridge Street, Victoria Embankment in Blackfriars, London. The building has a tall, curving frontage which overlooks Blackfriars Bridge on the north bank of the River Thames.

The site of Unilever House was previously occupied by Bridewell Palace, a residence of Henry VIII, which later became a poorhouse and prison. These buildings were destroyed in 1864, making way for De Keyser's Royal Hotel. In 1920, Lord Leverhulme leased the site to build the London headquarters of his soap manufacturing company Lever Brothers, which became Unilever in 1930. Construction did not commence until 1929.

== Design and construction ==
The design was a collaboration between James Lomax-Simpson, the Unilever company architect and a member of its board, and John James Burnet and Thomas S. Tait, partners in the firm of Sir John Burnet and Partners. However, there has been much confusion over the relative contributions of these architects. A note by Simpson claimed exclusive credit, suggesting that Burnet and Tait merely approved the final design; but Burnet and Tait exhibited the design as a joint work with Simpson at the Royal Academy; and drawings held at London Metropolitan Archives are signed by Burnet and Tait alone. Burnet was on the point of retiring owing to ill health; while Tait was a leading proponent of modern architecture, little of which is evident in the final design. The conclusion of Clive Aslet is that Lomax-Simpson was responsible for the overall concept (an early drawing by him dated October 1929 depicts the frontage very much as built); while Burnet and Tait were invited to become involved because of the prestige of their practice's name, but contributed only details.

The main contractor for the construction was Holland, Hannen & Cubitts.

== Architecture ==
The most striking aspect of the building is its enormous curving frontage along the Victoria Embankment, with its giant Ionic columns between the fourth and sixth floors. The heavily rusticated ground floor is windowless to reduce traffic noise inside the building. The corners are marked by entrances surmounted by large plinths on which are placed sculptures of human figures restraining horses (called Controlled Energy) by Sir William Reid Dick. Merman and mermaid figures are by Gilbert Ledward. The original lift cars were lined with art deco pewter panels designed by Eric Gill.

== Renovation ==
A refurbishment of 1977–83 saw the addition of parapet figures by Nicholas Monro and a new north entrance lobby in a Neo Art Deco style, by Theo Crosby of Pentagram. The building has been extended along Tudor Street.

In 2004, the firm Kohn Pedersen Fox Associates began renovation work in consultation with English Heritage and the City of London to make alterations to the interior work space. As part of the renovations, original fittings were retained or re-used, such as parquet flooring or Eric Gill's pewter lift car panels, but Crosby's distinctive and historically important additions were removed. A roof garden was created on top of the building.

== Gallery ==
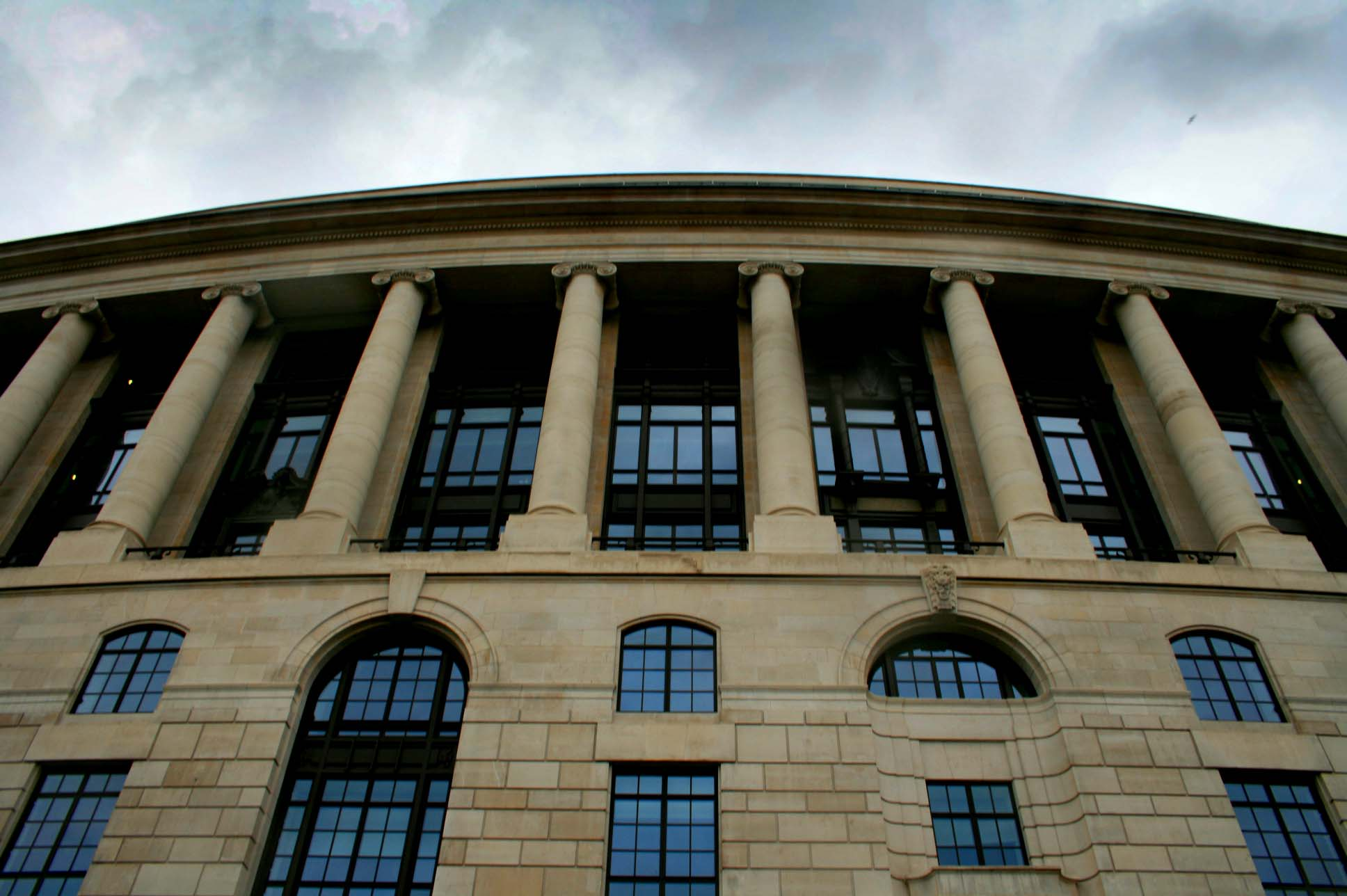
The curved Neoclassic front

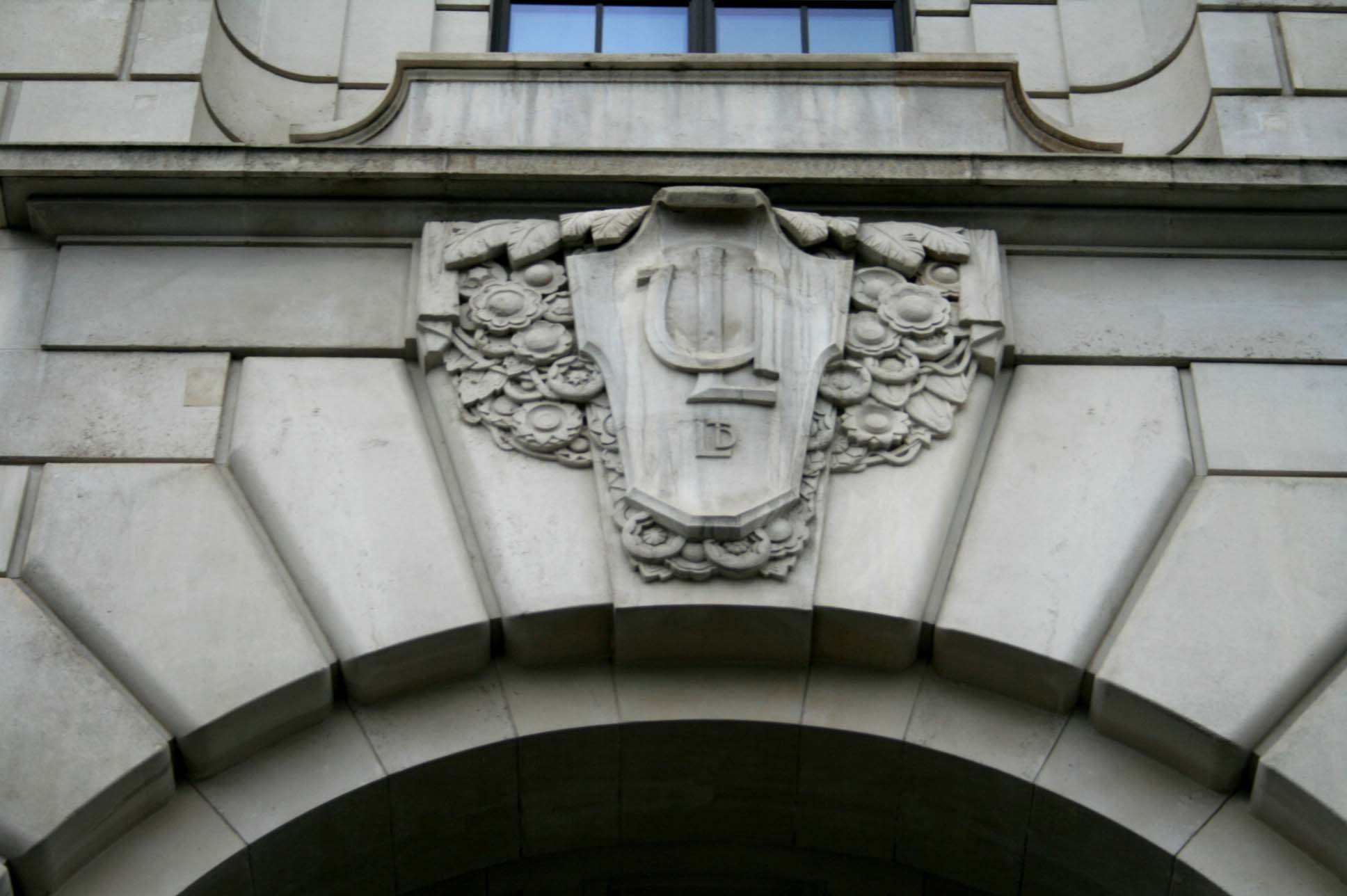
Unilever monogram

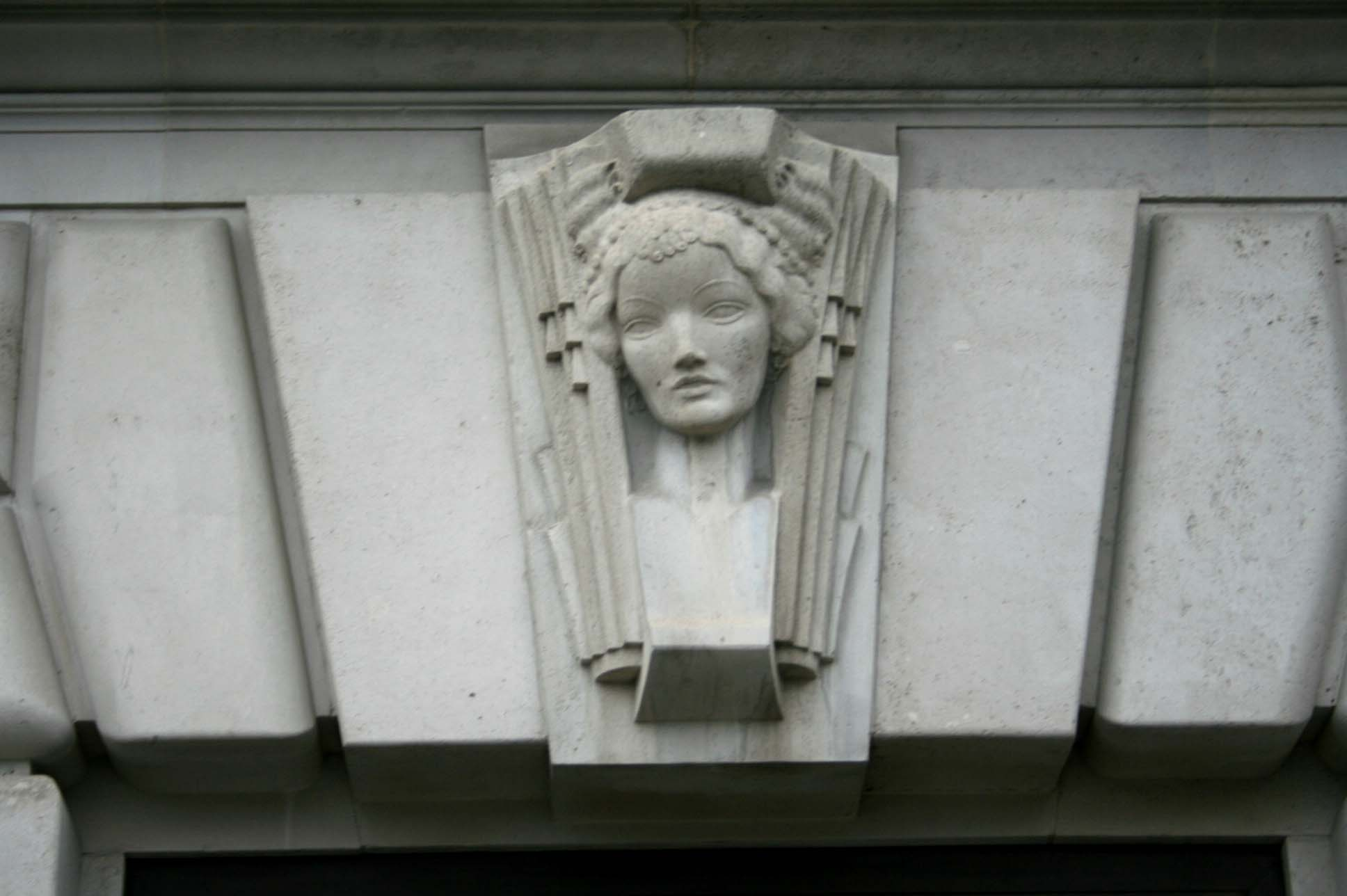
Decorative detailing

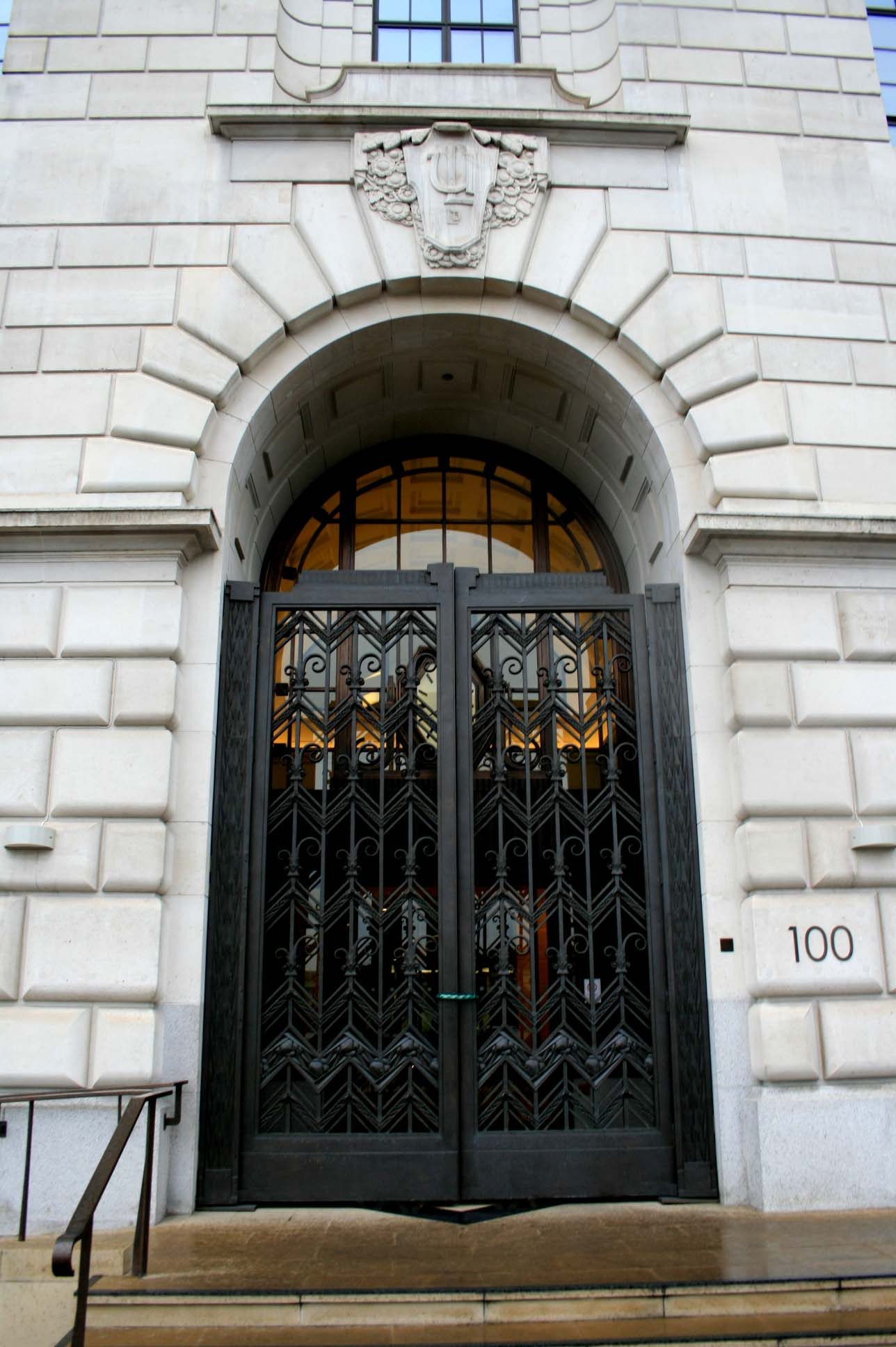
The front door

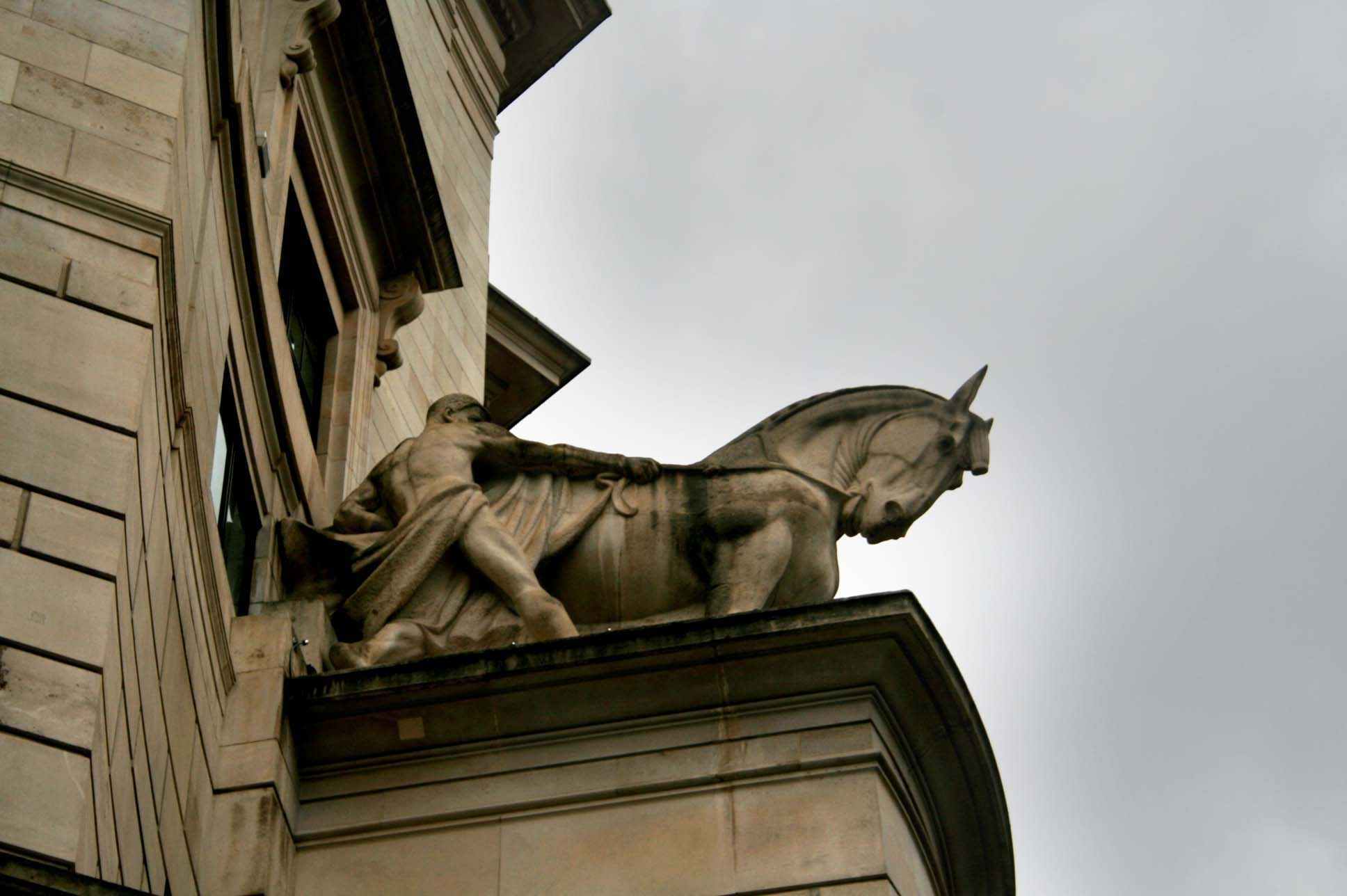
"Controlled Energy": man and horse by Sir William Reid Dick

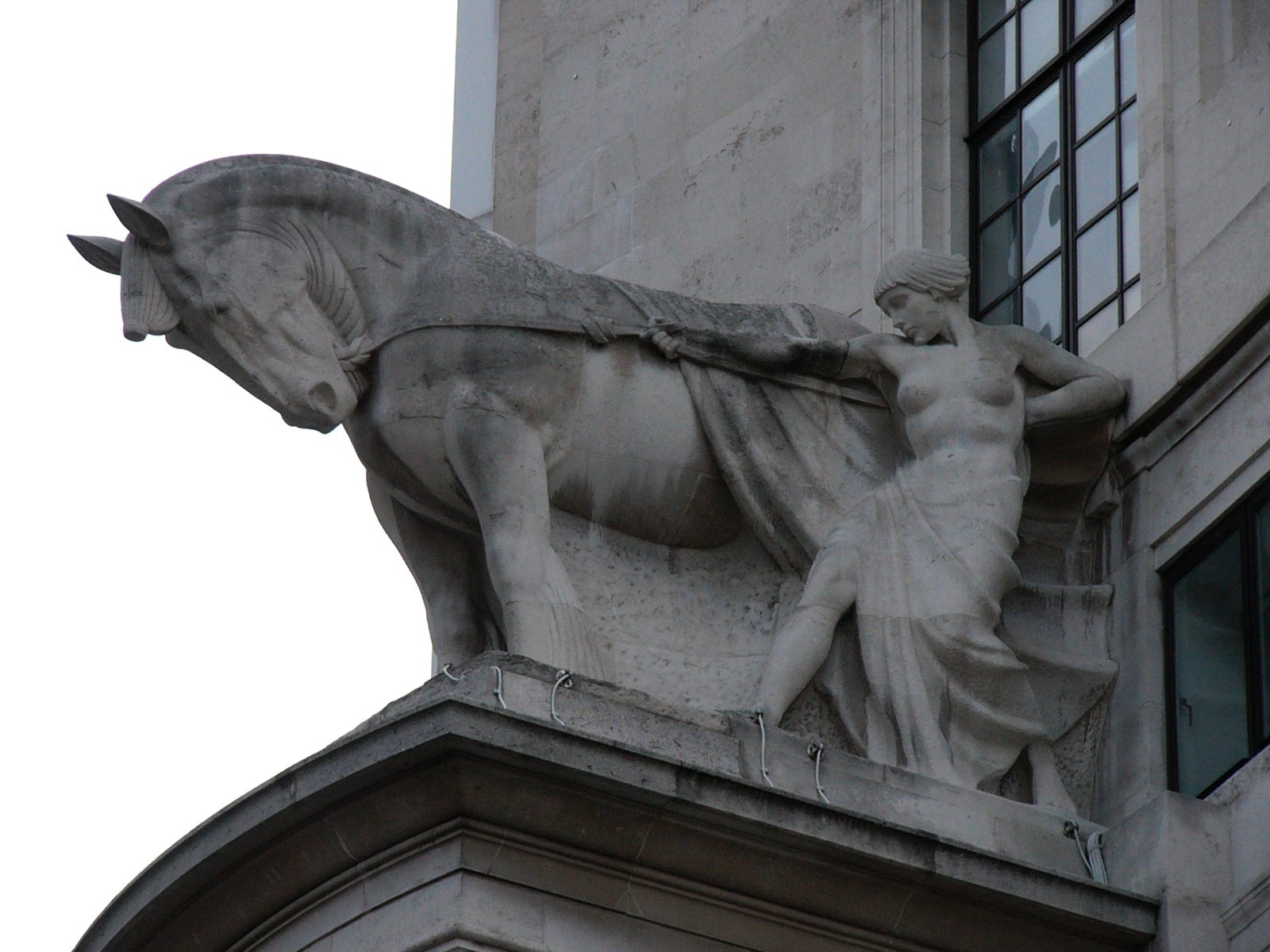
"Controlled Energy": woman and horse by Sir William Reid Dick

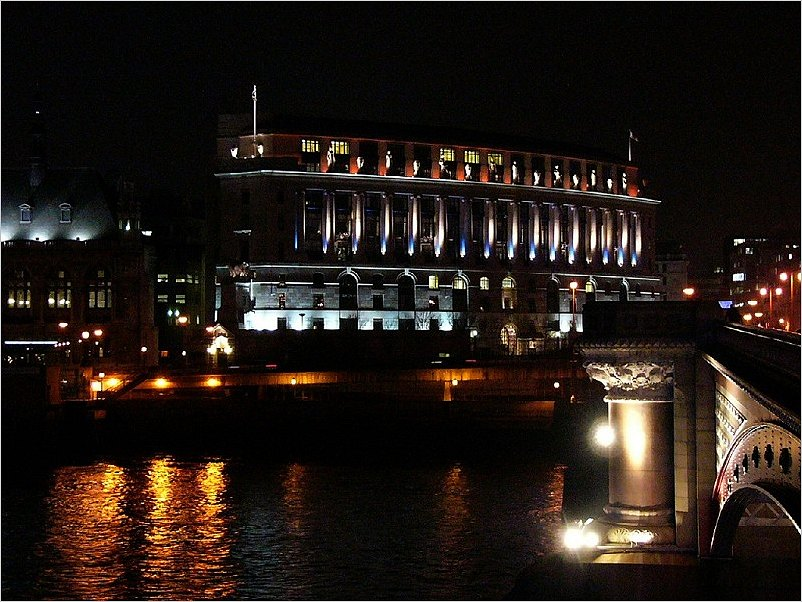
Unilever House and Blackfriars Bridge at night

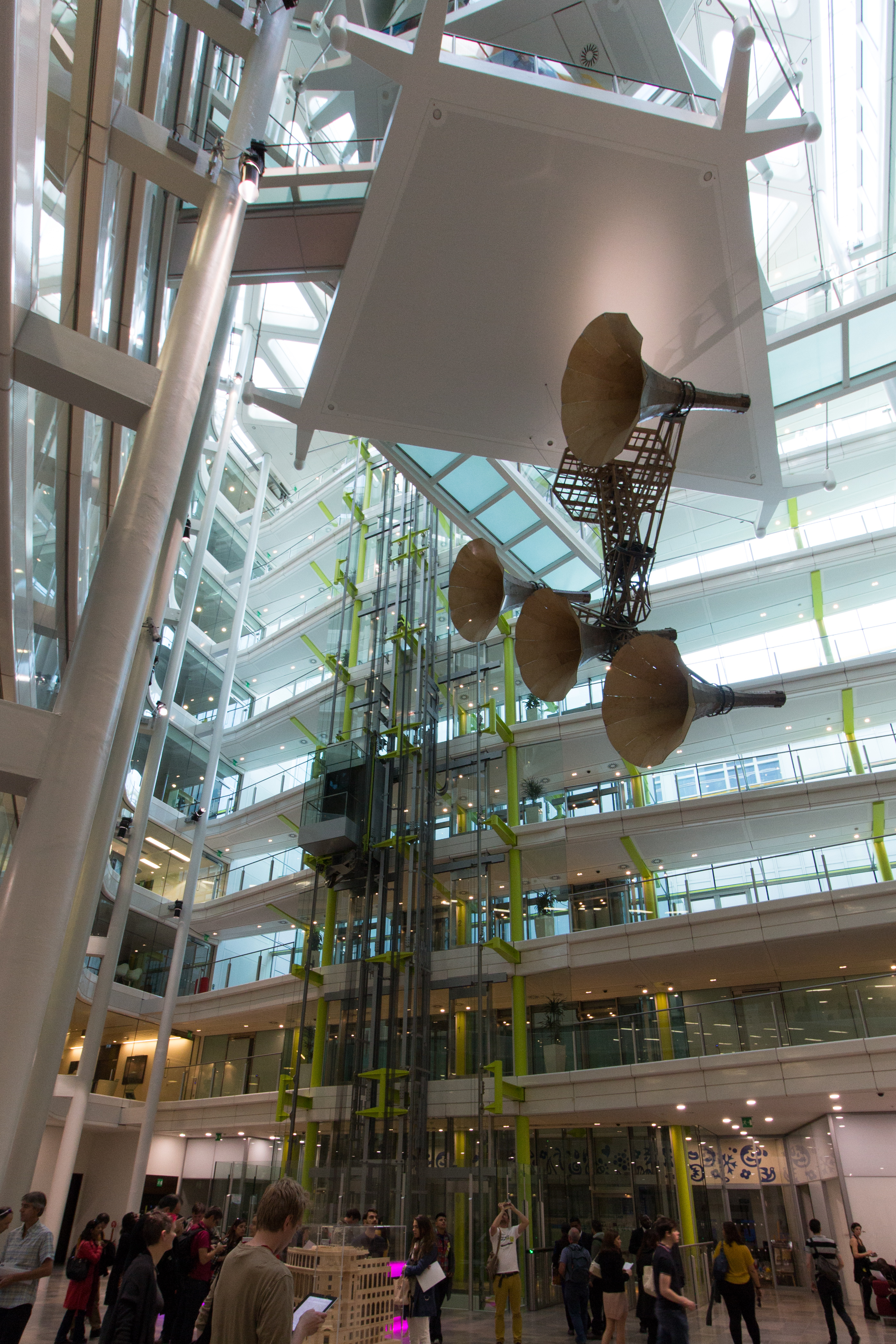
Interior of Unilever House. The sculpture is "The Space Trumpet" by Conrad Shawcross.

== Bibliography ==
- Aslet, Clive (1981). "Unilever House, Blackfriars". The Thirties Society Journal. 1: 18–21.
