= Williams v Commonwealth (No 2) =

2014 Australian constitutional law case

- Court: High Court of Australia
- Full case name: Williams v Commonwealth of Australia
- Decided: 19 June 2014
- Citations: [2014] HCA 23; 252 CLR 416

Case history
- Prior actions: Williams v Commonwealth of Australia [2012] HCA 23; 248 CLR 156

Court membership
- Judges sitting: French CJ, Hayne, Crennan, Kiefel, Bell and Keane JJ

Williams v Commonwealth of Australia [2014] HCA 23 (also known as Williams (No 2)) is a judgment of the High Court. It is related to executive prerogative and spending in relation to the Australian Government's National School Chaplaincy Programme.

== Background ==
Following the decision in Williams v Commonwealth (Williams (No 1)), the Commonwealth enacted the Financial Framework Legislation Amendment Act (No 3) in an attempt to validate the National School Chaplaincy Programme and other similar Commonwealth spending programs.

Mr Williams brought new proceedings in the High Court challenging the validity of the legislation's provisions and regulations, in particular, s 32B of the Financial Management and Accountability Act 1997 (Cth) (FMA Act), Part 5AA and Schedule 1AA of the Financial Management and Accountability Regulations 1997 (FMA Regulations) and item 9 of Schedule 1 to the Financial Framework Legislation Amendment Act (No 3) 2012 (the Financial Framework Amendment Act).

== Judgment ==
The High Court unanimously upheld Mr Williams's challenge that the relevant provisions of the Financial Framework Legislation Amendment Act were invalid as they extended beyond the scope of Parliament's power under the Constitution.

The High Court rejected arguments by the Commonwealth that the provisions were valid as laws incidental to the powers to spend and to enter into contracts, finding that the laws needed to be grounded in a separate head of legislative power.
