= IPCom =

IP licensing and technology R&D company

IPCom GmbH & Co. KG
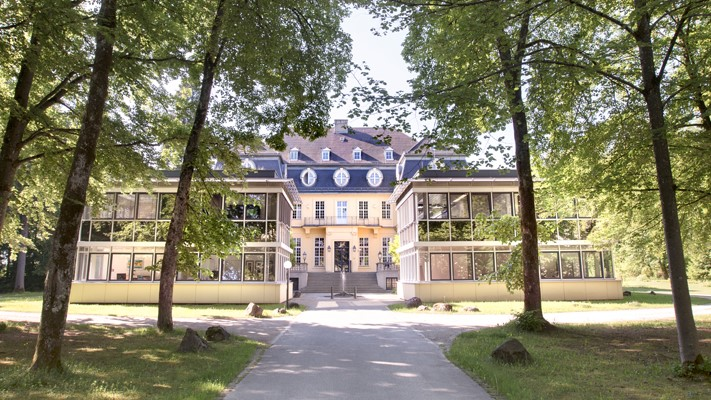
- IPCom office in Pullach
- Type: GmbH & Co. KG
- Industry: Telecommunications, intellectual property licensing
- Founded: 2007
- Headquarters: Zugspitzstr. 15, 82049 Pullach, Germany
- Key people: Pio Suh, Martin Hans, Edward Tomlinson
- Number of employees: 12
- Website: www.ipcom-munich.com

IPCom GmbH & Co. KG is a German intellectual property rights licensing and technology R&D company.

== History and business model ==
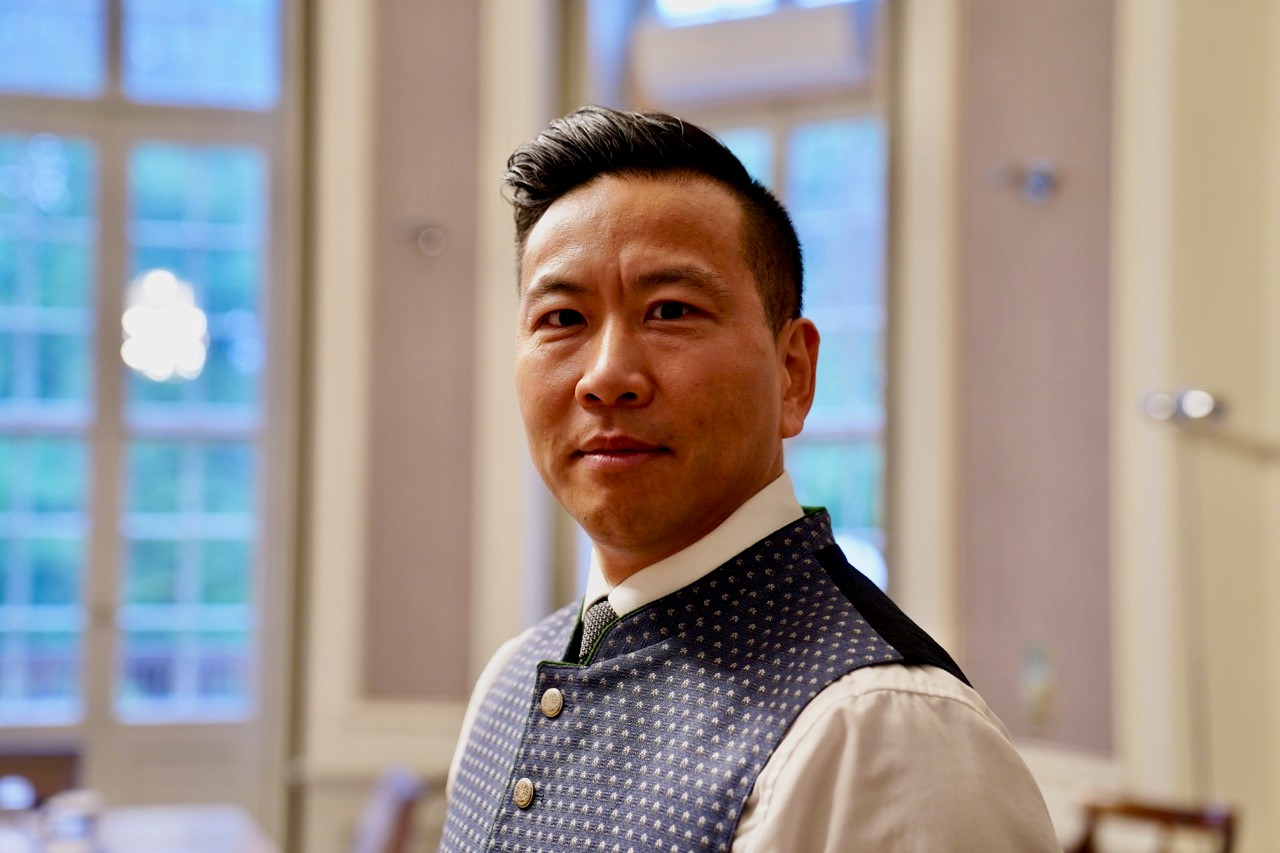
Pio Suh, IPCom's Managing Director

The company was founded in 2007 by German patent lawyers Bernhard Frohwitter and Christoph Schoeller in Munich, Germany. Shortly after, the name was changed to IPCom Beteiligungs GmbH and its headquarters moved to nearby Pullach. The present IPCom GmbH & Co. KG was founded in 2009 as Profi-Start Beteiligungs GmbH and changed its name to its current name in 2011. In July 2018 Pio Suh, a German attorney, was appointed as the new Managing Director of IPCom. At the same time, Frohwitter and Schoeller resigned as shareholders of the company. Under Suh's tenure IPCom settled long-lasting disputes with various smartphone manufacturers as well as with network providers.

IPCom acquires and monetizes intellectual property rights, especially patents in the mobile communication sector. 35 of which are considered standard essential patents (SEP). The company licences patents according to FRAND standards. In the time of its existence, IPCom has filed numerous law suits for patent infringements (see section on law suits). In 2014, the company established its own R&D department. Through ongoing R&D activity, IPCom has also developed its own global 5G patent portfolio, with numerous applications currently pending. In 2018, IPCom expanded its business activities with a new consulting service that assists companies in developing and monetizing patents.

== Law suits ==
In 2007, IPCom acquired a portfolio of mobile technology patents from Robert Bosch GmbH, with the financial help of Fortress Investment Group. This comprised more than 160 patent families in 2G, 2.5G, 3G and LTE technologies, 30 of which are SEPs covering the USA, Europe and Asia. Technologies covered in the portfolio span areas including interface, MMS and digital rights management, applications, synchronization and packet data transmission. One of the central patents is from the 100 family, called 100A (EP 1 841 268). 100A relates to controlling how UMTS mobile phones gain initial access to a network. Since 2007, IPCom has sued several communications companies over infringements of this 100A patent, and other patent families.

Backed by Fortress, IPCom sued Nokia for patent infringement of 8 patent families for € 12 billion ($18 billion at the time) in 2008. The lawsuit was later settled under undisclosed conditions. Also in 2008, IPCom filed a lawsuit against HTC. The conflict dragged until 2022, when the opponents finally reached an agreement. The legal conflict encompassed several lawsuits in Germany, the United Kingdom and at the European Patent Office. IPCom eventually sued retailer MediaSaturn for selling HTC phones. Other lawsuits were filed against Deutsche Telekom, which were settled in 2013, when Deutsche Telekom paid "several 100 million euros" to IPCom. Another case that received media coverage was IPCom's unsuccessful lawsuit against Apple over € 1.6 billion in Germany. IPCom filed a patent infringement lawsuit at the District Court of Fuzhou, China putting Apple under great pressure due to its exposure in China where supposedly all of its smartphones have been manufactured. Finally, IPCom secured a settlement with Apple, allegedly with an "eight-digit sum" in 2022. Other lawsuits concerned Vodafone, Lenovo, and Xiaomi.

Some of the patents have been invalidated by the courts, including the German Federal Patent Court. The 100A patent however was ultimately upheld by the Federal Patent Court in October 2019, dismissing a nullity action brought by Apple and HTC.

== Controversy ==
IPCom's litigation practice evoked widespread criticism. Before 2007, "patent trolls" were a mostly north American phenomenon. With their lawsuit against Nokia, demanding an unprecedented 12 billion euros, IPCom was seen the first European patent troll. In the subsequent lawsuits, the company was repeatedly called a patent troll. IPCom has always rejected these accusations. According to Germany-based legal magazine JUVE-Patent, IPCom founder Frohwitter made tactical mistakes during the first Nokia-trials, which made IPCom look too greedy and contributed to the company's bad reputation. JUVE-Patent editor Mathieu Klos believes that "IPCom has long since shed its dubious reputation as a patent troll".
