= A. H. F. Lefroy =

Canadian legal scholar (1852–1919)

Augustus Henry Frazer Lefroy (21 June 1852 – 7 March 1919) was a Canadian legal scholar.

Augustus Henry Frazer Lefroy was born on 21 June 1852 in Toronto, then in Canada West. He attended Rugby School and New College, Oxford, receiving an honours BA in 1875 and a MA in 1880.

Lefroy was called to the bars of England and Ontario in 1877 and 1878, respectively. He became a professor of law at the University of Toronto in 1900. He wrote four texts on Canadian constitutional law, published between 1897 and 1920. Lefroy was a legal positivist who endorsed the views of John Austin.

He died on 7 March 1919 in Ottawa.

== Books ==
- The Law of Legislative Power in Canada (1897/1898)
- Canada's Federal System (1913)
- Leading Cases in Canadian Constitutional Law (1914)
- A Short Treatise on Canadian Constitutional Law (1918)

== Sources ==
- Risk, R. C. B. (1991). "A. H. F. Lefroy: Common Law Thought in Late Nineteenth-Century Canada: On Burying One's Grandfather". University of Toronto Law Journal. 41 (3): 307–331. doi:10.2307/825838. JSTOR 825838.
