= De Keyser's Royal Hotel =

Former hotel in Blackfriars, London

Coordinates: 51°30′42.46″N 0°6′20.73″W

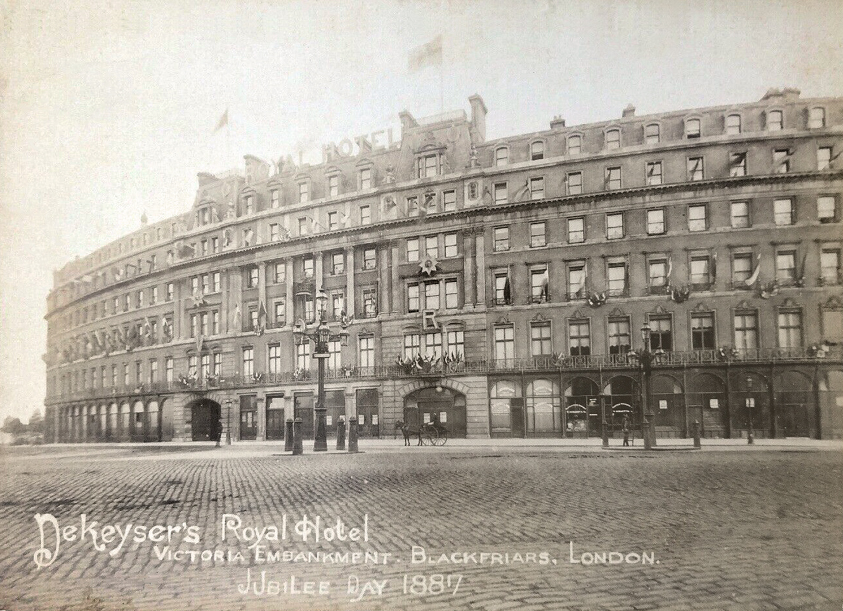
De Keyser's Royal Hotel, London 1887

De Keyser's Royal Hotel was a large hotel on the Victoria Embankment, at its junction with New Bridge Street (now the A201), Blackfriars, London. The location was formerly the site of Bridewell Palace.

== Founding ==
The Royal Hotel was founded before 1845 by Constant de Keyser, an immigrant to England from Belgium. It was a high-end hotel, catering mainly to visitors from continental Europe. His son Polydore de Keyser ran the hotel from around 1856.

== New building and expansion ==
A new hotel building with five storeys and two basements was opened at the same site on 5 September 1874, designed by the English architect Edward Augustus Gruning. The foundation stone was laid by the daughter of the Belgian Vice-Counsul. The new building had a long curved façade facing the River Thames, close to Sion College and near the site of the new City of London School building that opened in 1883. The exterior was in an Anglicised form of the Second Empire Style, faced by white Suffolk bricks and Portland stone, with a Mansard roof covered with green slates and hips, ridges and dormers in zinc. An archway led to an internal courtyard, at the centre of which was a glass dome covering a billiard room below, later used as a lounge. The interior was decorated in opulent French style, with 230 guest rooms and many function rooms, including a dining hall 110 by 40 feet (34 m × 12 m) with space for 400 people. Furniture was imported from Paris.

A second wing opened in 1882, when the hotel became the largest in London, accommodating up to 480 guests, with a second dining room for another 250 people, and rooms for 150 staff.

Sir Polydore de Keyser had no children. His hotel was sold to a limited company in 1897, and a nephew Polydor Welchand de Keyser took over the management.

== Decline and closure ==
Following the outbreak of the First World War, the hotel suffered serious decline. Anti-German sentiment had increased across Britain and the internment of German nationals and German-British citizens during the conflict had led to the arrest and confinement of many of the hotel's German staff, including its manager. It was eventually taken over by a receiver. With a shortage of office space in London for the wartime ministries, the hotel was requisitioned in May 1916 by the Office of Works for the wartime use of the Royal Flying Corps. Renamed "Adastral House", the first building to bear that name, it was the London headquarters of the Royal Flying Corps until it moved to Hotel Cecil on the formation of the new Air Ministry and the Royal Air Force in 1918. For a short period it was occupied by the Royal Army Medical Corps, until 1919.

The owner of the hotel claimed compensation, leading to a legal case on the power of the royal prerogative, Attorney-General v De Keyser's Royal Hotel Limited. The case reached the House of Lords, which held that the Defence of the Realm Act 1914 replaced the royal prerogative, and that compensation was due under the Defence Act 1842.

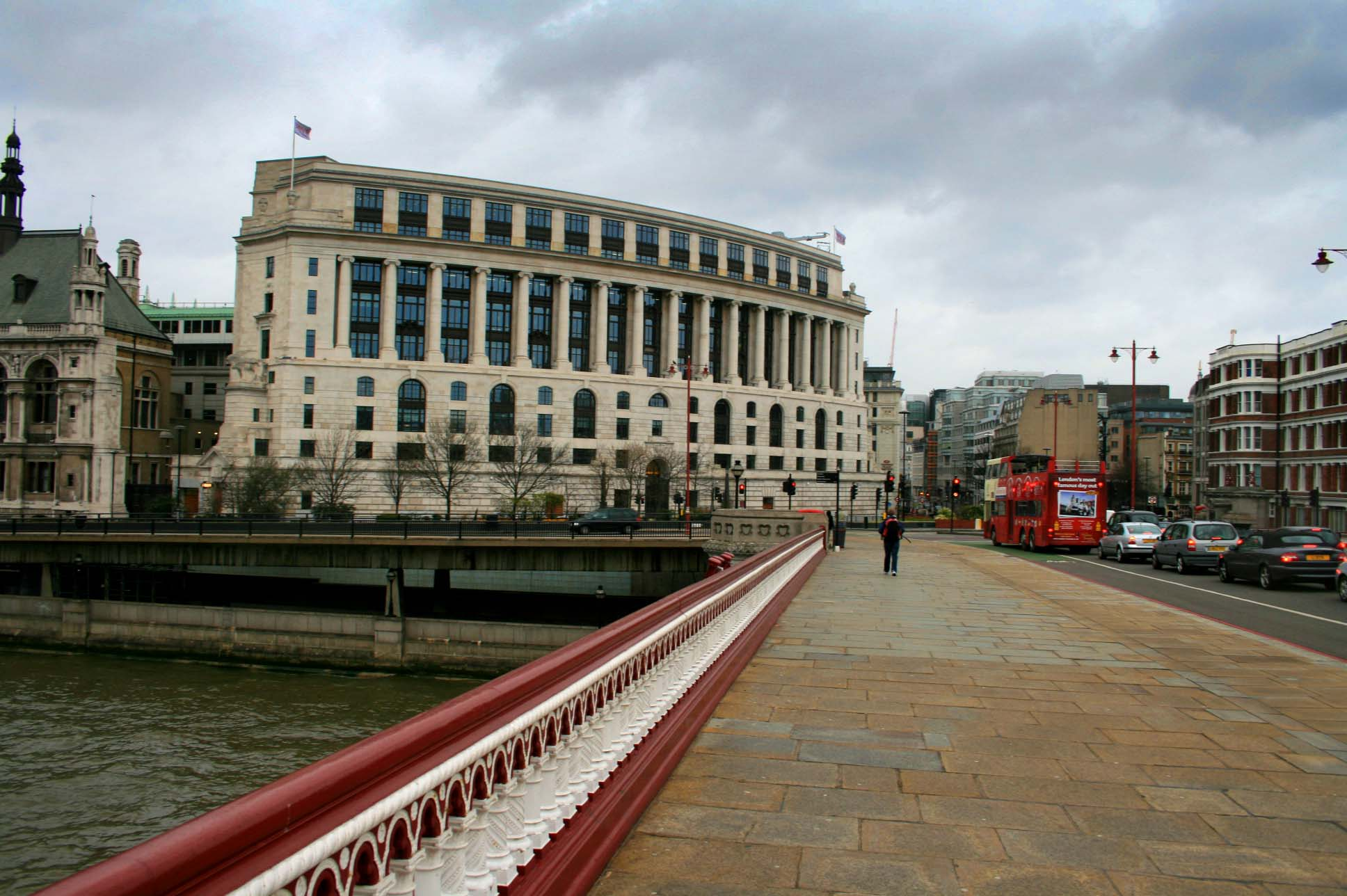
Unilever House, built on the site of De Keyser's

The hotel never reopened. The building was sold to Lever Brothers in 1921, and it became their London headquarters. The hotel building was demolished in 1931 to make way for the construction of Unilever House.
