= The Bridewell =

Scottish prison

Coordinates: 55°57′11″N 3°10′59″W

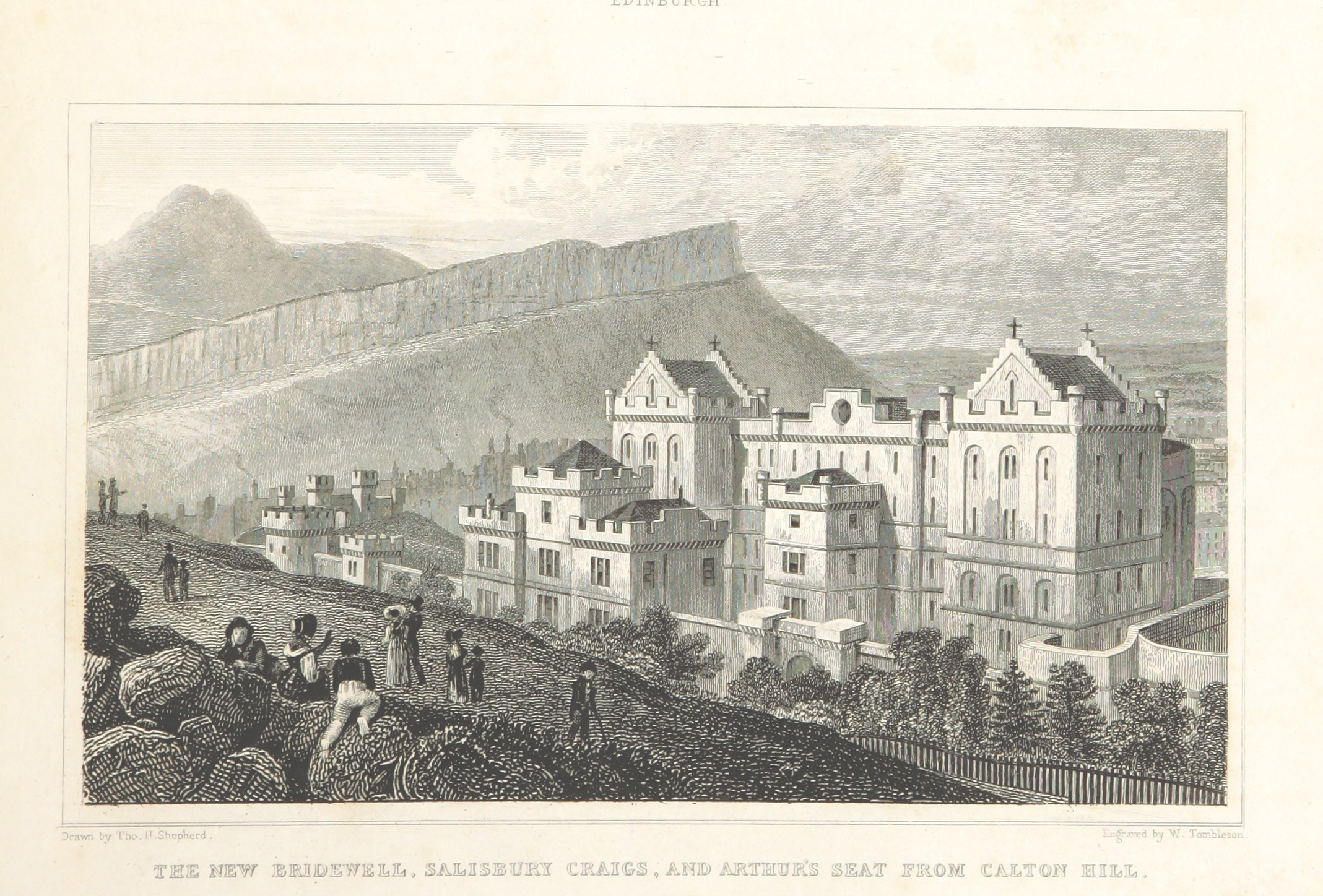
The new Bridewell, Salisbury Crags, and Arthur's Seat from Calton Hill

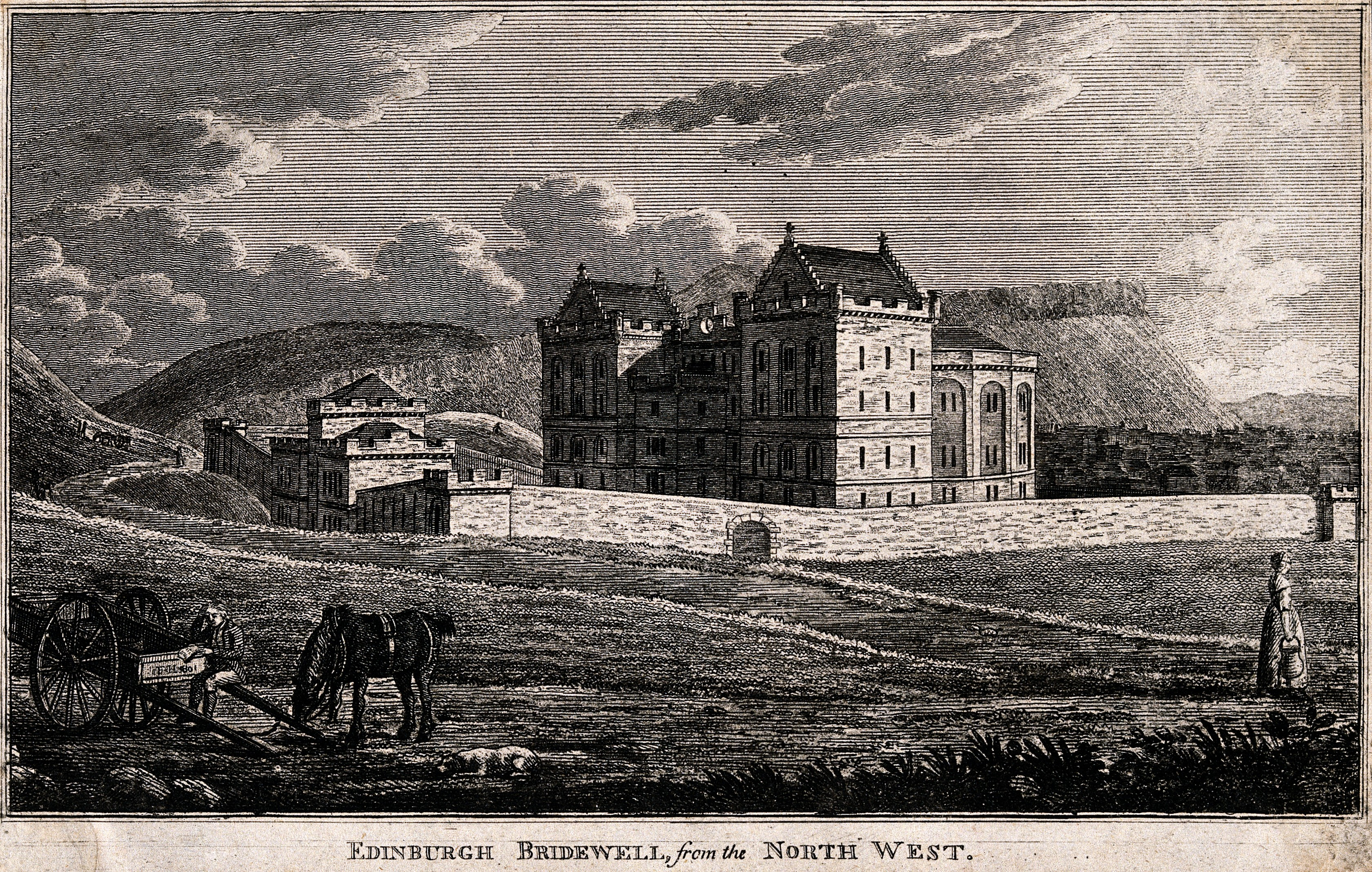
The Bridewell Prison

The Bridewell was a prison in Edinburgh, Scotland, built by Robert Adam in 1791.

The remains of the prison can still be seen built into the bottom part of the Scottish Government building on Regent Road.
