= National Student Wellbeing Program =

Australian federal government programme

The National Student Wellbeing Program is an Australian federal government programme which funds religious chaplains and non religious "student wellbeing officers" in Australian primary and secondary schools. They are to provide pastoral care in order to support student wellbeing. Practitioners are not allowed to "provide religious instruction or religious counselling" or "proselytise" and must follow the rules and qualification requirements of the NSWP.

The program was formerly called the National School Chaplaincy Programme, and was set up in 2006 by the Howard government. From 2014 to 2023, there was no option for a non religious counsellor, with all chaplains requiring to be "ordained, commissioned or endorsed by a recognised religious institution".

In 2023, schools regained the ability to use a non religious counsellor, and the name of the program was changed to the National Student Wellbeing Program.

The grants are $20,280 a year for schools and $24,336 for schools in remote areas.

== History ==
In October 2006, the Howard government established NSCP, at an expected cost of $90 million, to provide $20,000 grants for schools to employ chaplains. In Australia, chaplains in state schools have, controversially, been funded by the federal government since 2007, as well as local communities. Chaplaincy services are provided by religious service companies which are predominantly Christian, though non-denominational within Christianity, including Scripture Union Queensland, Genr8 Ministries in NSW and Access Ministries. As of 2008, there were 2,850 chaplains employed under NSCP.

On 7 September 2011, Peter Garrett, Education Minister in the Gillard government, announced a number of changes in NSCP. New chaplains were to be required to have a "Certificate IV in Youth Work, Pastoral Care or an equivalent qualification", while previously no formal qualifications were required. The changes also offered schools the option to employ, instead of "a religious support worker" (chaplain), a "secular student well-being officer", following concerns over the appropriateness of having a religious worker in a public school. Previously schools were only able to hire a secular welfare worker under the programme if they could demonstrate that their efforts to find an ordained chaplain had failed. On 27 September 2013 there were 2,339 chaplains and 512 student welfare workers employed under NSCP.

In May 2014, the Abbott government removed the provision to fund secular student well-being officers, meaning all chaplains had to be affiliated with a religion. In the 2014 federal budget, the government increased the funds for NSCP to $243.8 million over a four-year period. Following the invalidation of NSCP by the High Court in June 2014, the Government redesigned NSCP, with funding now being delivered via states and territories rather than directly to schools. The new NSCP did not involve any other changes to policy. Agreements for the new NSCP were reached with all state and territory governments by 17 November 2014.

Following the 2022 Australian federal election, the new Albanese government commissioned a report on the program, following its decision to open up the program to non religious counsellors. Schools once again gained the ability to use a non religious counsellor in 2023, following the release of the report, and the name of the program was changed to the National Student Wellbeing Program. The report noted the community generally supported the work of the chaplains in schools, but that the religious aspect of the program was contentious, recommending the name change and ability to hire secular counsellors. The new program is to run from 2023 to 2027.

== High Court challenges ==
=== 2012 High Court challenge ===
In the High Court case of Williams v The Commonwealth of Australia & Ors [2012] HCA 23 (also known as the "School chaplains case") the executive prerogative and spending under section 61 of the Australian Constitution was challenged. The Court handed down its ruling in June 2012, that the Commonwealth's funding agreement for NSCP was invalid.

=== 2014 High Court challenge ===
A second High Court challenge, against the amended programme, was mounted by the 2012 litigant and was heard by the Court in May 2014. The High Court handed down its ruling on 19 June 2014. The focus of this case was whether the federal government has the power to fund the NSCP directly through local organisations. This second challenge also succeeded so that over $154 million in funding hitherto paid to a local organisation in Queensland became a debt.

However, the federal government responded by waiving that debt and making a commitment to circumvent the High Court ruling and continue with the budgeted $243 million spending on NSCP.

== Religious representation ==
While the NSCP is formally not religion-specific, the chaplains employed under the programme are disproportionately Christian. In 2011, one study stated that 96.5% of the chaplains employed under the programme were Christian, while only 64% of Australians identified as Christian (based on the 2006 census). By contrast, 0.01% of the chaplains were secular, whereas 19% of Australians identified as having no religion. Buddhism, the second largest religion, is followed by 2% of Australians, but only 0.03% of the school chaplains. Islam was followed by 1.7% of Australians, but only 0.9% of school chaplains. Judaism is the only major religion which had a roughly proportionate representation, with 0.45% of the Australian population following the religion, and 0.5% of school chaplains.

It was announced in May 2014 that the provision to allow secular welfare workers under NSCP would be removed, changing the definition of chaplain to someone ordained, commissioned or endorsed by a recognised religious institution. From December 2014, the 623 schools who were then hiring a secular welfare worker had to either hire a chaplain instead or go without either.

== Reception ==
NSCP has been controversial since it was announced by John Howard in 2006. The NSCP is most commonly opposed on the grounds that chaplains are under-qualified to deal with vulnerable young people, that it is not appropriate to have a religious worker in a public school, and that the money spent on the programme is better needed elsewhere, such as to help children with disabilities. A July 2011 report by the Commonwealth Ombudsman recommended changes in guidelines after it was found that some chaplains provided one-on-one counselling when not qualified to do so. Complaints have also been made that chaplains have used their position to recruit children to Christianity in breach of government guidelines. The number of complaints specifically regarding proselytising was 34 in 2011, 5 in 2012 and 1 in 2013. Complaints have also been made that chaplains have handed out literature stating homosexuality is wrong, that condoms promote promiscuity and are not effective for use as a contraceptive. Overall complaints about any aspect of the chaplaincy programme that were made to the relevant department was 93 in 2011, 51 in 2012 and 34 in 2013. Of the 85 between 2012 and 2013, 60% could not be substantiated. An online petition opposing the 2014 funding increase for the NSCP was signed by over 180,000 people.

In 2010 whilst she was Prime Minister, Julia Gillard voiced her support for the NSCP. In 2011 Peter Garrett publicly stated his support for the programme, though in a 2014 book review he stated "the line between chaplains acting to support students in the provision of general pastoral care and proselytising was too easily crossed". Other politicians supporting the programme include former Senator Eric Abetz.

The Australian Psychological Society has repeatedly criticised the NSCP. The director of the Black Dog Institute has expressed concern at the funding of chaplaincy over programmes backed by scientific evidence. Associate Professor Andrea Reupert, director of Monash University's mental health in schools project described a chaplain's comments to a student suffering from an eating disorder that she was "hungering for the word of the Lord" as inappropriate and appalling. The programme is also opposed by the Australian Education Union, and the New South Wales Teachers Federation.

Both the NSW Catholic Education Commission and the Anglican Education Commission do not have a position on chaplains in NSW government schools.

== See also ==
- Council for Christian Education in Schools
- Education in Australia
- Separation of church and state in Australia
- Section 116 of the Australian Constitution
