= Fielden =

- Pronunciation: English: /ˈfiːldən/
- Language: English

Origin
- Language: English
- Meaning: Person who lived amongst the fields
- Region of origin: England

Other names
- Variant forms: Fielder, Feilden

Fielden is an English surname. Notable people with it include:

- Charlotte Fielden (1932–2021), Canadian novelist, playwright, actress and therapist
- Edward Fielden (politician) (1857–1942), British businessman and Conservative Party politician
- Edward Fielden (RAF officer) (1903–1976), Royal Air Force pilot and World War II veteran
- Jamie Fielden (born 1978), English professional rugby league player
- Jay Fielden, magazine editor and writer
- John Fielden (1784–1849), British social reformer and benefactor
- Jonathan Fielden (born 1963), anaesthetics and intensive care consultant
- Joshua Fielden (politician) (1827–1887), British cotton manufacturer and Conservative politician
- Len Fielden (1903–1966), English footballer
- Louisa Fielden (born 1983), British film director, screenwriter and producer
- Olga Fielden (1903–1973), Belfast based playwright and novelist
- Samuel Fielden (1847–1922), socialist, anarchist and labor activist convicted in the 1886 Haymarket bombing
- Stuart Fielden (born 1979), English professional rugby league footballer
- Thomas Fielden (musician) (1883–1974), British pianist and music teacher
- Thomas Fielden (politician) (1854–1897), British Conservative Party politician
- TP Fielden, pen name of Christopher Wilson (born 1947) for novels

== See also ==
- Fielden, Missouri, United States, an unincorporated community
- Fielden Chair of Pure Mathematics, endowed professorial position in the School of Mathematics, University of Manchester, England
- Fielden Electronics, a UK former company
