= Stephen Edwardes =

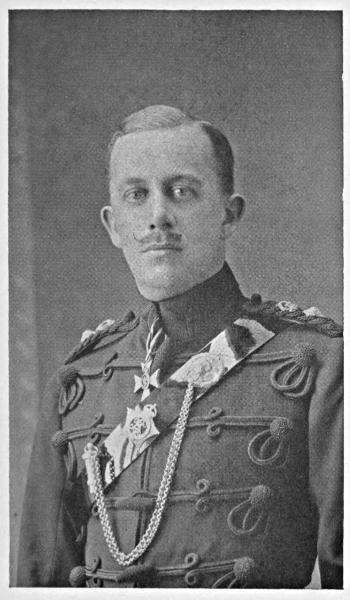

Stephen Meredyth Edwardes (1873–1927) was an English colonial administrator of the Indian Civil Service. He is known as the first civilian Bombay Police Commissioner, and as an author on Indian topics.

== Early life ==
He was the son of the Rev. Stephen Edwardes, a Fellow of Merton College, Oxford, who died in 1886; his mother was Ellen Edwardes, daughter of David Edwardes FRCS, who married secondly in 1895, Thomas Erskine Holland. His paternal grandfather Lewis Edwardes was a schoolmaster with an academy near Streatham Common, described by his pupil John Beames as "a short, stout kindly old Welshman."

Stephen Edwardes the younger was educated at Eton College from 1885 to 1888, where the librarian Henry Broadbent was his tutor. His younger brother Lewis (born 1874) was educated at Charterhouse School, leaving in 1890 and becoming a stockbroker.

Stephen Edwardes studied at Christ Church, Oxford; but may not have been an undergraduate, since his name is absent from Foster's matriculation list covering 1880 to 1892. In 1894 Edwardes entered by examination the Indian Civil Service, one of two candidates awarded an Indian Civil Service scholarship at Christ Church, the other being Loftus Otway Clarke B.A., but Edwardes was named without postnominals.

In 1895 Edwardes was a 2nd Assistant in Bombay. To the 1901 census in British India, he contributed Part IV History of Volume X Bombay (Town & Island). He held posts as district collector, magistrate and secretary in the administration.

== Police Commissioner 1909–1916 ==
As Police Commissioner Edwardes was a noted reformer, regulating prostitution and controlling disturbances arising from ethnic and religious tensions. He regarded the activism of Bal Gangadhar Tilak, a Chitpavan Brahmin, as consciously employing offence to Muslims. He took steps to establish a charitable home for Muslim girls.

A detailed autobiographical account of this period is in Chapter IX of Edwardes's The Bombay City Police. He succeeded Herbert George Gell, a career police officer. In 1908 he had been on a small committee under William Thomson Morison, appointed by Bombay Governor Sir George Clarke, considering Bombay's policing. After the Morison committee's report was submitted, he took leave, returning to the United Kingdom. Informed of his appointment as Police Commissioner for Bombay, he met Sir Edward Henry, Police Commissioner of London, and spent some time studying police methods before sailing for India. He took up the post on 7 May 1909.

Frank Arthur Money Vincent, a career police officer, acted under Edwardes as Deputy Commissioner, CID, from 1909, and succeeded him. While Edwardes was in post, the Chief Presidency Magistrate was Arthur Aston; Alison Edwardes, Stephen's daughter, had acted as bridesmaid at Aston's wedding in 1906.

The festival of Muharram, and clashes between Sunni and Shia Muslims at it, had historically been a source of public disorder in Bombay. There was serious trouble in 1911. Vincent was out on the streets on the final day. Finally garrison troops — the Warwickshire Regiment under Brigadier John Swann — fired on the crowd, after Edwardes had requested the use of force through a Presidency magistrate. Edwardes then took steps to regulate Muharram processions. He worked with Muslim leaders to protect the peace. Measures remained in place to 1922. Among those actively cooperating with the police, and mentioned in Edwardes's account, was the Sunni merchant Sulliman Cassim Mitha.

== Later life ==
In 1916 Edwardes was made Municipal Commissioner of Bombay, but bad health meant he stepped down shortly from the post. He retired in 1918. In 1921 he was recorded as living at Sandilands, West Byfleet in England.

Edwardes had a London post as Secretary to the Indo-British Association, a pressure group set up by George Clarke, 1st Baron Sydenham of Combe. He took over as Secretary of the Royal Asiatic Society from Ella Sykes in 1926. He died on 1 January 1927 at Fielden from bronchial pneumonia.

== Works ==
- Monograph upon the silk fabrics of the Bombay Presidency (1900)
- The Rise of Bombay—a Retrospect, (1902)
- The Ruling Princes of India—a historical and statistical Account of Junagadh and Bhavnagar (1906)
- The Gazetteer of Bombay City and Island (1909)
- By-ways of Bombay (1912)
- Memoir of Rao Bahadur Ranchhodlal Chhotalal, C.I.E. (1920) on Ranchhodlal Chhotalal.
- The Bombay City Police: A Historical Sketch, 1672–1916 (1923)
- Kharshedji Rustamji Cama, 1831–1909: A Memoir (1923) on the Parsi reformer Kharshedji Rustomji Cama.
- Memoir of Sir Dinshaw Manockjee Petit, First Baronet (1823–1901) (1923) on Dinshaw Maneckji Petit.
- Crime in India (1924)
- Babur, Diarist and Despot (1926)
- Mughal Rule in India (1930) with Herbert Leonard Offley Garrett

His revision of A History of the Mahrattas by James Grant Duff appeared in 1921. He edited the second edition in 1923 of Vincent Arthur Smith's Oxford History of India, and the 1928 fourth edition of Smith's Early History of India, acknowledging help from R. D. Banerji, K. P. Jayaswal and D. R. Bhandarkar.

From 1923, Edwardes edited The Indian Antiquary with Richard Carnac Temple and S. Krishnaswami Aiyangar.

== Awards and honours ==
Edwardes was made Commander of the Royal Victorian Order in 1912, and Companion of the Order of the Star of India in 1915.

== Family ==
Edwardes married in 1895 Celia Darker, daughter of Arthur Darker of Nottingham (called Charles in the Eton Register). The couple had two sons and a daughter.
