= Ben Bradshaw =

British politician (born 1960)

The Right Honourable Sir Ben Bradshaw
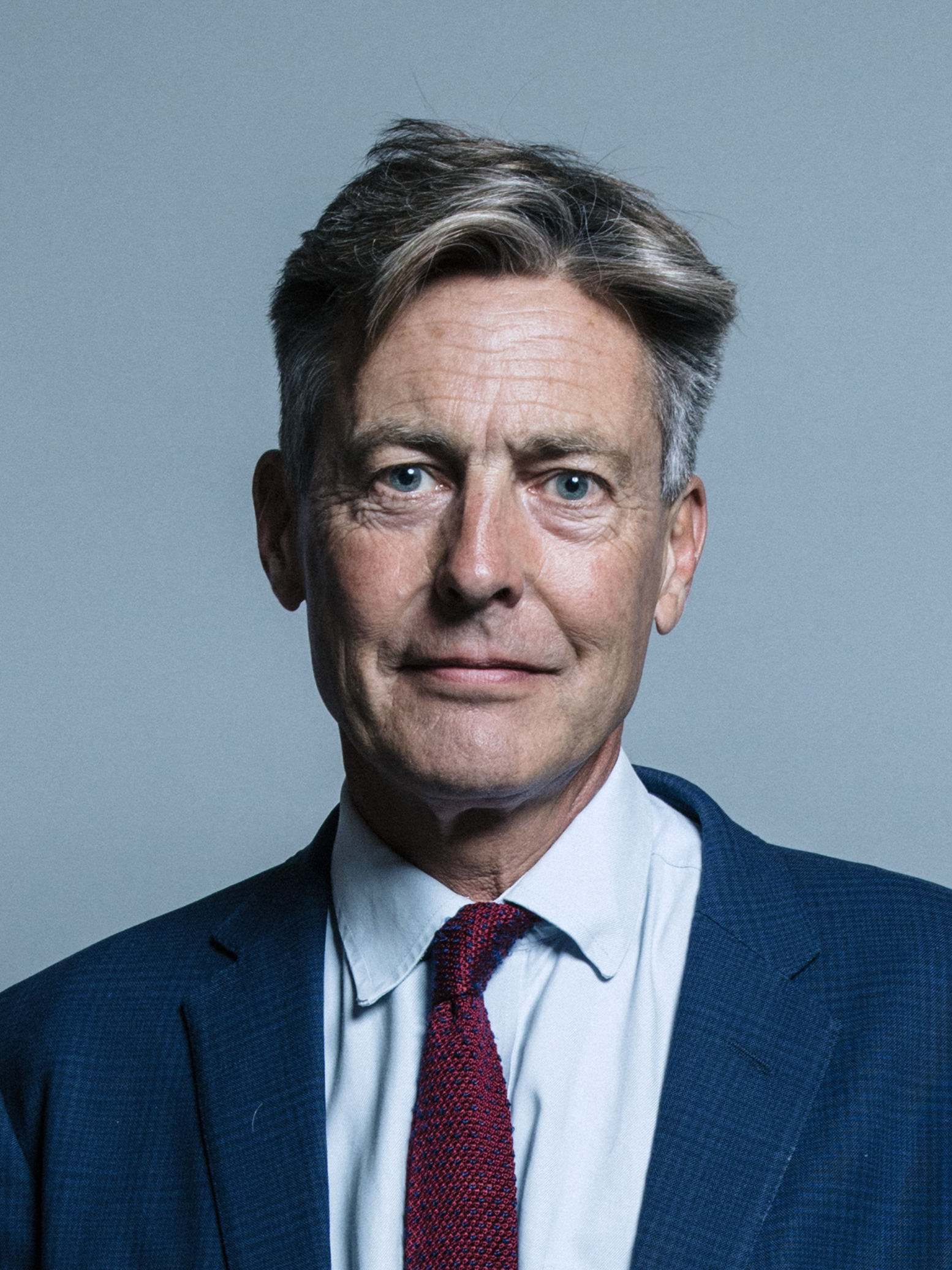
- Official portrait, 2017

Shadow Secretary of State for Culture, Media and Sport
- In office 11 May 2010 – 8 October 2010
- Leader: Harriet Harman (Acting); Ed Miliband
- Preceded by: Jeremy Hunt
- Succeeded by: Ivan Lewis

Secretary of State for Culture, Media and Sport
- In office 5 June 2009 – 11 May 2010
- Prime Minister: Gordon Brown
- Preceded by: Andy Burnham
- Succeeded by: Jeremy Hunt

Minister of State for Health
- In office 28 June 2007 – 5 June 2009
- Prime Minister: Gordon Brown
- Preceded by: Andy Burnham
- Succeeded by: Mike O'Brien

Minister for the South West
- In office 28 June 2007 – 5 June 2009
- Prime Minister: Gordon Brown
- Preceded by: Position established
- Succeeded by: Jim Knight

Minister of State for Local Environment, Marine and Animal Welfare
- In office 13 June 2003 – 28 June 2007
- Prime Minister: Tony Blair
- Preceded by: Elliot Morley
- Succeeded by: Position abolished

Deputy Leader of the House of Commons
- In office 29 May 2002 – 13 June 2003
- Prime Minister: Tony Blair
- Preceded by: Stephen Twigg
- Succeeded by: Phil Woolas

Parliamentary Under-Secretary of State for Foreign and Commonwealth Affairs
- In office 12 June 2001 – 29 May 2002
- Prime Minister: Tony Blair
- Preceded by: The Baroness Scotland of Asthal
- Succeeded by: Mike O'Brien

Member of Parliament for Exeter
- In office 1 May 1997 – 30 May 2024
- Preceded by: John Hannam
- Succeeded by: Steve Race

Personal details
- Born: Benjamin Peter James Bradshaw; 30 August 1960 (age 66) London, England
- Party: Labour
- Spouse: Neal Dalgleish
- Education: University of Sussex
- Website: Official website parliament..ben-bradshaw

Sir Benjamin Peter James Bradshaw (born 30 August 1960) is a British politician who served as Secretary of State for Culture, Media and Sport from 2009 to 2010. A member of the Labour Party, he served as the Member of Parliament (MP) for Exeter from 1997 to 2024. Before entering politics he worked as a BBC Radio reporter.

== Early life and career in journalism ==
Bradshaw is the son of an Anglican priest and former canon of Norwich Cathedral, Peter Bradshaw, and his wife Daphne Murphy. Bradshaw was educated at Thorpe Grammar School, followed by the University of Sussex where he read for a degree in German. He also attended the University of Freiburg in Germany while an undergraduate. Between 1982 and 1983, Bradshaw taught English at the Technikum, a school of technology in Winterthur in the Zurich canton of Switzerland.

Bradshaw became a reporter with the Exeter Express & Echo in 1984 and subsequently joined the Eastern Daily Press in Norwich as a reporter in 1985. In 1986 he joined the staff of BBC Radio Devon and became the Berlin correspondent for BBC Radio in 1989 and was working in the city when the Berlin Wall fell. In 1991, he became a reporter with BBC Radio's The World at One, contributing to the programme until his election to Westminster. He won the Sony News Reporter Award in 1993.

== Parliamentary career ==
=== Election and first term as an MP ===
Bradshaw was selected to contest the marginal parliamentary seat of Exeter at the 1997 general election after the first choice candidate was deselected by the local Labour party on instructions from Labour party headquarters.

The sitting Conservative MP, John Hannam, had retired and the Conservatives chose Adrian Rogers to be their candidate. While Bradshaw is openly gay, Rogers is a leading member of the religious right. During the campaign there were allegations of homophobia and sin. The result, however, was not close, and Bradshaw was elected as the Labour MP for Exeter with a majority of 11,705. He made his maiden speech in the House of Commons on 4 July 1997. He was the second British MP who was openly gay at the time of first election, 21 minutes after Stephen Twigg.

In the Commons, Bradshaw introduced the Pesticides Act in 1998, which gave more powers to inspectors. He became a Parliamentary Private Secretary to the Minister of State at the Department of Health John Denham in 2000.

=== Initial ministerial posts ===
Following the 2001 general election Bradshaw entered Tony Blair's government as the Parliamentary Under Secretary of State at the Foreign and Commonwealth Office. Only days after being appointed to the Foreign Office, he had to answer questions following the terrorist attacks of 11 September 2001. On 6 March 2002, while answering Parliamentary Questions, Bradshaw accused George Galloway of "being not just an apologist but a mouthpiece for the Iraqi regime over many years". Galloway responded by accusing Bradshaw of being a liar, though after a suspension of the Commons sitting, both men withdrew their comments.

Bradshaw became the Deputy to the Leader of the House of Commons Robin Cook in 2002, and was an Under Secretary of State at the Department of Environment, Food and Rural Affairs from 2003 until 2006, when he was made a Minister of State at the same department. During this period, he was sent to Brussels to negotiate changes to the Common Fisheries Policy on behalf of the British in-shore fishing fleet.

In 2003, Bradshaw supported the government's stance on Iraq and voted for the 2003 invasion of Iraq.

In 2005, Bradshaw supported the detention of terror suspects without trial and voted for the Prevention of Terrorism Act 2005.

=== Health minister ===
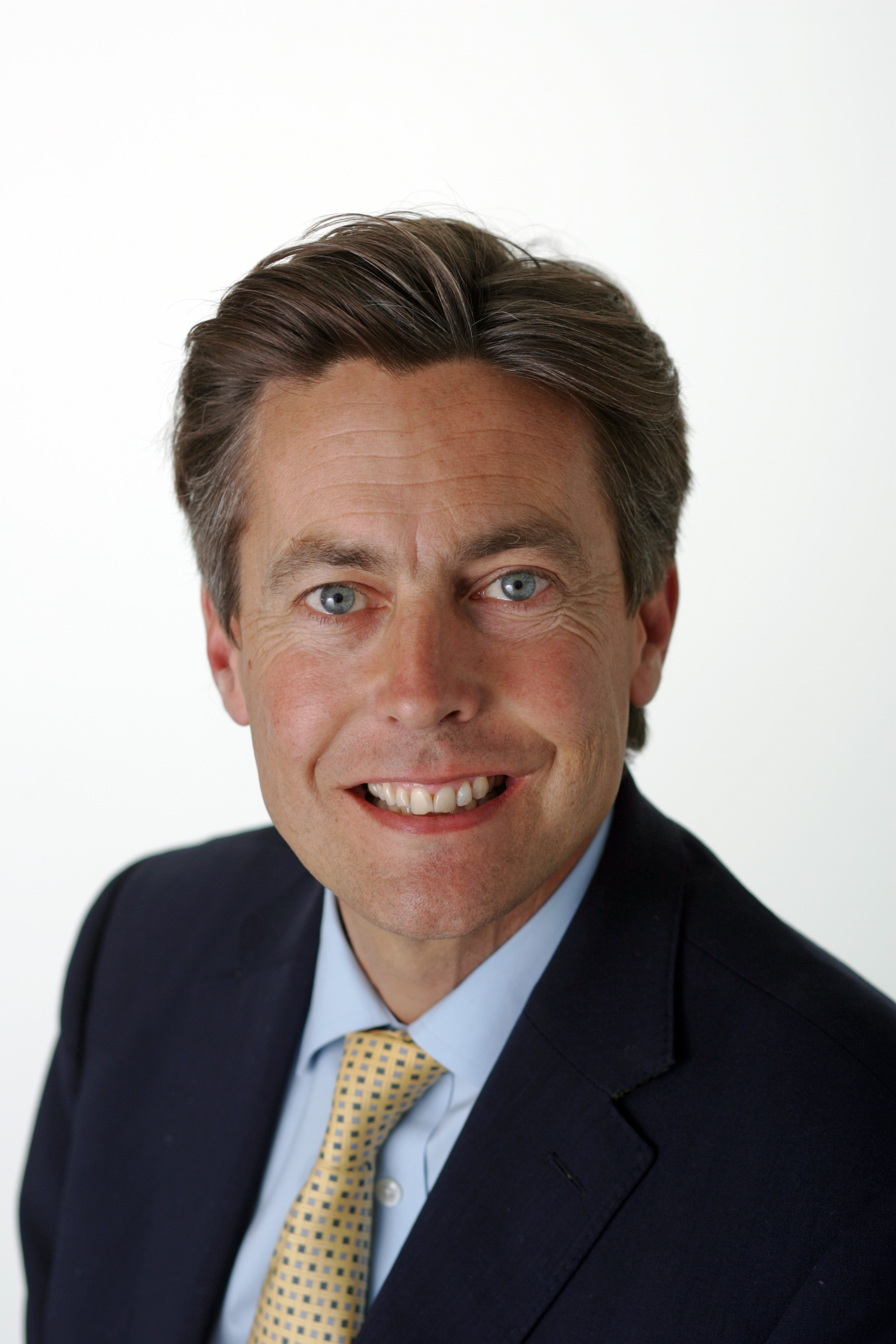
Official photograph of Bradshaw when Minister of State in the Department of Health

On 28 June 2007, he was moved to become a Minister of State in the Department of Health and, in addition, was given the Minister for the South West portfolio.

Bradshaw was the subject of controversy while Minister for Health. His responses to questioning on Radio 4 about the shortfall in NHS dentistry leading to patients being unable to access NHS dentists and even resorting to treating themselves was to claim that those needing urgent treatment should go to see their GP, which prompted the British Medical Association to observe that a general practitioner was no substitute for a qualified dentist.

Bradshaw also claimed that GPs were operating "gentlemen's agreements" to ensure patients didn't move between surgeries, claims dismissed as "absolute nonsense" by doctors' leaders.

On the subject of the National Programme for IT, a scheme dogged by cost overruns, delays, and doubts over its benefit to patients, he commented: "Our use of computer technology in the NHS is becoming the envy of the world. It is saving lives, saving time and saving money. If you talk to health and IT experts anywhere in the world they point to Britain as example of computer technology being used successfully to improve health services to the public."

He was also criticised for defending car parking fees at NHS hospitals at a time when Wales was removing parking fees. The BMA called such charges "a tax on the sick", and questioned the legitimacy of trusts making up to £248,000 a month in parking fees. Bradshaw's claims that such charges were necessary to pay for patient care were dismissed by a shadow health spokesman, who commented that it did "not add up" for the government to make such claims in the light of an NHS surplus of £1.8bn.

His plan to introduce private management of some NHS trusts was also heavily criticised. The BMA called it a step towards privatising the NHS. Dr. Jonathan Fielden observed that there was no evidence private management was better than public sector management. Professor Allyson Pollock, head of the Centre for International Public Health Policy at the University of Edinburgh, said: "Bringing private management in will simply accelerate the process of privatisation of services which will have catastrophic effects for the patients and the public at large. It will mean less care for everyone, and more money for profits and shareholders". Nigel Edwards, of the NHS Confederation, said the government had tried drafting in private sector management before, at the Good Hope Hospital in Sutton Coldfield in 2003, which was not successful. He commented: "What it revealed is that the reason that hospitals tend to fail is often much more complicated and much more difficult than just poor management".

=== Expenses and period as Culture Secretary ===
It was claimed in May 2009 that he exploited the MPs' expenses system by claiming the entire interest bill on a property he shares with his partner in west London. Bradshaw has said claims made about his expenses were factually wrong.

On 5 June 2009 he was appointed Secretary of State for Culture, Media and Sport. He held this position until the 2010 general election and served as Shadow Culture Secretary until the 2010 Labour Party Shadow Cabinet election.

=== In opposition ===
On 7 October 2010 the Labour Party announced that he had failed to be elected to one of the 19 available places in the first Shadow cabinet of new leader Ed Miliband. In 2011, Bradshaw voted for the NATO-led military intervention in Libya. On 5 February 2013, he voted in favour in the House of Commons Second Reading vote on the Marriage (Same Sex Couples) Bill.

Following Labour's defeat in the 2015 general election, and the resignation of both Miliband and deputy leader Harriet Harman, Bradshaw announced his intention on 15 May to stand in the Labour Party deputy leadership election. He later gained the minimum 35 nominations required to stand in the ballot with the other candidates. Bradshaw came last in the election.

Bradshaw is a former critic of Jeremy Corbyn, whom he accused in a September 2016 article of being a "destructive combination of incompetence, deceit and menace". This comment was after Bradshaw was included on an internal Labour list of MPs, issued by mistake, who were implicated in "abusing" Corbyn and his supporters. He supported Owen Smith in the failed attempt to replace Jeremy Corbyn in the 2016 Labour leadership election. However, Bradshaw later changed his position on Jeremy Corbyn, praising his 2017 election performance.

In November 2016, Bradshaw opposed a motion in Parliament for the UK to withdraw support for the Saudi Arabian–led intervention in Yemen. George Galloway accused Bradshaw of supporting Saudi Arabia's regime where men like Bradshaw "are beheaded."

Bradshaw claimed during a Commons debate in December 2016 that it is "highly probable" that the result of the 2016 Brexit referendum was manipulated by Vladimir Putin. Bradshaw saw this as fitting a pattern of interfering in the business of other nations after the CIA accused Russian hackers of trying to influence US elections. Bradshaw also maintains that the Russians sent him an e-mail with sophisticated malware and maintains this was a cyberattack. Bradshaw said, "The email came to my gmail account, which is more vulnerable than my parliamentary one. What the sender was claiming was potentially extremely useful and political dynamite. It was drafted in a clever way to make it tempting to open." Bradshaw added, "I was the first MP to raise Russia's role in the Brexit vote in 2016. Ever since I have been asking questions about the Kremlin's subversion of our democracy."

On 3 February 2022, Bradshaw announced he would not be standing in the 2024 general election.

=== Other activities ===
In 2009, Bradshaw won the Stonewall Politician of the Year Award in 2009 for his work to support equality for lesbian, gay and bisexual people. He was given a score of 100% in favour of lesbian, gay and bisexual equality by Stonewall. He was sworn in as a member of the Privy Council in 2009, giving him the right to the honorific prefix "The Right Honourable".

== Personal life ==
On 24 June 2006, Bradshaw and his partner Neal Dalgleish, who is a BBC producer, registered a civil partnership. He was one of the first MPs to do so, and he was the first Cabinet Minister to be in a civil partnership. Bradshaw has asked the Church of England to clarify whether a member of the Church of England clergy who married a same sex partner would be disciplined or defrocked.

Bradshaw's brother is Jonathan Bradshaw, professor emeritus of social policy at the University of York.

Bradshaw was knighted in the 2023 Birthday Honours for political and public service.

== See also ==
- Russian interference in the 2016 Brexit referendum

Parliament of the United Kingdom
Preceded by John Hannam	Member of Parliament for Exeter; 1997–2024	Succeeded by Steve Race
Political offices
Preceded by Dawn Primarolo	Minister of State for Health; 2007–2009	Succeeded by Mike O'Brien
New office	Minister for the South West; 2007–2009	Succeeded by Jim Knight
Preceded by Andy Burnham	Secretary of State for Culture, Media and Sport; 2009–2010	Succeeded by Jeremy Hunt
Preceded by Jeremy Hunt	Shadow Secretary of State for Culture, Media and Sport; 2010	Succeeded by Ivan Lewis
