= Dan O'Herlihy =

Irish actor (1919–2005)

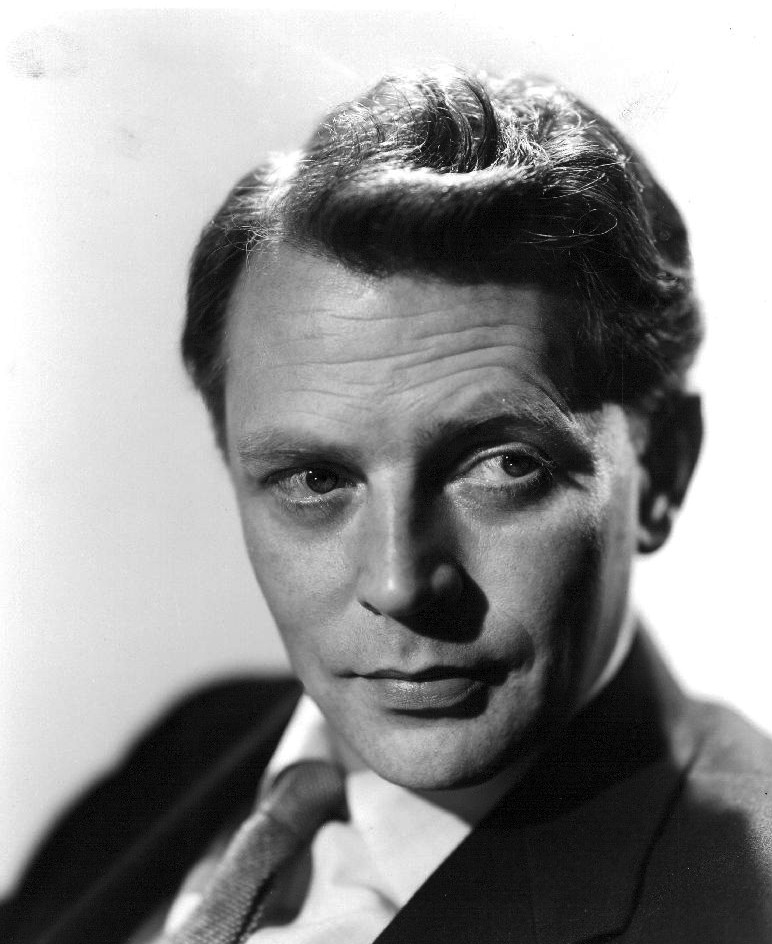
- O'Herlihy in 1955
- Born: Daniel Peter O'Herlihy; 1 May 1919; Wexford, County Wexford, Ireland
- Died: 17 February 2005 (aged 85); Malibu, California, U.S.
- Citizenship: Ireland; United States (after 1983)
- Education: C.B.C. Monkstown; University College Dublin
- Occupation: Actor
- Years active: 1944–1998
- Spouse: Elsie Bennett (m. 1945)
- Children: 5, including Gavan and Lorcan
- Relatives: Michael O'Herlihy (brother); Micaela O'Herlihy (granddaughter)

Daniel Peter O'Herlihy (Irish: Dónal Peadar Ó hIarlaithe; 1 May 1919 – 17 February 2005) was an Irish actor, who appeared in numerous American films and television series. His best-known roles included his Oscar-nominated portrayal of the title character in Luis Buñuel's Robinson Crusoe (1954), Brigadier General Warren A. Black in Fail Safe (1964), Marshal Ney in Waterloo (1970), Conal Cochran in Halloween III: Season of the Witch (1982), Grig in The Last Starfighter (1984), "The Old Man" in RoboCop (1987) and its 1990 sequel, and Andrew Packard on the second season of Twin Peaks (1991).

== Early life and education ==
O'Herlihy was born on 1 May 1919 in Wexford, County Wexford, but moved with his family to Dublin when he was young. He was educated at the Christian Brothers College in Dún Laoghaire (now C.B.C. Monkstown) and later studied at University College Dublin, graduating in 1944 with a degree in architecture, following in his father's footsteps.

He developed a keen interest in acting during his university studies. He joined several amateur theatre groups and joined the Abbey Theatre as a bit player. After graduating from the university, he decided to pursue acting full-time, working at the Abbey and Gate Theatre, first as a set designer, then later as an actor. He also supported himself as a relief announcer for Radio Eireann.

== Career ==
O'Herlihy's first notable acting role came in 1944, when he played the lead in the Gate's production of Red Roses For Me, written and directed by Seán O'Casey. He appeared in some fifty plays at the Gate. He made his film debut in 1947 in Carol Reed's Odd Man Out, which was shot on location in Belfast, and also worked extensively in radio. His first American film role was as Macduff in Orson Welles' version of Macbeth (1948), followed by supporting roles in films such as the Red Scare fantasy Invasion, U.S.A., the Kiplingesque Soldiers Three and a series of swashbucklers, such as The Black Shield of Falworth (1954).

His career took an upward turn in 1954 when he played the title role in Luis Buñuel's Robinson Crusoe, which earned him an Academy Award nomination for Best Actor. O'Herlihy recalled that the producers of the film wanted Buñuel to use Orson Welles for the role, with Buñuel refusing, saying he was too big and too fat. They arranged a screening of Welles' Macbeth to show how a bearded Welles would look, but O'Herlihy's performance as Macduff convinced Buñuel to cast O'Herlihy instead.

O'Herlihy was later featured in 1959 in The Young Land as Judge Millard Isham and as Dave Edwards in Douglas Sirk's remake of Imitation of Life. The following year he played Sir Harry Ivers, an upper-class English drifter who joins Alan Ladd in a plot to ruin an Arizona cattle town by robbing its bank, in the western One Foot in Hell. O'Herlihy was also cast as Dr Caligari in The Cabinet of Caligari, Robert Bloch's reimagining of the German silent classic, in 1962.

In 1964, he starred in Fail Safe in the role of General Black, or "Blackie", who nukes New York on presidential orders. In 1969, he was cast in The Big Cube and 100 Rifles. In 1970, he starred in the epic Waterloo, playing the part of Michel Ney, the marshal of France. In 1982, he starred in Halloween III: Season of the Witch as Conal Cochran and in 1984, he appeared in The Last Starfighter as Grig, Alex Rogan's reptilian co-pilot, navigator and sidekick. In 1986's The Whoopee Boys he played a judge and in 1987, he appeared in RoboCop as "The Old Man". That same year, he was cast in John Huston's The Dead. In 1990, he appeared in RoboCop 2, the sequel to the 1987 film.

O'Herlihy had a fairly extensive career in television, having appeared on Rawhide, The DuPont Show with June Allyson, Adventures in Paradise and Target: The Corruptors!. He portrayed Larry "Ace" Banner in the first season of The Untouchables in the episode titled "The Big Squeeze". He was cast as Stephen Jordan in the last season of Checkmate episode " "Referendum on Murder". He also appeared on The Americans and The Man from U.N.C.L.E. in the episodes "The Fiddlesticks Affair" and "The Yo-Ho-Ho and a Bottle of Rum Affair" and on Route 66 in the episode "To Walk with the Serpent". In 1962, he was cast as Glenn Kassin in "The Earth Mover" episode of Empire. He appeared on Bonanza (episode: "The Artist" as Matthew Raine).

In 1963–1964, he was in The Travels of Jaimie McPheeters. On The Long, Hot Summer, O'Herlihy became the lead star, having replaced Edmond O'Brien in the part of Will Varner midway through the program's single-season run. In 1966, he appeared in the episode "Have You Seen the Aurora Borealis?" of The Road West, starring Barry Sullivan. In 1974, he appeared in QB VII and played the Senior American Officer, Col. Max Dodd in the second series of BBC's POW drama Colditz. In the same year he took a role in the film, The Tamarind Seed, which starred Omar Sharif and Julie Andrews.

In 1976, he guest-starred in an episode of Gibbsville. In 1978, he guest-starred in the second part of the Battlestar Galactica episode "Gun on Ice Planet Zero" as Dr Ravishol. O'Herlihy also portrayed the ill-fated lumber tycoon Andrew Packard in the cult television program Twin Peaks (1991) and in the Batman: The Animated Series episode "Deep Freeze", voicing the villainous theme park mogul Grant Walker. In 1998, O'Herlihy acted in his last film, The Rat Pack, playing Joseph P. Kennedy Sr.

== Personal life ==
Dan O'Herlihy married Elsie Bennett in 1945. He was the brother of director Michael O'Herlihy, and the father of actor Gavan O'Herlihy, architect Lorcan O'Herlihy, and visual artist-turned-theatrical producer Olwen O'Herlihy. One grandchild, Micaela O'Herlihy, is a filmmaker whose work has been shown at the Sundance Film Festival. Another, Alana O'Herlihy, is a photographer and director who has collaborated with Miley Cyrus.

He also founded an acting school in Hollywood with Charles Davis in 1955.

O'Herlihy became a naturalized U.S. citizen in 1983.

=== Death ===
O'Herlihy died of natural causes in Malibu, California in 2005, aged 85. His personal papers are held in the University College Dublin Archives.

== Filmography ==
=== Film ===
Dan O'Herlihy film credits
Year	Title	Role	Notes
1947	Hungry Hill	Harry Brodrick	
1947	Odd Man Out	Nolan	
1948	Larceny	Duke	
1948	Macbeth	MacDuff	
1948	Kidnapped	Alan Breck	
1950	The Iroquois Trail	Lieutenant Blakely	
1951	Soldiers Three	Sergeant Murphy	
1951	The Highwayman	Robin	
1951	The Desert Fox: The Story of Rommel	Commando Captain	Uncredited
1951	The Blue Veil	Hugh Williams	
1952	At Sword's Point	Aramis Jr.	
1952	Actor's and Sin	Alfred O'Shea / The Narrator	Segment: "Actor's Blood"
1952	Operation Secret	Mike Duncan	
1952	Invasion, U.S.A.	Mr. Ohman	
1953	Sword of Venus	Danglars	
1954	Robinson Crusoe	Robinson Crusoe / Crusoe's father	
1954	The Black Shield of Falworth	Prince Hal	
1954	Bengal Brigade	Captain Ronald Blaine	
1955	The Purple Mask	Brisquet	
1955	The Virgin Queen	Lord Derry	
1957	That Woman Opposite	Dermot Kinross	
1958	Home Before Dark	Arnold Bronn	
1959	Imitation of Life	David Edward	
1959	The Young Land	Judge Millard Isham	
1960	A Terrible Beauty	Don McGinnis	
1960	One Foot in Hell	Sir Harry Ivers	
1961	King of the Roaring '20s: The Story of Arnold Rothstein	Detective Phil Butler	
1962	The Cabinet of Caligari	Caligari / Paul	
1964	Fail Safe	General Black	
1969	How to Steal the World	Professor David Garrow	
1969	The Big Cube	Charles Winthrop	
1969	100 Rifles	Steven Grimes	
1970	Waterloo	Marshal Michel Ney	
1972	The Carey Treatment	J.D. Randall	
1974	The Tamarind Seed	Fergus Stephenson	
1977	MacArthur	President Franklin D. Roosevelt	
1982	Halloween III: Season of the Witch	Conal Cochran	
1984	The Last Starfighter	Grig	
1986	The Whoopee Boys	Judge Stenrhill	
1987	RoboCop	The Old Man	
1987	The Dead	Mr. Browne	
1990	RoboCop 2	The Old Man	

=== Television ===
Dan O'Herlihy television credits
Year	Title	Role	Notes
1955	Screen Directors Playhouse	Dr Donald Kent	Episode: "The Final Tribute"
1960	The DuPont Show with June Allyson	Davide	1 episode
1960	The Untouchables	Larry "Ace" Banner	Episode: "The Big Squeeze"
1960	Rawhide	John Cord	1 episode
1961	The Americans	Col. Fry	1 episode
1961	Target: The Corruptors!	Walter Cannon	1 episode
1961–62	Adventures in Paradise	Seth Wilkerson / Colonel Tomlinson	2 episodes
1962	Route 66	John Westerbrook	Episode: "To Walk with the Serpent"
1962	Checkmate	Stephen Jordan	Episode: "Referendum on Murder"
1962	Bonanza	Matthew Raine	Episode: "The Artist" (S4.E3)
1962	Empire	Glenn Kassin	Episode: "The Earth Mover"
1963	The Alfred Hitchcock Hour	Simon Carter	Episode: "Forecast: Low Clouds and Coastal Fog" (S1.E17)
1963	Combat!		Episode: "The Chateau"
1963–64	The Travels of Jaimie McPheeters	Dr Sardius McPheeters	26 episodes
1965	The Man from U.N.C.L.E.	Marcel Rudolph	Episode: "The Fiddlesticks Affair"
1966	The Long, Hot Summer	"Boss" Will Varner	12 episodes
1966	The Road West	Seamus O'Flaherty	Episode: "Have You Seen the Aurora Borealis?"
1967	Mission: Impossible	Jack Cole	1 episode
1967	The Man from U.N.C.L.E.	Capt. Rupert Oliver Morton	Episode: "The Yo-Ho-Ho and a Bottle of Rum Affair"
1974	Colditz	Lt. Col. Max Dodd	5 episodes
1976	Gibbsville	Walter Culligan	1 episode
1977	The Bionic Woman	Harry Walker	1 episode
1978	Battlestar Galactica	Dr Ravashol	Episode: "Gun on Ice Planet Zero"
1979	A Man Called Sloane	The Director	12 episodes
1984	The Secret Servant	Professor John Tyler	3 episodes
1988	L.A. Law	Vernon Kepler	Episode: "Chariots of Meyer" (S2.E20)
1989	The Equalizer	Randall Payne	Episode: "Prisoners of Conscience"
1991	Twin Peaks	Andrew Packard	6 episodes
1994	Batman: The Animated Series	Grant Walker (voice)	Episode: "Deep Freeze" (S3.E10)

==== TV films and miniseries ====
Dan O'Herlihy television credits
Year	Title	Role	Notes
1951	The Last Half Hour: The Mayerling Story	Rudolf, Crown Prince of Austria	
1972	The People	Sol Diemus	
1974	QB VII	David Shawcross	
1976	Banjo Hackett: Roamin' Free	"Tip" Conaker	
1976	The Quest: The Longest Drive	Mathew Hatcher	
1977	Good Against Evil	Father Kemschler	
1977	Woman on the Run	Crandell	
1977	Deadly Game	Colonel Edward Stryker	
1979	Mark Twain: Beneath the Laughter	Mark Twain	
1981	Death Ray 2000	The Director	
1981	Artemis 81	Albrecht Von Drachenfels	
1983	The Last Day	American Ambassador	
1986	Dark Mansions	Alexander Drake	
1988	A Waltz Through the Hills	Uncle Tom	
1993	Love, Cheat & Steal	Hamilton Fisk	
1998	The Rat Pack	Joe Kennedy	

== Partial stage credits ==
Year	Title	Role	Venue	Notes
1940	Three to Go	Captain Oxenham	Abbey Theatre, Dublin	
1941	Lord Edward	Henry Charles Sirr	Gate Theatre, Dublin	
1942	The Strings are False	Alec	Olympia Theatre, Dublin	
1943	Red Roses for Me	Ayamonn Breydon	Olympia Theatre, Dublin	
1944	Red Roses for Me	Ayamonn Breydon	Gate Theatre, Dublin	
1947	Macbeth	Macduff	Kingsbury Hall, Salt Lake City	For Mercury Theatre
1949	The Ivy Green	Charles Dickens	Lyceum Theatre, New York City	
1961	Measure for Measure		University of California, Los Angeles	Directed by John Houseman
1972	The White House	J.J.	Abbey Theatre, Dublin	
1972	A Better Place	Bill Walker	Gate Theatre, Dublin	
1980	King Lear	Lear	Miller Outdoor Theatre, Houston	
1982	Mass Appeal		Drury Lane Theatre, Oakbrook	
1987	The Last Hero	Charles Lindstrom	Abbey Theatre, Dublin	
1996	Long Day's Journey into Night	James Tyrone Sr	Stamford Center for the Arts, Stamford	For American Repertory Theater

== Accolades ==
Award	Year	Category	Work	Result
Academy Award	1955	Best Actor	Robinson Crusoe	Nominated
Western Heritage Award	1961	Fictional Television Drama	Rawhide ("Incident at Dragoon Crossing")	Won

== See also ==
- List of Irish actors
- List of Academy Award winners and nominees from Ireland
- List of actors with Academy Award nominations
