= Henry Feilden =

Henry Feilden may refer to:

- Henry Feilden (Conservative politician) (1818–1875), English Conservative politician
- Henry Wemyss Feilden (1838–1921), British Army officer, Arctic explorer and naturalist
- Sir Henry Wemyss Feilden, 6th Baronet (1916–2010), of the Feilden baronets
- Sir Henry Rudyard Feilden, 7th Baronet (1951–2024), of the Feilden baronets

== See also ==
- Henry Fielding (disambiguation)
- Feilden (surname)
