= Jeanie Dicks =

British electrical engineer, electrified Winchester Cathedral

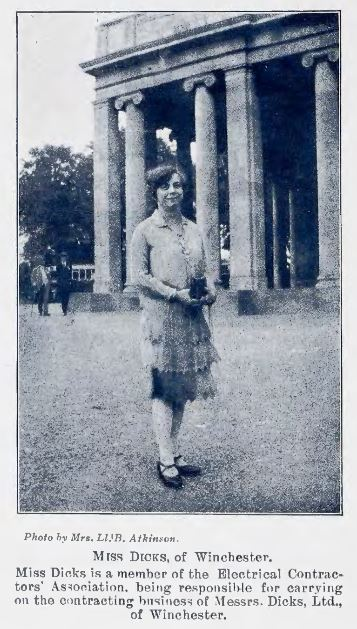
- Jeanie Dicks in 1929. (Photo by Mrs L.V.B. Atkinson)
- Born: Maude Jeanie Dicks; 25 September 1893; Winchester, Hampshire
- Died: 6 July 1980 (aged 86)
- Other name: Mrs Ian McVean
- Occupation: Engineer
- Known for: Oversaw the installation of electricity into Winchester Cathedral in 1934

Jeanie Dicks (25 September 1893 – 6 July 1980) was a British engineer. She led the permanent electrification of Winchester Cathedral in 1934. She was a member of the Electrical Contractors Association, one of the first women to join, and President of the Winchester Chamber of Commerce.

== Early life ==
Maude Jeanie Dicks was born on 25 September 1893, in Winchester, Hampshire to Frances Maude (née Henning) and Philip Dicks. Her father owned and ran a gas and plumbing shop which his father, John Dicks, had opened in 1862. She was baptised at St Maurice's Church on 17 January 1894, alongside her older brother Philip John.

== Career ==
In 1926, after the sudden death of her father Philip, Dicks took over the family firm, which was by now known as Messrs. Dicks Ltd of Winchester and specialised in the installation of gas and electric lighting.

In 1934, the company, now J. Dicks Ltd., won the contract to install electric light and heating in Winchester Cathedral against competition from other British and continental firms. The company was noted as having a staff of 75 and Dicks was said to manage "not only the electrical contracting side, but also the water engineering, radio and plumbing departments".

Two years prior to this contract, during work to lay central heating pipes in the nave of the cathedral, Dicks had prepared the ground by also installing electrical cables. However, the work to replace the choir-stall gaslights entailed running cables through the crypt, which forced the removal and reburial of several coffins, although that of Jane Austen was only slightly displaced.

To ensure that the lighting was correct, Dicks and two of her staff, foreman Charlie Wicks and Ralph Slade, spent many evenings in the cathedral with the two men up in the roof experimenting with different types of lighting for Dicks to judge for effectiveness down in the nave. The extensive trials resulted in her recommendation for lights hidden by frosted glass. She had a reputation for knowing what “looks right”.

On 11 April 1934 The Illustrated London News ran a picture of the floodlit cathedral interior, noting that five miles of cable had been required. The work for the cathedral was completed in 1938.

Also in 1934, West Riding County Council contracted Dicks Ltd. to provide the electrical work for a new sanatorium for women and children at Scotton Banks, near Knaresborough. The total project would cost £100,000, Dicks Ltd. part was £14,498.

Dicks encountered a certain amount of sexism where clients insisted on speaking with her male staff but rose above it to ensure that her firm was hired by well-heeled clients. Ralph Slade later said that "she wasn’t an easy lady to work for but she was always a fair one and her employees stayed with her".

She joined the Women's Engineering Society in 1925, when she was described as "an expert on wireless", who had been elected by the Lyceum Club Radio Circle as their representative at meetings of the Radio Society of Great Britain. In 1928, Dicks was a founder member of the Hampshire branch of the Electrical Association for Women, acting as its Honorary Secretary. She was also a member of the Electrical Contractors Association in 1929, and described as "England's only woman member" of the association in 1934, presumably making her one of the first women to join. She was described, in 1937, by the Bournemouth Graphic as being "one of the few women who are qualified engineers". She was one of the few women in the interwar period to have a radio amateur call sign, 6JN, registered to her at 53 Upper Brook Street, London W1.

Dicks retired in 1960. The business was sold in two parts, with four staff members (including Ralph Slade) buying the electrical contracting side from Dicks for one pound and naming the new firm Dicks (Electrical Installations) Ltd. The company entered into a Company Voluntary Arrangement in October 2018.

== Personal life ==
On 5 April 1937, she married Ian McVean, a traveller for Beeston Boiler Company, from Glasgow. The Dean of Winchester, Gordon Selwyn, who had commissioned the heating and electrification work, performed the ceremony in Winchester Cathedral and all the staff were invited to the service. As a wedding gift, the Dean gave the couple an inscribed a copy of his book, The Story of Winchester Cathedral, which had been especially bound in white vellum.

In March 1939, it was reported that Dicks, under her married name, had been elected President of the Winchester Chamber of Commerce.

The 1939 England and Wales Register (Census) taken on 29 September, records that Dicks lived in Flat 3, Lansdown House, Winchester, with her husband Ian, and Alice Rance, their housekeeper. As well as recording her position as managing director of "Heating engineers, Electrical engineers, Plumbers" she is listed as an ARP Ambulance Driver as part of the Home Front war effort at the beginning of World War Two. The couple later moved into the Dicks family home 'Limberlost' on St Giles Hill in Winchester.

In 1954, she was president of the Electrical Industry Benevolent Association, Hants and Dorset branch.

Dicks died on 6 July 1980 and was commemorated by the Hampshire Chronicle as "one of the City’s leading business women over a period of 40 years". Her funeral was held at St. Johns Church, Winchester.

== Recognition ==
Winifred Holtby, the novelist and journalist, referred to her in her seminal 1935 book Women and a Changing Civilisation as:

without thinking too much about it they have as successfully broken the line between "women's interests" and "men's interests", as the English woman electrical engineer, Miss Jeanie Dicks, who secured the contract for rewiring Winchester Cathedral.
