= Arthur Aston =

Arthur Aston may refer to:

- Sir Arthur Aston (governor) (died 1627), proprietary governor of Avalon
- Sir Arthur Aston (army officer) (1590–1649), English soldier and Royalist
- Sir Arthur Ingram Aston (1798–1836), English diplomat
- Arthur Aston (cricketer) (1875–1949), English cricketer, barrister and judge
- Arthur Vincent Aston (1886–1981), colonial administrator in British Malaya
