= Aubyn Trevor-Battye =

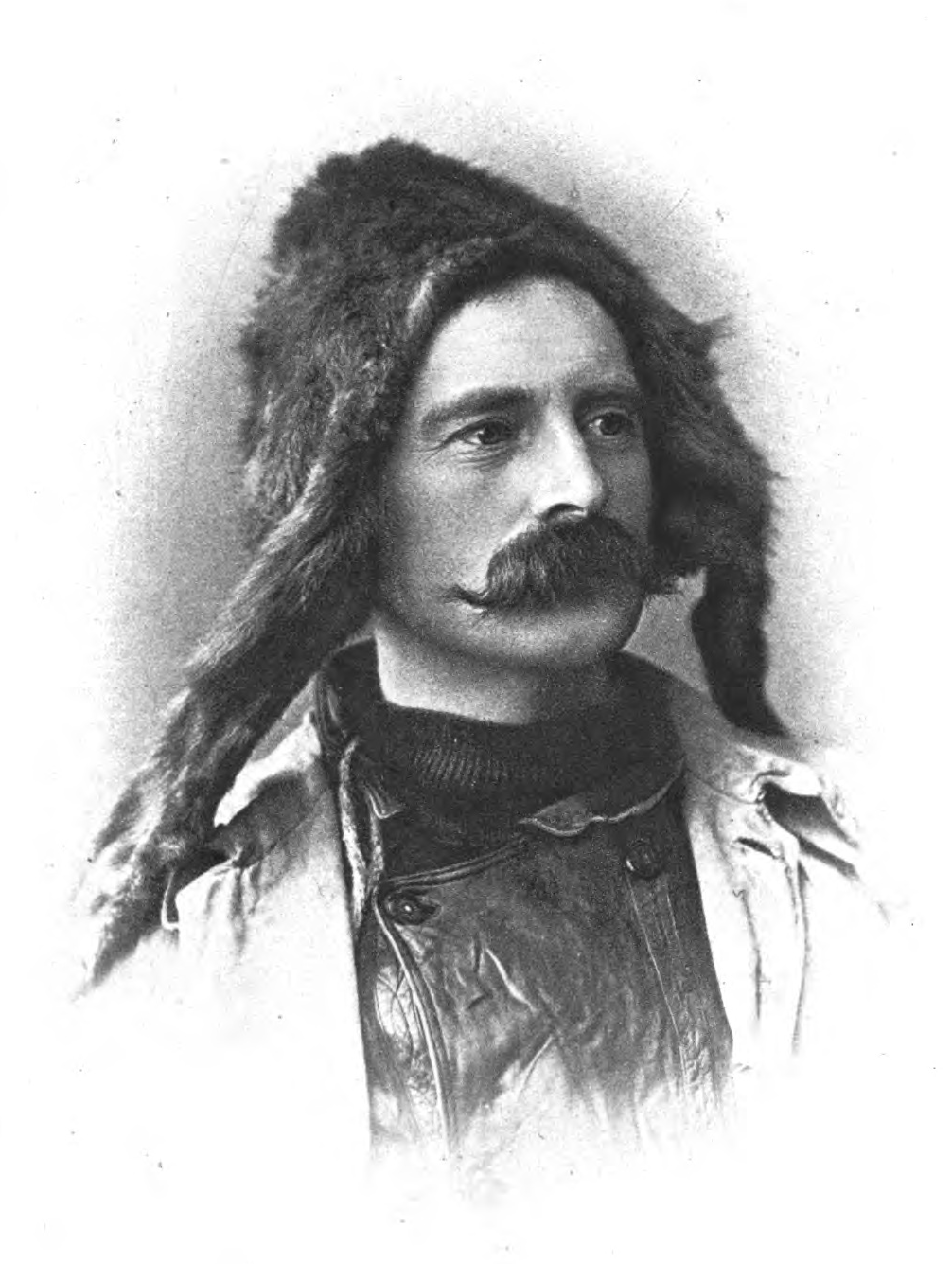

Aubyn Bernard Rochfort Trevor-Battye MA, MBOU, FLS, FRGS, FZS (17 July 1855 – 19/20 December 1922) was a British gentleman traveller, naturalist, and writer. He wrote several books based on his travels through the European arctic regions and to Africa and Asia. His books included his own illustrations and poetry.

== Life and work ==
Trevor-Battye was born at Hever, Kent, where his father, the Reverend William Wilberforce Battye, was rector. His mother was daughter of Edmund Wakefield Meade-Waldo, resident of Hever Castle. The Rev. W.W. Battye was a descendant of Sir John Trevor (1626-1672) and inherited Trevor estates in 1883. Upon his death in 1890 his surviving family took the heraldic arms of Trevor and the surname Trevor-Battye.

He went to school at St Edward's School, Oxford. After graduating from Christ Church, Oxford, in 1887, Aubyn Trevor-Battye travelled widely in North America and Europe, studying ornithology, shooting game and fishing. In 1894, inspired by Henry Wemyss Feilden, he made an expedition to the Russian island of Kolguyev in the Barents Sea to study its natural history, especially the birds, and the topography (Trevor-Battye 1895). He and his friend M. W. Powys and an assistant Thomas Hyland had to make a long unplanned return through northern Russia as winter closed in. They were marooned briefly and their team was considered lost. A rescue was planned by his brother Charles Edmund Augustine Trevor Trevor-Battye (1853–1931). The adventure brought Trevor-Battye to prominence on his return to Britain. He was then invited to join William Martin Conway's expedition to Spitsbergen in 1896, as their zoologist.

During a period devoted to writing and editing he married Margaret Amy Graham on 1 May 1901 who died of tuberculosis in 1906. He later resumed his travels and studies of natural history. He travelled extensively in Europe, often on collecting expeditions or visiting zoological gardens. He made two visits to southern Africa (1905 and 1910), and explored Crete in 1908 and a second time, probably 1909 (Trevor-Battye 1913). In 1914 he travelled in India, Nepal and Sikkim in company with Henry John Elwes. He described the birds he encountered, including the tameness of geese in Rajputana, and the feeding of birds by Jains in Ahmedabad.

After the 1914-1918 War he resumed his writing and editing, but due to deteriorating health he moved to the Canary Islands. He died there, at Las Palmas, on the 19th or 20 December 1922, aged 67.

He published four books of his own and a chapter in the Spitsbergen report and over 20 papers in learned journals, mainly about ornithology. He was elected to the Royal Geographical Society in November 1896. He was editor to the natural history section of the Victoria History of the Counties of England series (c. 1899-1902) and he edited some writings of his friend Lord Lilford (Trevor-Battye 1903). Other publications included short stories and popular articles and he edited many other articles.

== Books ==
- Trevor-Battye, Aubyn (1894) Pictures in prose. Longmans Green, London
- Trevor-Battye, Aubyn (1895) Ice-bound on Kolguev. Constable, London
- Trevor-Battye, Aubyn (1897) "Report upon Ekman Bay and Dickson Bay", in: The first crossing of Spitsbergen by Sir William Martin Conway, Dent, London
- Trevor-Battye, Aubyn (1898) A northern highway of the Tsar. Constable, London
- Trevor-Battye, Aubyn (ed.) (1903) Lord Lilford on birds. Hutchinson, London
- Trevor-Battye, Aubyn (1913) Camping in Crete. Witherby, London

== Biographies ==
- Branch, M (1970). "British travellers among the Samoyeds". Journal de la Société Finno-Ougrienne. 72: 42–55.
- Horder, M (1974) "Trevor-Battye: a Victorian in the Arctic". The Cornhill Magazine, no 1079: 228-237.
- Evans, M.H. (2005) "Aubyn B.R. Trevor-Battye, 1855-1922". Unpublished annotated biography, typescript copies at the Royal Geographical Society, Christ Church (Oxford) and the Scott Polar Research Institute.
- Obituary: "First explorer of Kolguev. Death of Mr Trevor-Battye". The Times Dec 22, 1922, p. 12.
- Obituary: "Aubyn Bernard Rochfort Trevor-Battye". Ibis 332-334, 1923.
- Obituary: "Aubyn Bernard Rochfort Trevor-Battye". The Avicultural Magazine 4th ser, 1 p. 9, 1923.
