= Henry John Pearson =

British industrialist and ornithologist

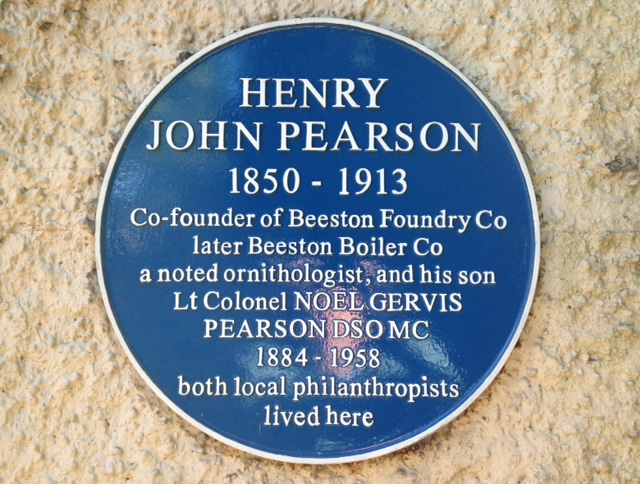
Henry John Pearson, Blue Plaque

Henry John Pearson, FRGS (29 August 1850 in Chilwell, Nottinghamshire – 8 February 1913 in Asyut, Egypt) was a British ornithologist, naturalist, businessman and explorer of the Far North of Europe.

== Biography ==
The eldest son of Mr. J. R. Pearson and his wife Elizabeth, Henry John Pearson took an interest in natural history from an early age with a special interest in birds and his natural history collection of birds' eggs. After becoming a success in business, he acquired the money and leisure time to lead expeditions to the Far North of Europe for investigations in ornithology and natural history. In the summer of 1893, accompanied by his brother Charles and Mr. Edward Bidwell, Henry J. Pearson made an expedition to the Far North of Norway, where they acquired eggs from 47 different species of birds. In 1894, with his brother Charles, he visited the southern Fiskivötn district of Iceland, making interesting fieldnotes on birds, especially in regard to the nesting of the harlequin duck. The ornithological findings for these 1893 and 1894 expeditions were published in The Ibis.

In 1895 Pearson and his brother Charles chartered the small yacht Saxon. On this voyage with a party including the Rev. H. H. Slater and Colonel H. W. Feilden, they visited the Murman coast of Russian Lapland and spent some time in the vicinity of Lutni on the Ukanskoe River. The expedition spent ten days on Kolguyev Island and considerable time on Novaya Zemlya. Henry Pearson gathered in Lapland eggs of Buffon's skua and in Kolguyev the young of Bewicke's swan and the eggs of little stints and grey plover. The expedition visited the breeding places of glaucous gulls and the vast colonies of Brünnich's guillemots in Novaya Zemlya.

In 1897 Henry Pearson chartered the Laura, a Norwegian sailing ship. The veteran Arctic navigator Kjeldsen was the sailing master with a Norwegian crew. Colonel H. W. Feilden accompanied the expedition, and Frederick Curtis was its medical officer. The expedition explored Vaygach Island, Khabarova and the Russian inland in the vicinity, and Dolgoi Island. The explorers made a prolonged stay in Novaya Zemlya and Lütke Land, navigated the Matochkin Shar, and entered the Kara Sea, and reached the Pachtussoff Islands in latitude 74° 24′ on the east coast of Lütke Land. The ornithological results were published in The Ibis for 1898. Subsequently, Henry J. Pearson published an account of the voyages of the Saxon and the Laura in the book Beyond Petsora Eastward, making a significant contribution to knowledge of European Arctic ornithology, geology, and botany.

In 1899, 1901, and 1903, Henry Pearson visited Russian Lapland. The 1899 expedition, accompanied by Charles Pearson, investigated the Pechenga River and the lands of the gulf of the same name, also the surrounding district. The 1901 expedition, accompanied by Henry Pearson's son Hetley, explored at various places from Kildin Island to Svyatoy Nos, visited Kanin Peninsula on the eastern side of the White Sea, and made a brief landing on Korga Island at the northeast corner of Kanin Peninsula. The 1903 expedition, accompanied by Mr. J. P. Musters, explored the interior of Russian Lapland, visiting the area of the Kola Peninsula near Pulozero and southwards. The 1903 expedition collected the young of the bar-tailed godwit and the dusky redshank, which were discovered to be breeding in the district by Mr. Witherby in 1899. The results of the Pearson expeditions of 1899, 1901, and 1903 were published in the book Three Summers among the Birds of Russian Lapland.

Henry J. Pearson was a fellow of The Royal Geographical Society, a member of the British Ornithologists' Club and British Ornithologists' Union, and a member of The Royal Horticultural Society, serving on its council for a number of years. Upon his death in 1913, his body was buried in the English cemetery in Cairo, Egypt. In 1914, his coffin was disinterred, transported to England, and reburied in Attenborough Churchyard.

== Business activities ==
Henry John Pearson formed a company (Foster and Pearson) with Robert Foster to manufacture and supply glasshouses. However, in 1893 he joined forces with his younger brother Louis Frederick Pearson to form the Beeston Foundry Company and was its first chairman. It subsequently changed its name to the Beeston Boiler Company, becoming a major employer in Beeston, near Nottingham.

== Bibliography ==
- Pearson, Henry J.; Feilden, Colonel H.W. (2012) [1899]. "Beyond Petsora Eastward" : Two Summer Voyages to Novaya Zemlya and the Islands of Barents Sea (originally published London 1899; electronic ed.). Cambridge: Cambridge University Press.
