= Feilden =

Feilden may refer to:

== People ==
- Bernard Feilden (1919–2008), British conservation architect
- Bob Feilden (1917–2004), British mechanical engineer
- Gerry Feilden (1904–1981), British general and horse racing identity
- Henry Feilden (disambiguation)
- Joseph Feilden (Blackburn MP) (1792–1870), British politician
- Joseph Feilden (British Army officer) (1824–1895), British army officer and politician
- Richard Feilden (1950–2005), British architect
- William Feilden (1772–1850), British politician

== Horse racing ==
- Feilden Stakes
- Gerry Feilden Hurdle

== Other uses ==
- Feilden baronets

== See also ==
- Fielden
