= Micaela O'Herlihy =

American artist

Micaela O'Herlihy is a multimedia artist best known for her short experimental film A Thunderperfect Mind which premiered at the 2004 Sundance Film Festival.

Micaela paints and draws on paper, cloth and film. She works in sound, paint, paper, trash, 16 and 8 mm film, burlap, DV and cardboard. She ventured into film when she realized she was constantly trying to make her paintings move. Her sole collaborator is her son Thurman Fionn.

In 1999 she received a BFA in painting from San Francisco Art Institute and in 2003 an MFA in film from University of Wisconsin–Milwaukee. Her recent day jobs have included adjunct professor, translator for people with severe speech impediments, farm laborer, urology technician, and paranormal videographer.

Her grandfather is Academy Award-nominated actor Dan O'Herlihy (of RoboCop and Twin Peaks), and her siblings are Colin O'Herlihy and Eilis O'Herlihy. Andrew Martinez (aka The Naked Guy) was O'Herlihy's first boyfriend.

She now lives near Viroqua, Wisconsin, and is teaching an unstill life class at the Youth Initiative High School.

== Recent film screenings ==
- Periwinkle Cinema San Francisco 2011
- Grand Arts Missouri 2007
- Ann Arbor Film Festival Tour Nationwide 2004
- Sundance Film Festival Utah 2004
- Consolidated Works Seattle 2003
- Women in the Directors Chair Chicago 2003
- Echo Park Film Center Los Angeles 2002
