= Henry Wemyss Feilden =

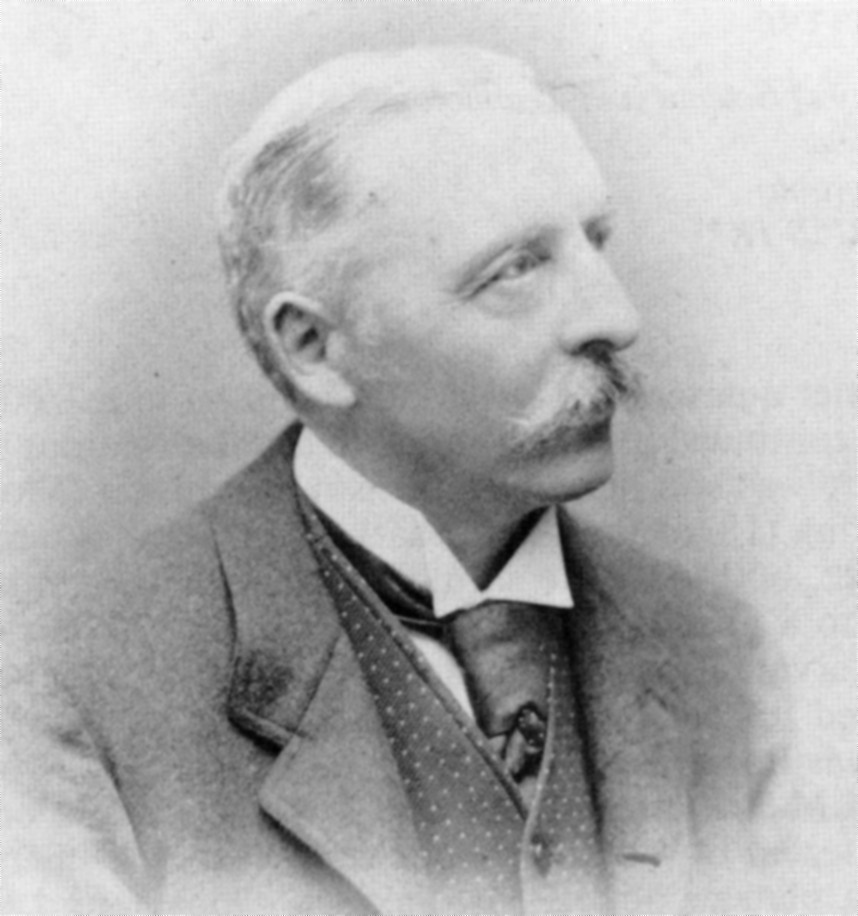
Henry Wemyss Feilden

Colonel Henry Wemyss Feilden, CB (6 October 1838 – 8 June 1921) was a British Army officer, Arctic explorer and naturalist.

== Biography ==
Feilden was the second son of Sir William Henry Feilden (1812−1879), 2nd Baronet of Feniscowles. Feilden was born at Newbridge Barracks in County Kildare where his father was then serving in the 17th Lancers. He was educated at Cheltenham College. After joining the Black Watch, at the age of nineteen, he fought in the suppression of the Indian Mutiny 1857-58 and at the Taku Forts in China in 1860. In 1862 he volunteered for the Confederate States Army during the American Civil War of 1861−1865. He served as assistant adjutant-general with the remnant of the Army of Tennessee under General Joseph E. Johnston and was present at the surrender at Bennett Place.

He then returned to the British Army, where he made captain in the Royal Artillery in 1874. He served in the First Boer War in 1881 and again in Africa in 1890. After the outbreak of the Second Boer War, he was again appointed Paymaster of Imperial Yeomanry on 3 February 1900. He was decorated for his service in India, China and South Africa, and was appointed a Companion of the Order of the Bath (CB) for his services to Imperial Yeomanry in 1900.

Feilden also collected information on the geology, flora and fauna of newly explored areas, and served as naturalist on Sir George Nares' British Arctic Expedition of 1875–76 on board Alert. During his service in Pegu, he contributed notes on the birds of the region to Allan Octavian Hume. He was a fast friend of the famous writer and poet Rudyard Kipling. The surgeon on HMS Alert, Dr Edward L. Moss, held a low opinion of Feilden's scientific expertise.

In 1864, Feilden married Julia, daughter of Judge David James McCord (1797–1855) of South Carolina. In 1880 Feilden settled in Wells-next-the-Sea, Norfolk. Feilden joined the Norfolk and Norwich Naturalists' Society in 1880 and became president in 1885. He lived in Norfolk for over 20 years, moving to Burwash, Sussex in 1902. One of his discoveries in 1888 was a stuffed specimen of the Great Bustard which had been shot in Norfolk. Feilden contributed to Transactions of the Norfolk and Norwich Naturalists' Society and submitted scientific papers to The Zoologist and Ibis (the journal of the British Ornithologists' Union, to which he was elected in 1873), amongst others.

In 1895 and 1897, accompanying Henry J. Pearson, Feilden partook in expeditions to Novaya Zemlya, Kolguyev, Spitsbergen, Lapland and the Kara Sea.

As well as being a Fellow of the Royal Geographical Society, Feilden was nominated as a Fellow of the Royal Society of London, but was rejected. The following is from his nomination certificate:

Was naturalist to Sir George Nares' Polar Expedition of 1875−6, when, besides making large and valuable zoological observations and collections, he laid down the geology of 300 miles of the coast of Smith's Sound, and brought home 2000 specimens, carefully localised, illustrating and confirming his surveys. On the same voyage he discovered the Miocene Flora of Grinnell's Land, his collection and observations on which form an important contribution to Heer's "Flora Fossilis Arctica." He has made three subsequent voyages to Arctic Europe and Asia, visiting Novaya Zemlya, Barents Land, Kolguev Island, Spitsbergen, and Russian Lapland, for the purpose of collating the geology, zoology, and botany of Arctic Europe with those of America…

Feilden died at his home in Burwash in 1921, aged 83, about one year after his wife Julia McCord Feilden (1837–1920). He had no children.

== Works ==
- Nares, G.S., Feilden, H.W., 1878. Narrative of a Voyage to the Polar Sea During 1875-6 in H.M. Ships Alert ̓and Discovery (sections on Ethnology, Mammalia and Ornithology, and Geology jointly with Charles Eugene De Rance)
- Pearson, Henry J.; Feilden, Colonel H.W. (2012) [1899]. "Beyond Petsora Eastward" : Two Summer Voyages to Novaya Zemlya and the Islands of Barents Sea (originally published London 1899; electronic ed.). Cambridge: Cambridge University Press.
