= Henry Fielding (disambiguation) =

Henry Fielding may refer to:

- Henry Fielding (1707–1754), English novelist and dramatist
- Henry Borron Fielding (1805–1851), English botanist (whose father was also named Henry Fielding)
- William Henry Ireland published, in 1822 Henry Fielding's Proverbs

== See also ==
- Henry Feilden (disambiguation)
