= Bugrino =

Bugrino Бугрино́
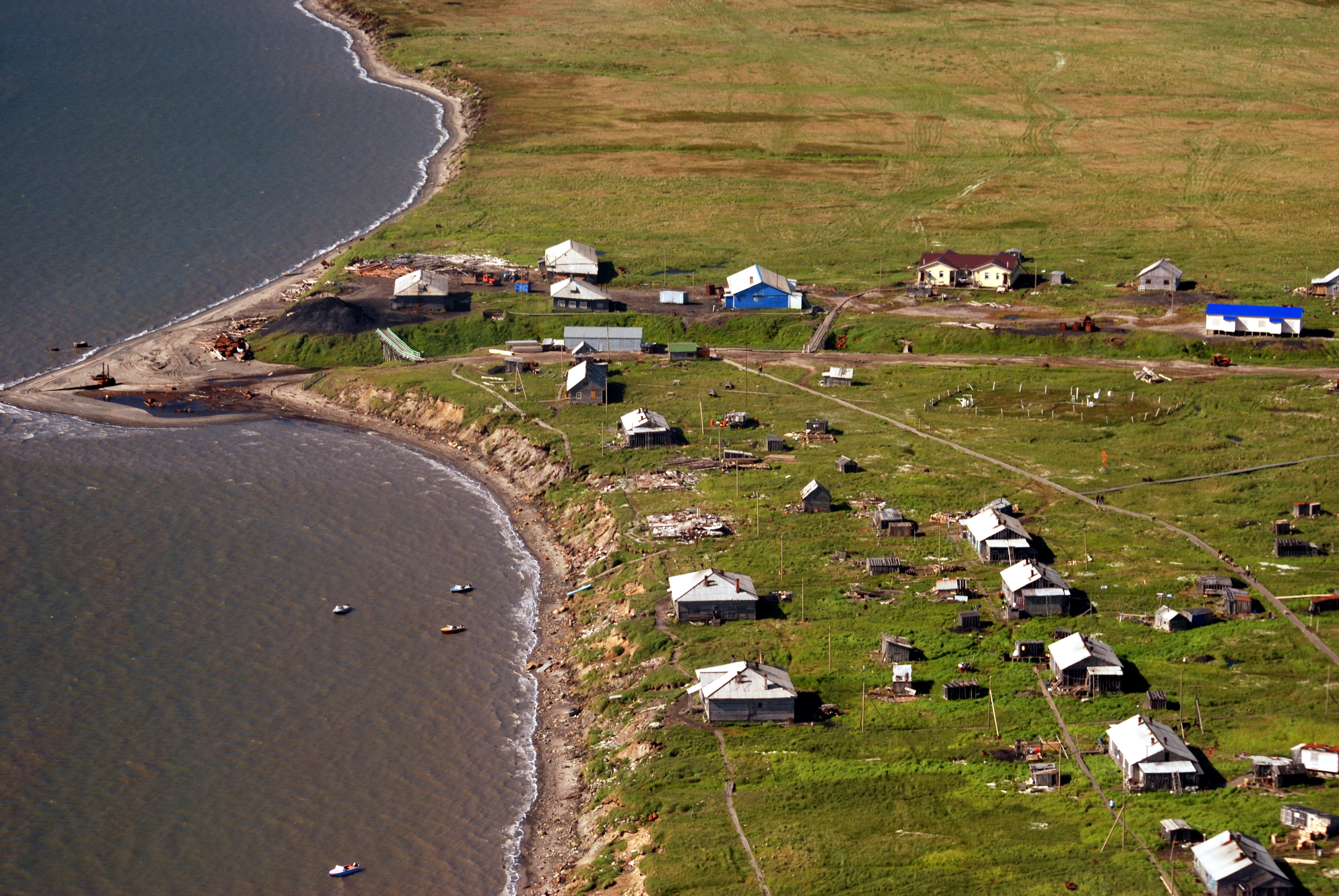

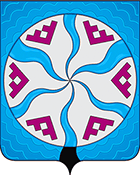
- Flag Coat of arms
- Interactive map of Bugrino
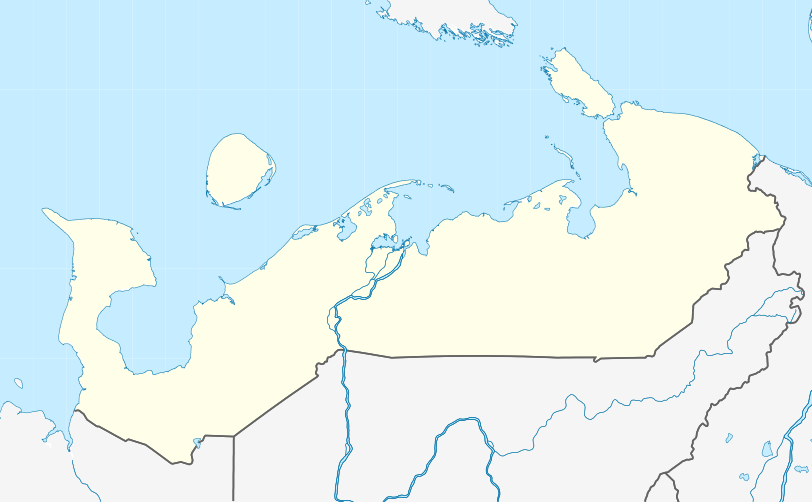
- Location of Bugrino Bugrino (Nenets Autonomous Okrug)
- Country: Russia
- Federal subject: Nenets Autonomous Okrug
- Founded: 1889

Population (2010 Census)
  - Total: 424
  - Estimate (2021): 337 (−20.5%)
- Time zone: UTC+3 (MSK)
- Postal code: 166721
- OKTMO ID: 11811451101

Bugrino (Russian: Бугрино́) is a village in the Nenets Autonomous Okrug (Arkhangelsk Oblast), Russia, the only settlement of the municipality "Kolguyevsky Village Council", on Kolguyev Island, Zapolyarny District. It had a population of 337 as of 2021.

== Geography ==
Located on Kolguyev Island, it is the administrative center of the island and part of the Nenets Autonomous Okrug. Communication between the continent and the village Bugrino oil field is carried by sea and by air in winter. Opening of the field allows the airport from November 2002 to take over the whole year average of aircraft (Yak-40, AN-24 and AN-26).

== Demographics ==
The people of Bugrino are mainly oil and gas miners, and herders.

Population
Year	Population
1920	203
1925	187
1932	26
1999	425
2002	400
2010	424
2011	436
2012	409
2013	408
2014	404
2015	407
2016	416
2017	417
2018	427
2019	427
2020	432
2021	337

== Climate ==
Bugrino has a tundra climate (ET according to the Köppen climate classification) with very cold winters and cool summers. Because of its maritime location, Bugrino and the rest of Kolguyev Island experiences seasonal lag. Precipitation is higher in summer and autumn than in winter and spring.

Climate data for Kolguyev Island (1991–2020 normals, extremes 1933–present)
Month	Jan	Feb	Mar	Apr	May	Jun	Jul	Aug	Sep	Oct	Nov	Dec	Year
Record high °C (°F)	2.3 (36.1)	2.2 (36.0)	2.3 (36.1)	8.7 (47.7)	22.1 (71.8)	27.4 (81.3)	30.0 (86.0)	29.2 (84.6)	22.1 (71.8)	12.0 (53.6)	5.8 (42.4)	4.4 (39.9)	30.0 (86.0)
Mean daily maximum °C (°F)	−7.7 (18.1)	−8.7 (16.3)	−6.7 (19.9)	−3.1 (26.4)	1.1 (34.0)	6.7 (44.1)	11.6 (52.9)	10.8 (51.4)	8.0 (46.4)	2.6 (36.7)	−1.7 (28.9)	−4.1 (24.6)	0.7 (33.3)
Daily mean °C (°F)	−10.5 (13.1)	−11.5 (11.3)	−9.5 (14.9)	−5.5 (22.1)	−1.1 (30.0)	3.8 (38.8)	8.3 (46.9)	8.3 (46.9)	5.8 (42.4)	0.9 (33.6)	−3.8 (25.2)	−6.5 (20.3)	−1.8 (28.8)
Mean daily minimum °C (°F)	−13.7 (7.3)	−14.9 (5.2)	−12.6 (9.3)	−8.3 (17.1)	−3.0 (26.6)	1.8 (35.2)	5.8 (42.4)	6.0 (42.8)	3.7 (38.7)	−1.3 (29.7)	−6.5 (20.3)	−9.4 (15.1)	−4.4 (24.1)
Record low °C (°F)	−37.6 (−35.7)	−40.1 (−40.2)	−36.0 (−32.8)	−31.6 (−24.9)	−22.5 (−8.5)	−6.2 (20.8)	−2.4 (27.7)	−2.9 (26.8)	−6.3 (20.7)	−21.2 (−6.2)	−27.5 (−17.5)	−35.5 (−31.9)	−40.1 (−40.2)
Average precipitation mm (inches)	22 (0.9)	18 (0.7)	17 (0.7)	16 (0.6)	16 (0.6)	32 (1.3)	31 (1.2)	38 (1.5)	41 (1.6)	45 (1.8)	26 (1.0)	29 (1.1)	331 (13)
Source: Погода и Климат
