= Lorcan O'Herlihy =

Irish architect (1959–2026)

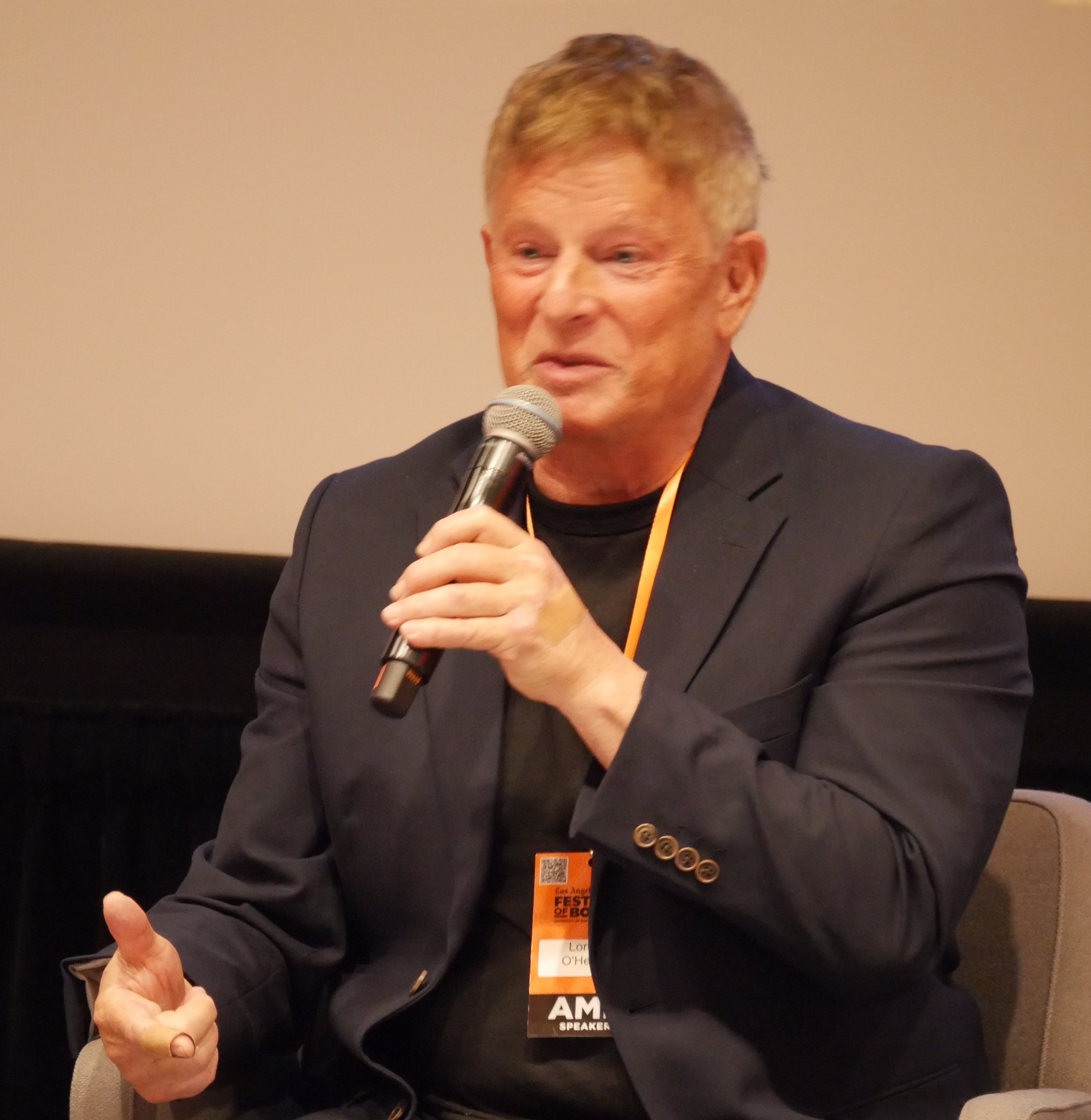
Reading at 2025 Los Angeles Book Festival

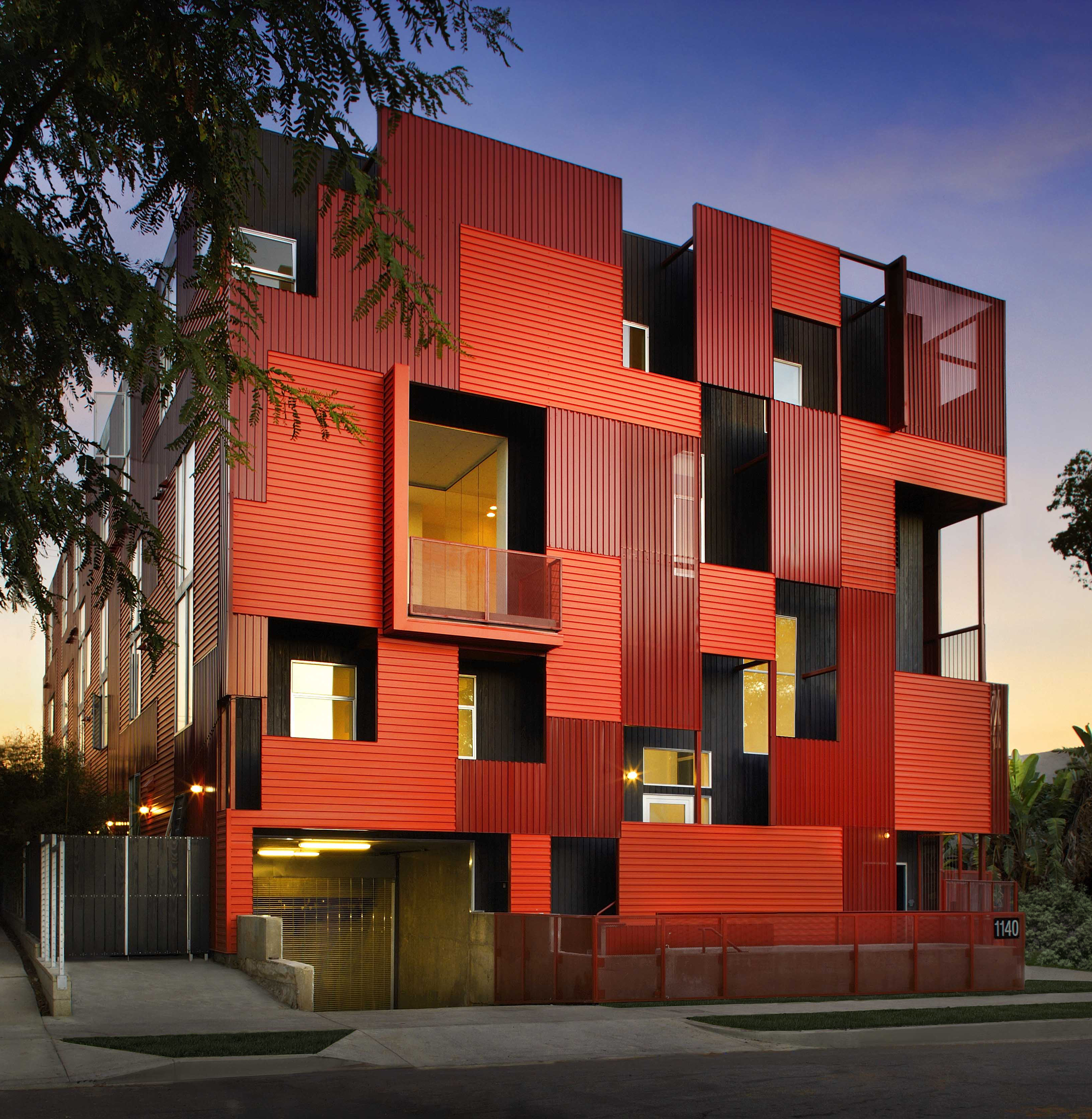
Formosa1140

Lorcan O'Herlihy (14 September 1959 – 14 June 2026) was an Irish architect working in Los Angeles and the founding principal of Lorcan O'Herlihy Architects (LOHA). He was the son and brother of actors Dan and Gavan O'Herlihy, respectively. O'Herlihy was educated at the Architectural Association in London, UK, and California Polytechnic State University San Luis Obispo.

== Life and career ==
O'Herlihy was born in Dublin, Ireland, on 14 September 1959. He worked for I. M. Pei and Partners, Kevin Roche John Dinkeloo and Associates, and Steven Holl Architects in his formative years, most notably contributing to the Grand Louvre Museum Pyramid team and the AIA National Honor Award–winning Hybrid Building in Seaside, Florida.

O'Herlihy and his firm Lorcan O'Herlihy Architects (LOHA) produced work that has been published in over 20 countries and recognized internationally with features in The New York Times, Wallpaper*, Metropolis, Architectural Record, Architectural Review, Architecture, Frame, Icon, and Interior Design, among many more. O'Herlihy's eponymous monograph was published by Rockport Publications in 1999 and Amplified Urbanism, a publication about the firm's design philosophy, was published in 2017.

LOHA's work has received over 150 national and international design awards throughout the years including the AIA Los Angeles Firm of the Year. In 2004, the Architectural League of New York selected Lorcan O’Herlihy as one of the eight "emerging voices" in the United States. In 2009, O’Herlihy was named a member of the College of Fellows of the American Institute of Architects. O’Herlihy was nominated for the 2014 American Academy of Arts and Letters Award in Architecture, the 2019 Cooper Hewitt National Design Award, and the 2018 Marcus Prize in Architecture. In 2018, O'Herlihy received the AIACC Distinguished Practice Award and his firm LOHA was ranked the #1 Design Firm in the Country by Architect Magazine’s ARCHITECT50, an annual ranking of architecture firms in the United States.

In 2021, the American Institute of Architects Los Angeles awarded O'Herlihy its Gold Medal, the highest honor the AIALA bestows.

O'Herlihy died at his home in Malibu, California, on 14 June 2026, at the age of 66.
