= Beeston Boiler Company =

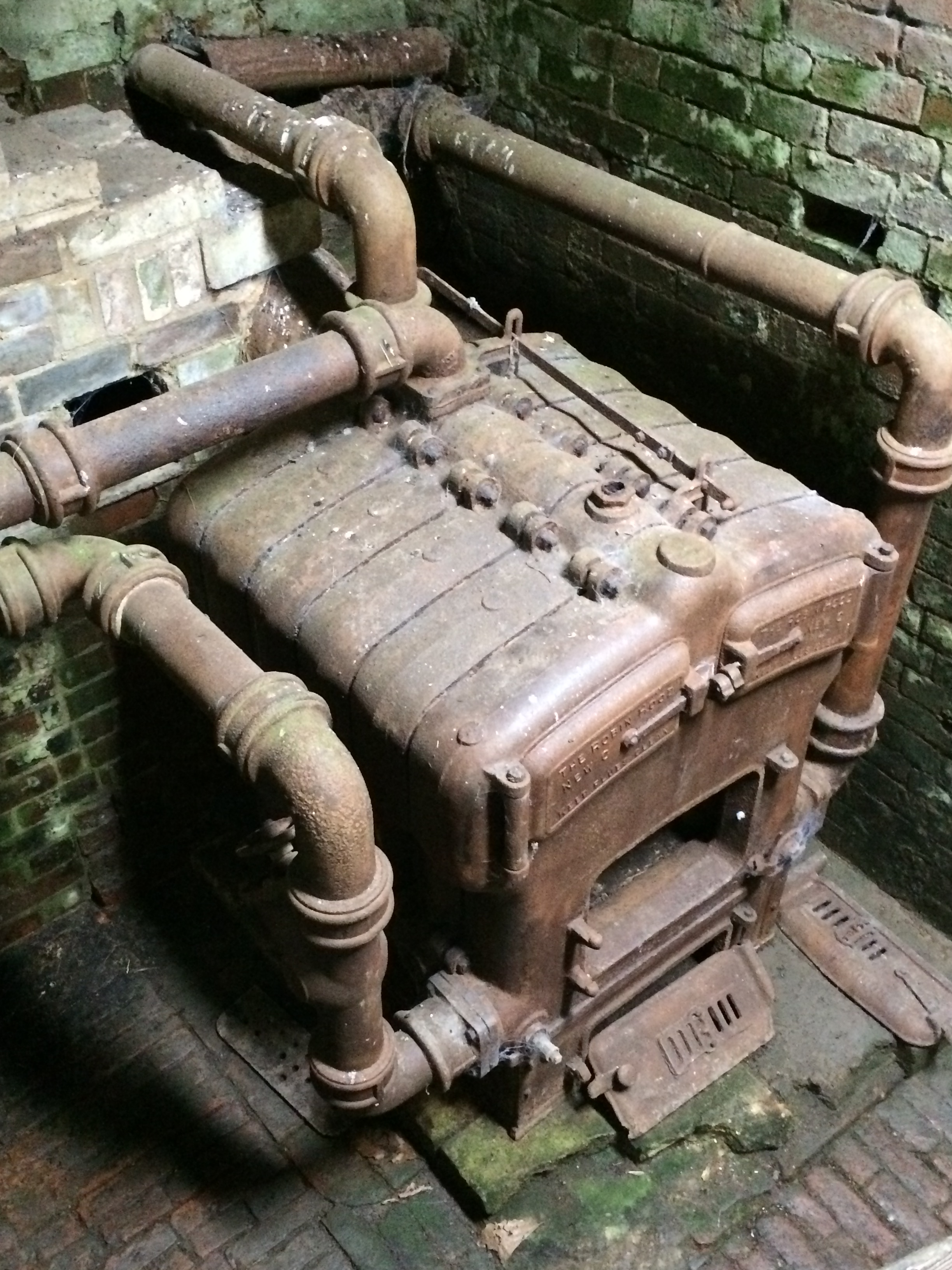
Robin Hood Boiler (C Pattern), installed at Calke Abbey, Derbyshire

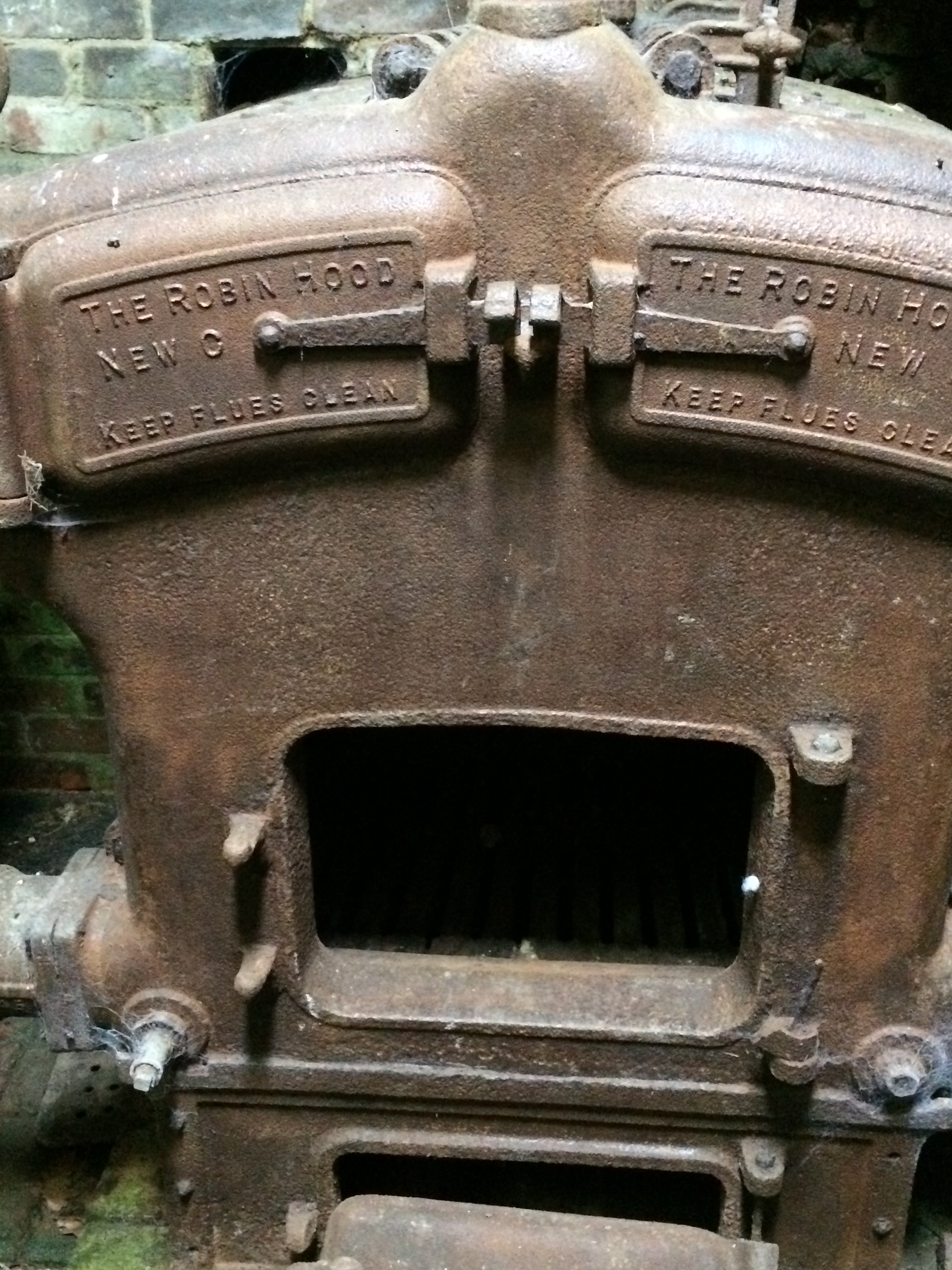
Close up of Robin Hood Boiler, Calke Abbey

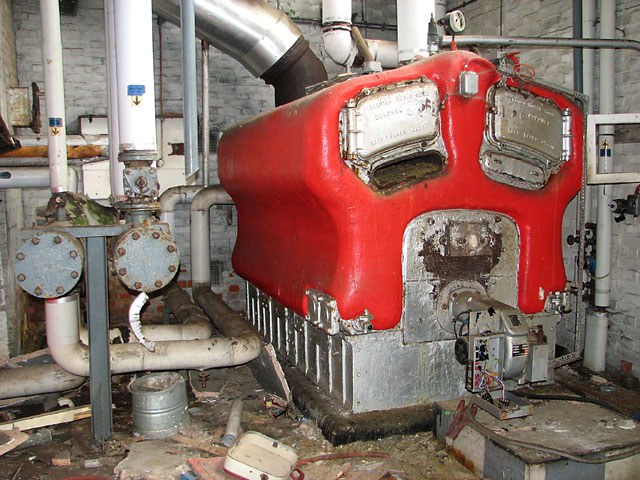
Robin Hood boiler at Hales Hospital, Hales, Norfolk

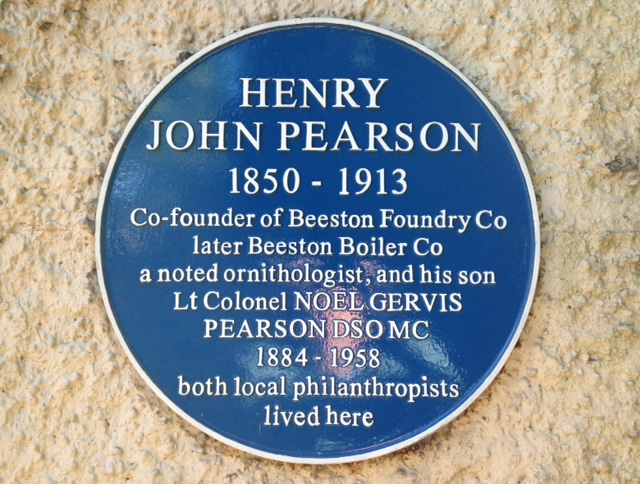
Blue plaque for Henry John Pearson, co-founder of the Beeston Boiler Company

The Beeston Boiler Company was a manufacturing company based in Nottinghamshire, England which produced industrial heating units for a wide range of uses, including commercial, horticultural and residential applications. It was founded on 10 April 1893 and its registered office was at Mona Street in Beeston near Nottingham. Originally, the company name was 'The Beeston Foundry Company Limited' but in 1923 the company changed its name to 'The Beeston Boiler Company Limited'. In 1943 it became a public company, and by 1961 was employing 850 people, and was at that time advertising itself as makers of cast iron boilers, garage and greenhouse boilers, hot water pipes, connections and cast iron valves.

The company was founded in 1893 by Henry John Pearson (1850–1913), in conjunction with his elder brother, Louis Frederick Pearson (1863–1943). Henry became the company's first chairman, followed by Louis after Henry's death. Louis Pearson then took on an important role during WWI when the company assisted with the production of munitions, eventually earning him a CBE. The company occupied a 28-acre site adjacent to the Midland Railway Company's line in Beeston, which it first occupied in 1896, and which became known to local people simply as 'The Foundry'.

In 1910 the company became engaged in some form of legal action against the Midland Railway Company, with detailed records of the litigation eventually deposited in The National Archives.

The company ran into financial difficulties during the 1970s and became insolvent; an administrative receiver was appointed in 1976.

== Robin Hood boiler ==
The Robin Hood range of boilers was introduced around the start of the 20th century, with adverts appearing in The Times as early as 1912, both for the boiler and 'Beeston radiators'.

In the 1930s, two Robin Hood boilers were installed to provide horticultural heating in the large gardens at Calke Abbey in the 1930s. One of them, a New C Pattern model, was introduced by the company in August 1930. At Calke its six sections fed three circuits, providing heat to the mushroom house, the vinery, and the cucumber houses. The boiler remains on public view in what is now a National Trust property.

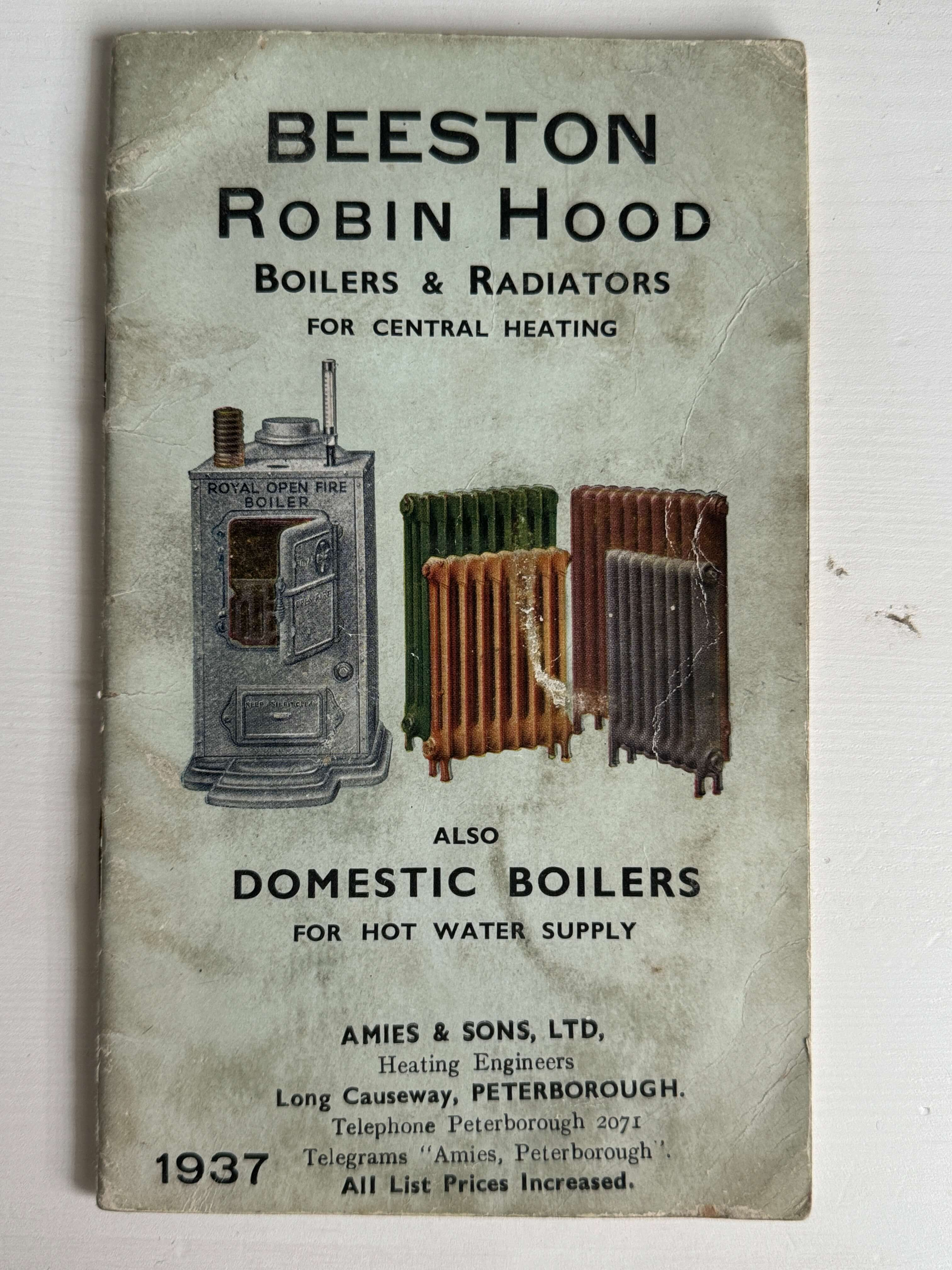
Front cover of a Beeston Robin Hood Brochure
