= Nigel Edwards (health) =

British health policy researcher

Nigel Edwards is a health policy researcher. He was Chief Executive at the Nuffield Trust from April 2014 to September 2023, before becoming a Senior Associate.

He was formerly an expert advisor with KPMG’s Global Centre of Excellence for Health and Life Sciences, a Senior Fellow at The King’s Fund. He was Policy Director of the NHS Confederation for 11 years.
