= Charles Eugene De Rance =

British historian and author (born 1847)

- Born: 22 November 1847
- Died: 9 May 1906 (aged 58); Blackpool, Lancashire, England
- Occupation(s): Writer and geologist

Charles Eugene De Rance (22 November 1847 – 9 May 1906) was a British geologist and writer.

== Early life and education ==
De Rance was born in 1847, the son of Colonel De Rance, who was a member of the French National Guard and who was exiled from his homeland during the French Revolution of 1848, the year after his son's birth. Charles's mother was also a native of France. She was the daughter of Colonel Turquand.

He studied at King's College School, London, before training in the office of engineer R. W. Mylne. He began working for the British Geological Survey in 1868. According to Professor A. C. Ramsay, who was director for England and Wales, De Rance was able to "survey a large tract with the skill of an old geologist". De Rance mainly worked in Cheshire, Flintshire and Lancashire.

== Career ==
De Rance's early papers on the Gault of Folkestone and on the Cretaceous strata in England's southwest appeared in Geological Magazine in 1868 and 1874.

He published Memoirs of the Geology of the Country Between Liverpool and Southport in 1869, followed by Memoirs of the Geology of the Country Around Southport, Lytham, and South Shore in 1872 and Memoirs of the Geology of the Country Around Blackpool, Poulton, and Fleetwood in 1875. Also in 1875, he had published Memoirs of the Geological Survey of England and Wales for Her Majesty's Stationery Office.

In 1877, he released Superficial Geology of the Country Adjoining the Coasts of S.W. Lancashire.

He published a 600-page book on The Water Supply of England and Wales in 1882.

De Rance resigned from the Geological Survey in 1898, but maintained a private practice in Blackpool as a consulting mining and water engineer.

== Death ==
De Rance died in Blackpool in 1906, eleven days after "an unfortunate accident". He was 58.
