= Louisa Fielden =

- Education: Worcester College, Oxford
- Website: www.louisafielden.com

Louisa Jennifer Fielden (born 20 December 1986) is a British film and television director, screenwriter and music video director.

Louisa attended Worcester College, Oxford, where she graduated with first class honours in theology. Her short film, People You May Know, premiered at the 2018 Cannes Film Festival.

== Directing ==
| Year | Title | Role |
|---|---|---|
| 2019 | War of the Worlds | Online Director |
| 2017 | Hollyoaks | Director |
| 2013–15 | Atlantis | Second Unit Director |
| 2016 | Crazyhead (TV series) | Online Director |

=== Short narrative films ===
- People You May Know (2018), director, writer, executive producer
- Patrick (2019), director, writer, executive producer
