= Len Fielden =

English footballer

Personal information
- Full name: Leonard William Fielden
- Date of birth: 22 December 1903
- Place of birth: Stockton, England
- Date of death: 25 December 1966 (aged 63)
- Place of death: Stockton, England
- Height: 5 ft 11 in (1.80 m)
- Position: Goalkeeper

Senior career*
Years	Team	Apps	(Gls)
1921–1923	South Bank		
1923–1931	Stockton		
1931–1934	Darlington	39	(0)
- * Club domestic league appearances and goals

Leonard William Fielden (22 December 1903 – 25 December 1966) was an English footballer who made 39 appearances in the Football League playing as a goalkeeper for Darlington in the 1930s. He also played non-league football for clubs including South Bank and Stockton.
