= The Quest: The Longest Drive =

- Directed by: Bernard McEveety
- Starring: Kurt Russell
- Country of origin: United States
- Original language: English

Production
- Running time: 80 minutes

Original release
- Release: 1976

The Quest: The Longest Drive is a 1976 American television film. It was originally a two-part episode of The Quest series.

== Cast ==
- Kurt Russell as Morgan Beaudine
- Tim Matheson as Quinton Beaudine
- Richard Egan as Captain Wilson
- Joaquin Garay III as Little Eagle
- Susan Dey as Charlotte Ross
- Bill Fletcher as Sergeant Yoelker
- Christopher Connelly as Corporal Callender
- Charles Lindsay Workman as Colonel Porter
