= Jonathan Fielden =

Struck off British doctor

Jonathan Mark Fielden (born 9 September 1963) was an anaesthetics and intensive care consultant. He was a former medical director of University College London Hospitals NHS Foundation Trust and former Director of Specialised Commissioning NHS England.

His first consultant post was at Royal Berkshire NHS Foundation Trust in anaesthesia and intensive care medicine. He was chairman (2006–2009) of the Central Consultants and Specialists Committee of the British Medical Association, and the secondary care specialist on the governing body of Aylesbury Vale Clinical Commissioning Group.

Fielden chaired the CQC team which assessed Hinchingbrooke Hospital ran by Circle Health Ltd (the first privately managed NHS hospital) as "inadequate" leading to the trust being put into special measures in 2014. He was appointed director of specialised commissioning at NHS England in October 2015. Subsequently, he was reckoned by the Health Service Journal to be the 49th most influential person in the English NHS in 2015.

Fielden was arrested in December 2016 on suspicion of voyeurism. He was suspended by the General Medical Council in January 2017. Fielden was convicted of this offence in June 2019 and given a suspended prison sentence. He was erased from the register - "struck off" - by the MPTS in January 2020.

== Personal life ==
Fielden's early education was at the private Bedford School in Bedford and completed his medical degree at the University of Bristol. He married Christine Mundin, head of media at the British Medical Association in 2010 and divorced in 2019.
