= Olga Fielden =

Olga Fielden (1903–1973) was a Belfast based Protestant playwright and novelist. Her 1933 novel Island Story was described in the Times Literary Supplement as having an "exhilarating quality". 1936's Stress was similarly described as "fresh and vigorous". John Wilson Foster describes Fielden's fictional world as one in which "violence, degeneration, animal desires and greed battle with the gentler aspirations to refinement, cultivation, decency." Fielden wrote a number of plays for the BBC and Three To Go was produced by the Abbey Theatre in Dublin.

== Life ==
Olga Fielden was born in 1903 in Belfast; she was one of six children born to Victor Leopold George Fielden, an anaesthetist and professor at the Queen's University Belfast, and his wife Caroline nee Grant.

Fielden was a Belfast based playwright and novelist. She was a member of PEN and the amateur dramatics society the Northern Drama League, for whom she wrote plays.

Her novel Island Story (Jonathan Cape, 1933) was described in the Times Literary Supplement as having an "exhilarating quality". Stress (Jonathan Cape, 1936) was similarly described as "fresh and vigorous". John Wilson Foster describes Fielden's fictional world as one in which "violence, degeneration, animal desires and greed battle with the gentler aspirations to refinement, cultivation, decency." She wrote a third novel, Liam Donne, which remained unpublished "due to the war". It was a fictional retelling of the story of William de Burgh, Earl of Ulster.

Fielden wrote a number of plays for the BBC and Three To Go was produced by the Abbey Theatre in Dublin in 1950.

== Legacy ==
Fielden died in 1973. Her one-act play Witches in Eden covers the real witch trials that took place in Islandmagee in the early 1700’s, and was staged at Ulster University in 2023.
