= Arthur Aston (cricketer) =

English cricketer, barrister and judge

Personal information
- Full name: Arthur Henry Southcote Aston
- Born: 4 July 1875; Poona, Bombay Presidency, British India
- Died: 30 May 1949 (aged 73); Winchester, Hampshire, England
- Batting: Unknown

Domestic team information
- Years: Team
- 1904/05: Europeans

Career statistics
| Competition | First-class |
|---|---|
| Matches | 1 |
| Runs scored | 25 |
| Batting average | – |
| 100s/50s | –/– |
| Top score | 16* |
| Catches/stumpings | 1/– |
- Source: ESPNcricinfo, 7 November 2021

Arthur Henry Southcote Aston (4 July 1875 – 30 May 1949) was an English barrister and judge in British India. He played one match as a first-class cricketer.

== Life ==
The son of Henry Faure Aston of the Indian Civil Service, and his wife Augusta Creed, Arthur was born in British India at Poona in July 1875. He was educated in England at Harrow School, before going up to Balliol College, Oxford. After graduating from Oxford, he was called to the bar in 1901 to practice as a barrister.

The following year Aston departed for British India, where he practiced as a barrister at Bombay. He was the honorary secretary of the Bombay Gymkhana in 1904 and 1905. He played cricket for the Byculla Club. His only appearance in first-class cricket was for the Europeans cricket team against the Parsees in the 1904–05 Bombay Presidency Match. He scored 16 runs (out of his team total of 48) in the first innings, and 9 (out of the team's 40) in the second and was a good enough batsman to remain not out in both low-scoring innings.

Aston spent a year in Sind as a public prosecutor and government pleader, before returning to Bombay in 1907 to take up the appointment of Chief Magistrate and Revenue Judge. In 1908 he ordered the arrest of Bal Gangadhar Tilak. In connection with the Khudiram Bose assassination attempt, Aston was singled out by W. T. Stead for criticism in 1909, for blocking the import of an issue of the London journal Swaraj that contained an article by Bipin Chandra Pal on the case.

In 1934 Aston retired. He died at Winchester, England, in May 1949. He edited the 9th edition (1921) of Matthew Henry Starling's Indian Criminal Law.

== Family ==
Aston married in 1906 at Bombay Cathedral Ada Lilian Savile, daughter of Albany Robert Savile of the 18th Regiment of Foot and his wife Sybella Twemlow. The couple had a son and a daughter.
