= Kolguyev Island =

Island in Barents Sea, Russia

Native name: о́стров Колгу́ев
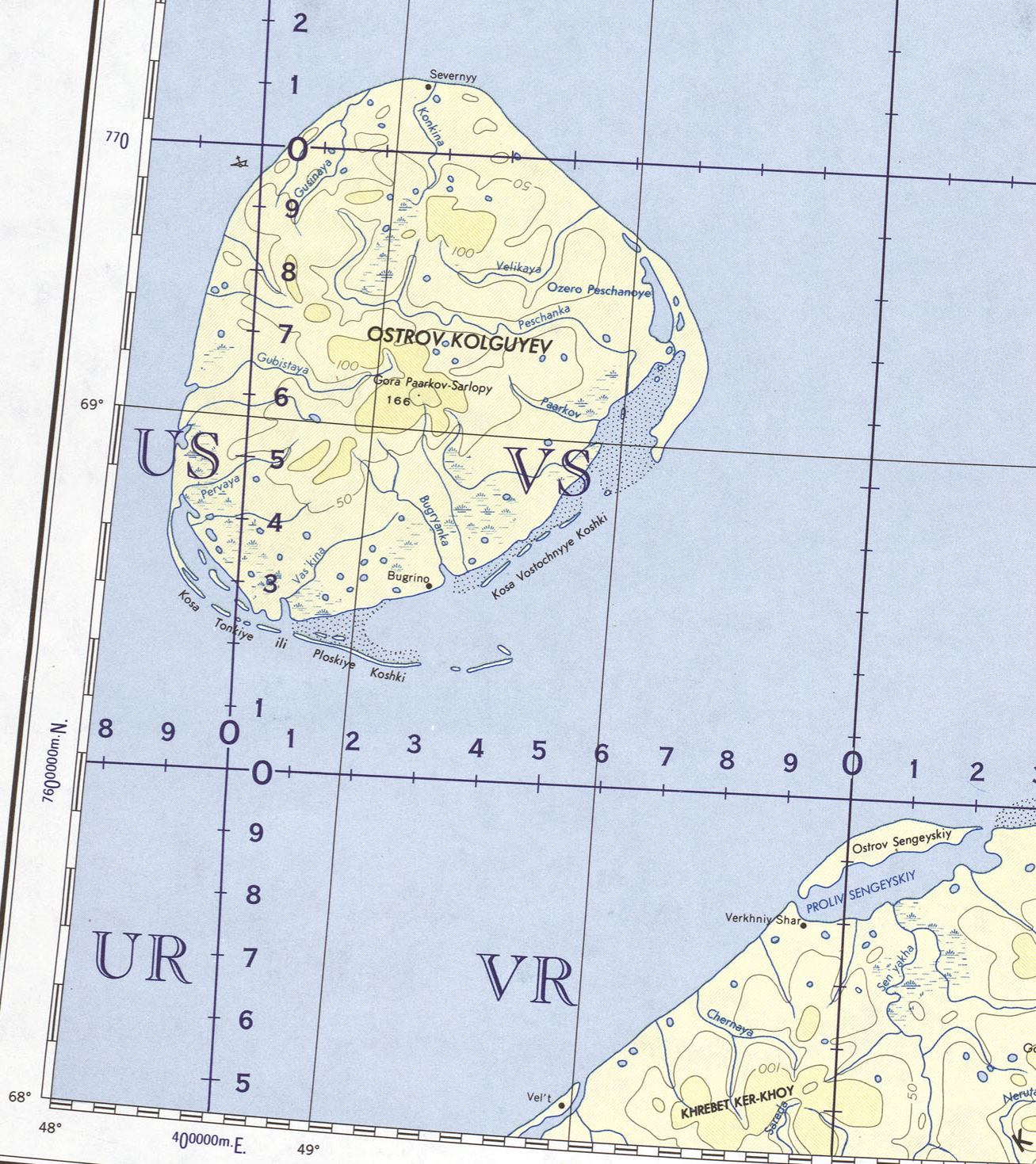
- Kolguyev Island. 1963 U.S. Army map section

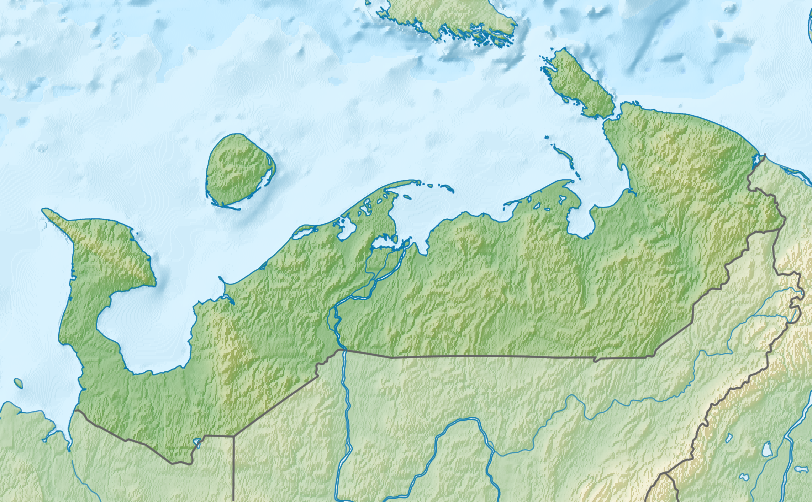
- Location within Nenets Autonomous Okrug

Geography
- Location: Arctic Sea
- Coordinates: 69°05′N 49°15′E
- Area: 3,497 km^{2} (1,350 sq mi)
- Highest elevation: 166 m (545 ft)
- Highest point: Gora Paarkov-Sarlopy

Administration
- Russia
- Oblast: Arkhangelsk Oblast
- Okrug: Nenets Autonomous Okrug
- Largest settlement: Bugrino (pop. 210)

Demographics
- Population: 413 (2021)
- Ethnic groups: Nenets, Russians, Komi

Kolguyev Island (Russian: о́стров Колгу́ев) is an island in Nenets Autonomous Okrug of Russia, located in the south-eastern Barents Sea (west of the Pechora Sea) to the north-east of the Kanin Peninsula.

== Etymology ==
There are different versions about the origin of the toponym "Kolguyev". According to one of them, the name of the island was given by the Pomors in honor of the fisherman Ivan Kalgov, who disappeared without a trace in the waters surrounding the island. According to another version, the name of the island comes from the ancient Finnic word kollague, which translates to "triangle" or "triangular".

== History ==
Kolguyev has been settled for several centuries by Nenets people, who used the island as a base for seal and reindeer hunting, as well as fishing.

The waters around the island were briefly explored by the navigator Willem Barentsz in August 1594.

In 1841, an expedition by the Russian Academy of Sciences under Franz Josef Ruprecht and Professor Saweljaw visited the island in July and August. They circumnavigated the island and briefly explored its interior, reporting on the island.

=== Report by Trevor-Battye ===
The island was explored in 1894 by the British naturalist Aubyn B. R. Trevor-Battye. He landed in June with an assistant, intending to spend about one month studying the wildlife, especially the birds. Due to mechanical problems with the vessel and a misunderstanding, they were left stranded on the island for 12 weeks. He published his study of the natural history and topography of Kolguyev as Ice-Bound on Kolguev (Trevor-Battye 1895). The book includes observations on the Nenets (whom he called Samoyed) who brought their reindeer to the island for summer grazing and to trap geese for trade in Russia. Trevor-Battye eventually left the island with these reindeer herders in September 1894, and had to travel 1,000 miles (1,600 km) overland from the Pechora River to Archangel. He described this journey in A Northern Highway of the Tsar (Trevor-Battye 1898).

== Geography and environment ==
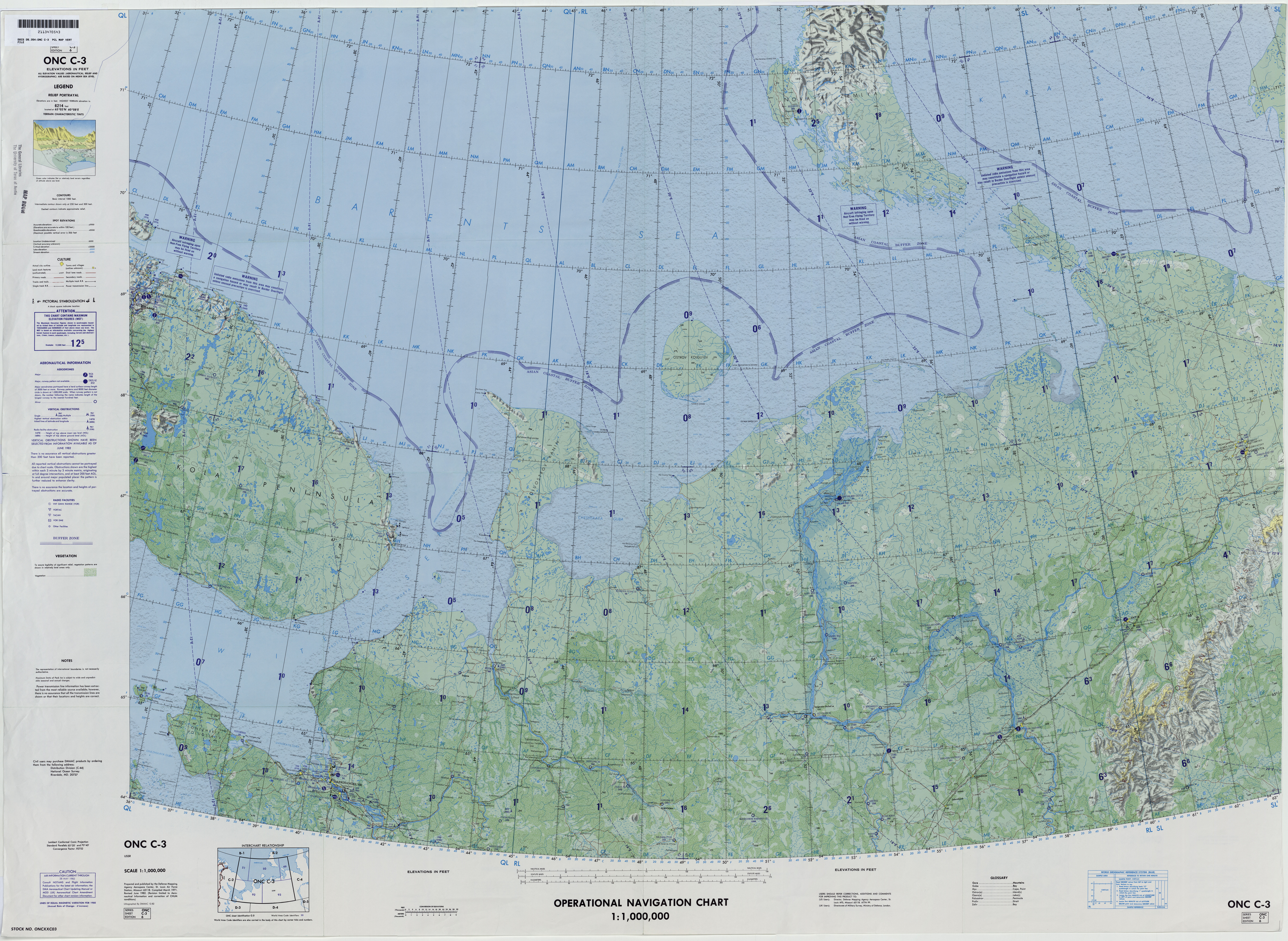
Map including Kolguyev Island

The approximately circular-shaped island has a diameter of 80 kilometres (50 mi) and is 3,497 square kilometres (1,350 sq mi) in area. The highest point on the island is at 166 m (545 feet).

There is only one inhabited settlement on the island, Bugrino, located on the southeast coast. Nenets form the majority of the population, with fishing, reindeer farming and trapping being their main economic activities. Oil and gas are also present.

=== Climate ===
Kolguyev Island has a tundra climate (Köppen ET) with an August mean of only 8.3 °C (46.9 °F). February is the coldest month, with a mean of −11.5 °C (11.3 °F). Because of its maritime location, Kolguyev Island experiences seasonal lag. Precipitation is higher in summer and autumn than in winter and spring, with the island receiving 331 millimetres (13.0 in) of precipitation in total.

- Highest temperature: 30.0 °C (86.0 °F) on July 10, 1990
- Lowest temperature: −40.1 °C (−40.2 °F) on February 16, 1951
- Warmest month: 13.0 °C (55.4 °F) in July 2016
- Coldest month: −25.3 °C (−13.5 °F) in February 1998
- Wettest year: 506 millimetres (19.9 in) in 1962
- Driest year: 101 millimetres (4.0 in) in 2017

Climate data for Kolguyev Island (1991–2020 normals, extremes 1933–present)
Month	Jan	Feb	Mar	Apr	May	Jun	Jul	Aug	Sep	Oct	Nov	Dec	Year
Record high °C (°F)	2.3 (36.1)	2.2 (36.0)	2.3 (36.1)	8.7 (47.7)	22.1 (71.8)	27.4 (81.3)	30.0 (86.0)	29.2 (84.6)	22.1 (71.8)	12.0 (53.6)	5.8 (42.4)	4.4 (39.9)	30.0 (86.0)
Mean daily maximum °C (°F)	−7.7 (18.1)	−8.7 (16.3)	−6.7 (19.9)	−3.1 (26.4)	1.1 (34.0)	6.7 (44.1)	11.6 (52.9)	10.8 (51.4)	8.0 (46.4)	2.6 (36.7)	−1.7 (28.9)	−4.1 (24.6)	0.7 (33.3)
Daily mean °C (°F)	−10.5 (13.1)	−11.5 (11.3)	−9.5 (14.9)	−5.5 (22.1)	−1.1 (30.0)	3.8 (38.8)	8.3 (46.9)	8.3 (46.9)	5.8 (42.4)	0.9 (33.6)	−3.8 (25.2)	−6.5 (20.3)	−1.8 (28.8)
Mean daily minimum °C (°F)	−13.7 (7.3)	−14.9 (5.2)	−12.6 (9.3)	−8.3 (17.1)	−3.0 (26.6)	1.8 (35.2)	5.8 (42.4)	6.0 (42.8)	3.7 (38.7)	−1.3 (29.7)	−6.5 (20.3)	−9.4 (15.1)	−4.4 (24.1)
Record low °C (°F)	−37.6 (−35.7)	−40.1 (−40.2)	−36.0 (−32.8)	−31.6 (−24.9)	−22.5 (−8.5)	−6.2 (20.8)	−2.4 (27.7)	−2.9 (26.8)	−6.3 (20.7)	−21.2 (−6.2)	−27.5 (−17.5)	−35.5 (−31.9)	−40.1 (−40.2)
Average precipitation mm (inches)	22 (0.9)	18 (0.7)	17 (0.7)	16 (0.6)	16 (0.6)	32 (1.3)	31 (1.2)	38 (1.5)	41 (1.6)	45 (1.8)	26 (1.0)	29 (1.1)	331 (13)
Source: Погода и Климат

=== Flora and fauna ===
The island contains many bogs and morainic hills, covered by tundra vegetation. A proposed subspecies of candle larkspur, Delphinium elatum ssp. cryophilum, is found only on this island, but its distinctness from the mainland population is disputed.

The island regularly supports significant populations of barnacle and greater white-fronted geese. It has been recognised as an Important Bird Area (IBA) by BirdLife International.

Fossils of temnospondyl amphibian Wetlugasaurus malachovi were found in the Lower Triassic (Lower Olenekian) deposits near borehole Peschanoozerskaya 35 on this island.

== Economy ==
The main occupations of the population of the village of Bugrino are reindeer husbandry and fishing. Bugrino is the base of the Kolguyevsky industrial complex. In 2013–2014, due to the lack of sufficient food on Kolguyev Island, there was a massive die-off of deer. The livestock decreased from 12,000 to 200–400 heads (according to other sources, up to 50 heads). Four workers remained in the reindeer herding state farm. There are interruptions in the supply of the population.

ArktikNeft is, along with OAO Arktikmorneftegazrazvedka, which specializes in oil exploration, the only continental company that has received a license to operate on the island. Exploration of the island began in 1980. In 1983, the Peschanoozerskoye oil field was discovered.

To date, only oil fields are being exploited. Gas extraction requires the construction of new infrastructure. ArcticNeft conducts all exploration, drilling, extraction, storage and transportation of crude oil. The deposits on the island are of excellent quality, with a very low sulfur content. There are 52 wells in operation (as of November 2002), which extract about 100,000 tons of oil per year.

The transportation of crude oil on the island between different extraction, processing and storage sites is carried out via an oil pipeline. Exports are carried out by sea in summer and autumn: tankers with an average capacity of 30,000 tons are loaded directly into the sea, 5,000 meters from the coast using a floating oil pipeline (siphon). All oil is exported to Rotterdam.

The workforce consists of oil and driller teams, two well service teams, transport personnel and administrative staff. The operation is carried out by two teams of 150 people each, which change every 52 days. The transportation of people and equipment from the island to the continent and back was carried out until the end of 2002 in winter by a helicopter connecting Arkhangelsk, Murmansk or Naryan-Mar with Kolguyev, and in summer and autumn by a steamer plying between Murmansk and the island. Since November 2002, ArcticNeft has had a runway capable of receiving medium-sized aircraft (Yak-40, An-24 and An-26), which the company uses mainly for its own needs, but also for the needs of the rest of the island's population, in particular, residents of the village of Bugrino.

== Images ==
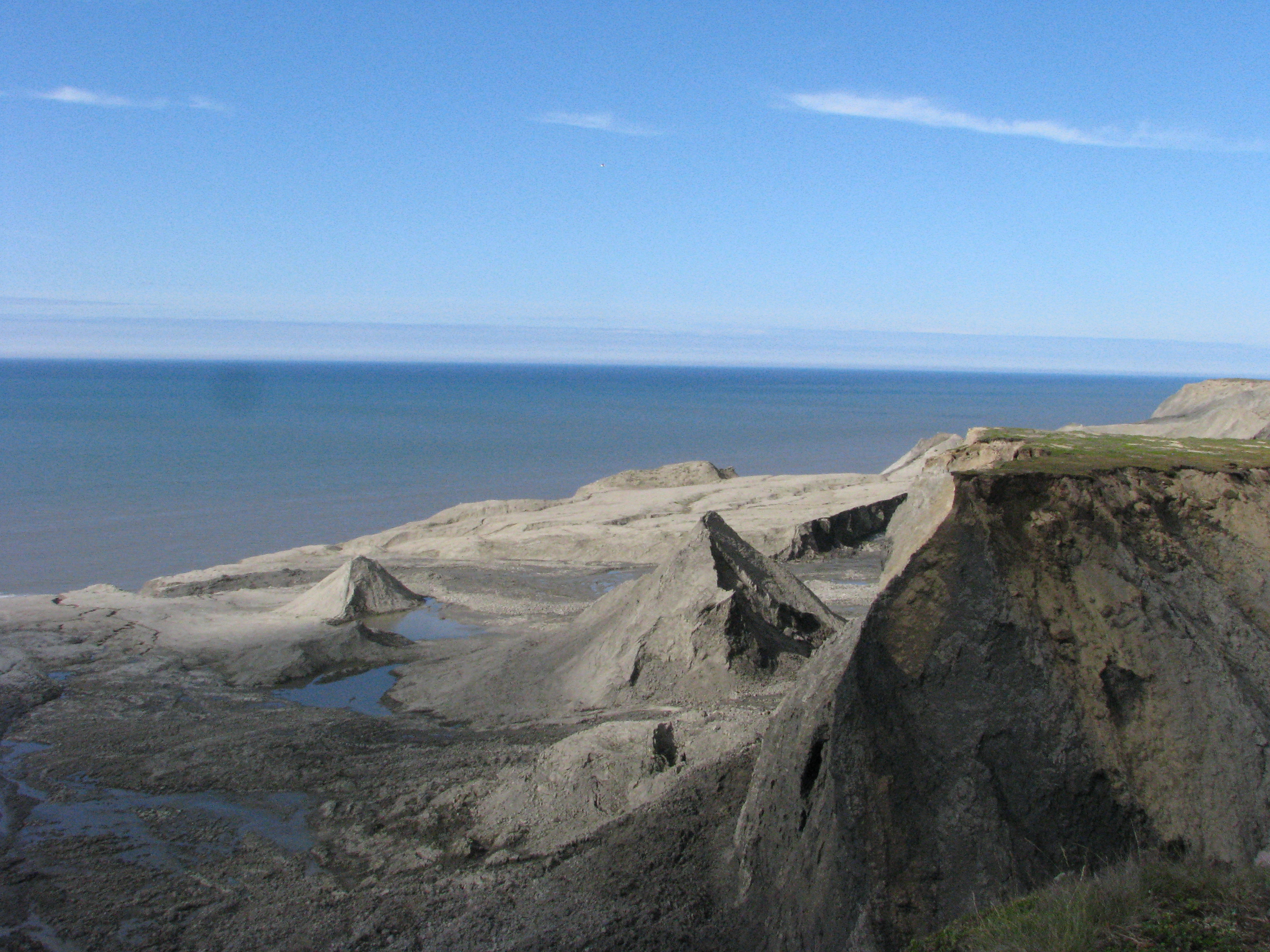
Coastal landscape of Kolguyev Island.

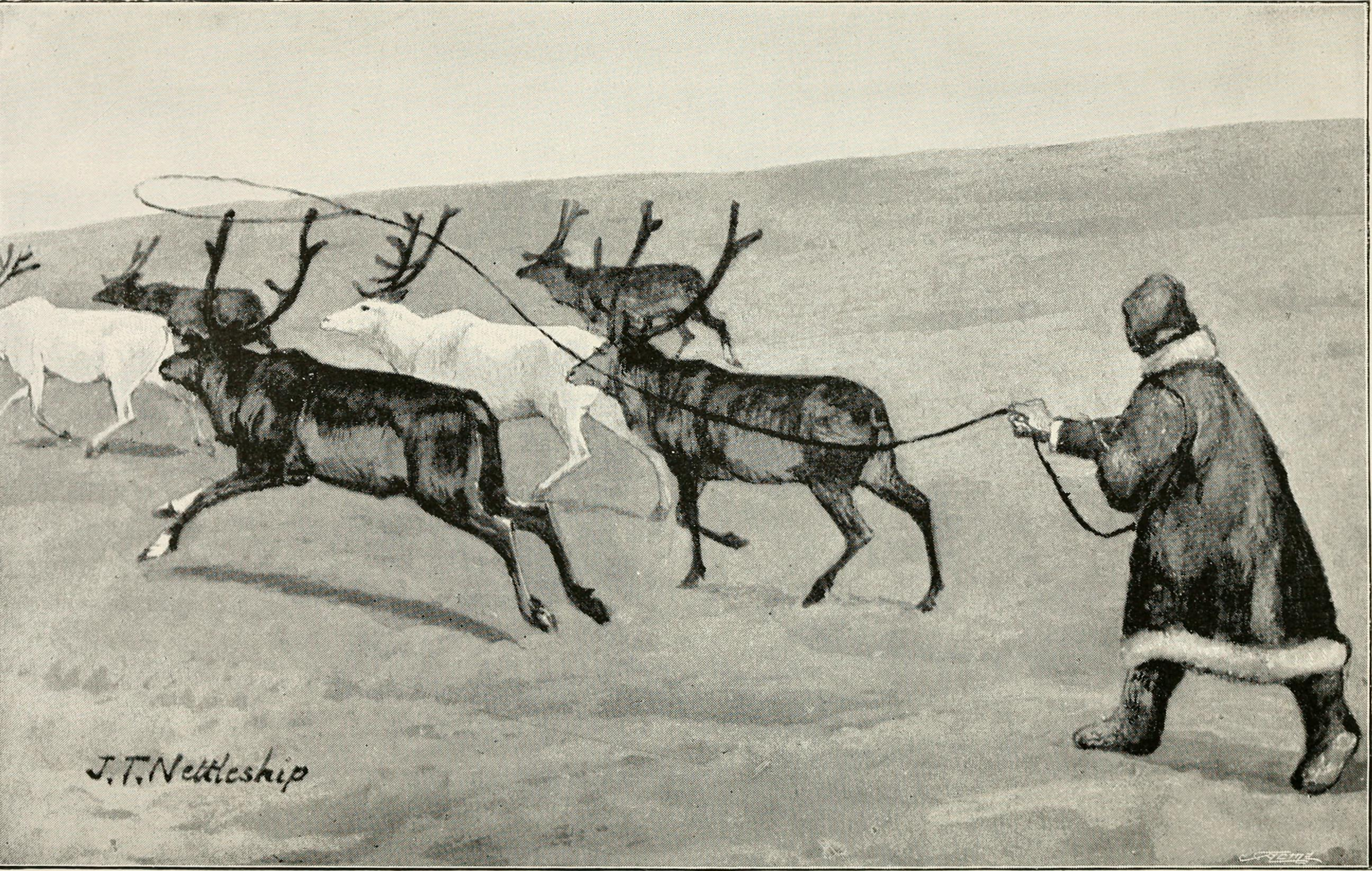
Drawing of a reindeer herd in Kolguyev Island in 1895.
