= Feilden baronets =

UK Baronetage title

- Escutcheon of the Feilden baronets of Feniscowles
- Creation date: 1846
- Status: extant
- Motto: Virtutis præmium honor, Honor is the reward of virtue

The Feilden Baronetcy, of Feniscowles in the County Palatine of Lancaster, is a title in the Baronetage of the United Kingdom. It was created on 21 July 1846 for William Feilden, Member of Parliament for Blackburn between 1832 and 1847. He sat as a Liberal from 1832 to 1841 then as a Conservative from then until 1847.

== Feilden baronets, of Feniscowles (1846) ==
- Sir William Feilden, 1st Baronet (1772–1850)
- Sir William Henry Feilden, 2nd Baronet (1812–1879)
- Sir William Leyland Feilden, 3rd Baronet (1835–1912)
- Sir William Henry Feilden, 4th Baronet (1866–1946)
- Sir William Morton Buller Feilden, MC, 5th Baronet (1893–1976)
- Sir Henry Wemyss Feilden, 6th Baronet (1916–2010)
- Sir Henry Rudyard Feilden, 7th Baronet, BVSc, MRCVS (1951–2024)
- Sir William Henry Feilden, 8th Baronet (born 1983)

The heir presumptive is the 8th Baronet's half-brother, James Edward Henry Feilden (born 2000).

== Extended family ==
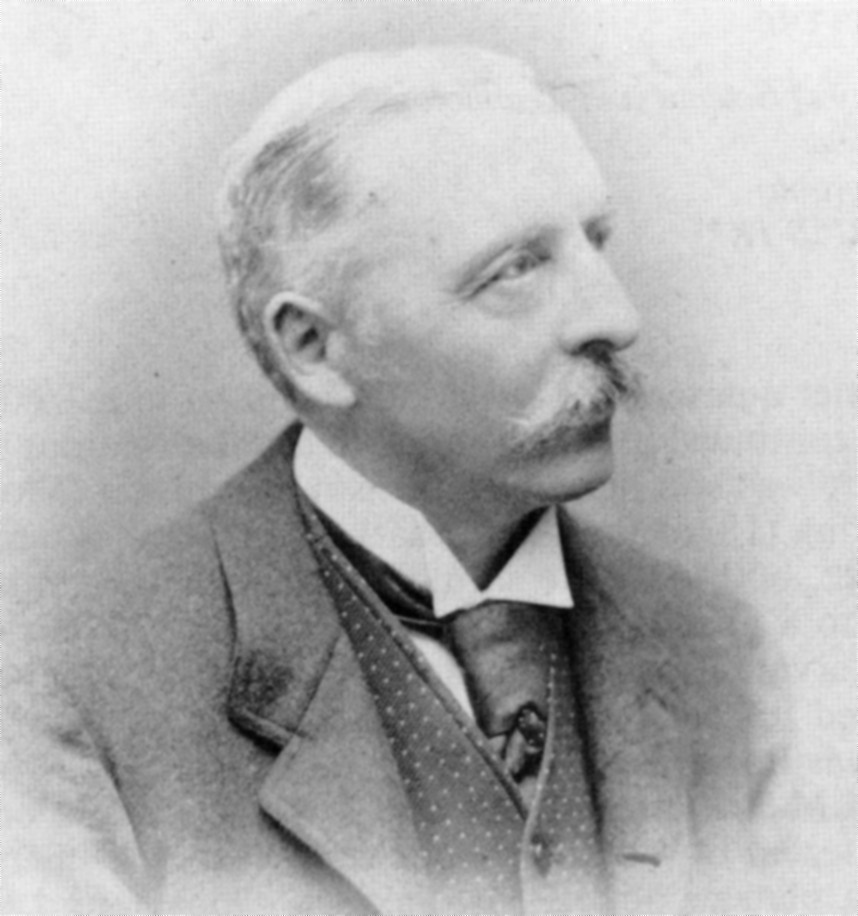
The Arctic explorer Henry Wemyss Feilden, second son of Sir William Henry Feilden, 2nd Baronet

Henry Wemyss Feilden, second son of the second Baronet, was an Arctic explorer.
