= Crown servant =

State employee in the UK and Commonwealth

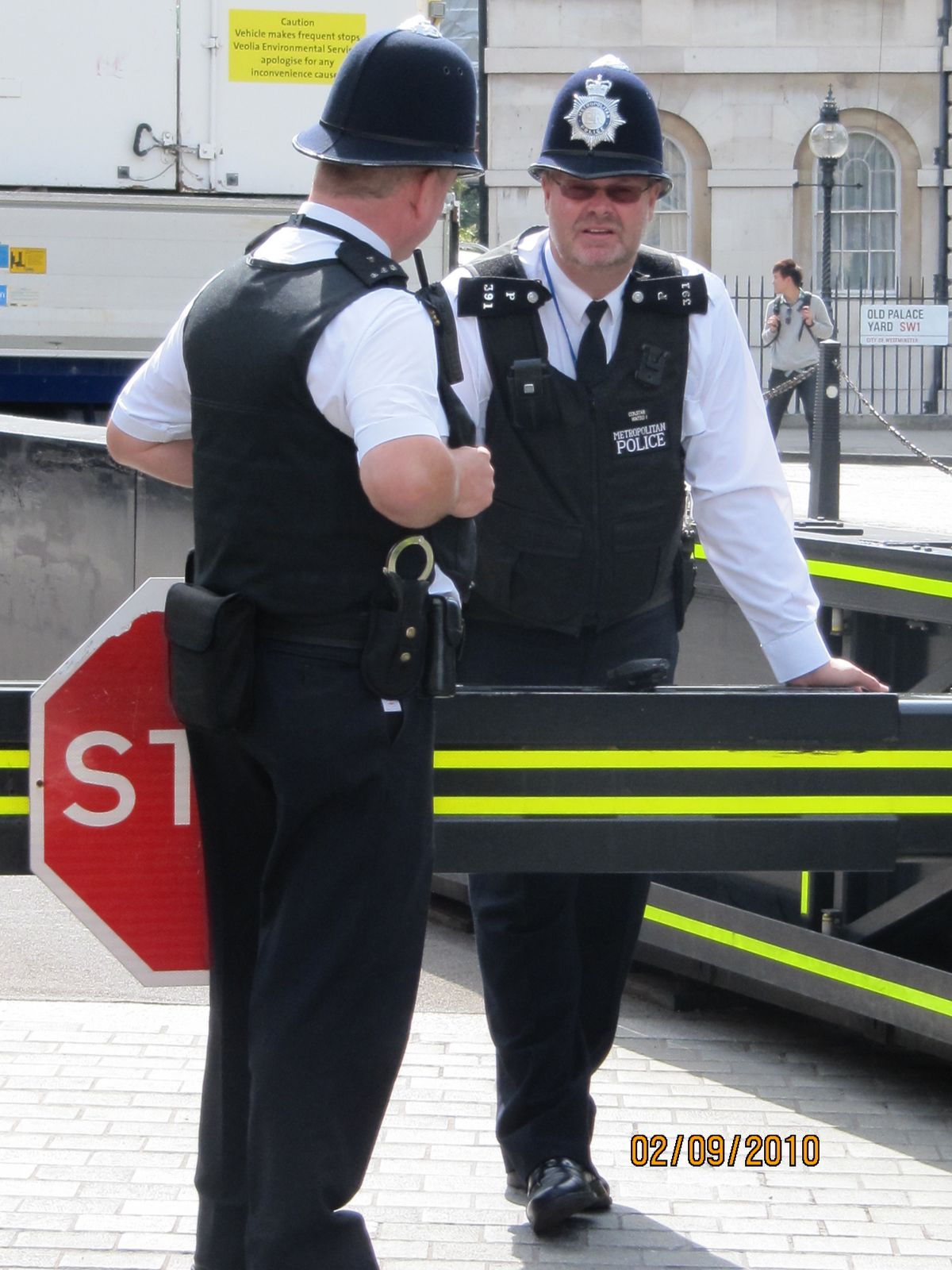
Police officers in London

In the United Kingdom and other Commonwealth countries such as Canada, a crown servant is a "person employed by the Crown". Although the term is not consistently defined, generally all executive officials and their staffs, civil servants, police officers, judicial officials, and members of the armed forces are crown servants.

== Crown servant vs civil servant ==
There is no meaningful legal definition of a civil servant. The Constitutional Reform and Governance Act 2010 following the Tomlin Commission on the Civil Service unhelpfully refers to "the civil service of the State".

— John Alder, Constitutional and Administrative Law

The terms civil servant and Crown servant can coincide but are sometimes exclusive. It is suggested that the phrase "civil servant" may include every person who serves the Crown, with the exception of members of the armed forces of the United Kingdom, the Ministers of the Crown and the judiciaries of the United Kingdom. However, members of the armed forces are nonetheless Crown servants.

Generally in Canada, unless specifically defined otherwise within a specific act, public servant refers to those working for "departments named in Schedule I to the Financial Administration Act, Canada and the other portions of the federal public administration named in Schedules II to V to that Act", and "does not include the Canadian Forces".

== Employment rights ==
Crown servants serve "at the pleasure of the Crown", and do not therefore benefit from the protections normally available to employees by law. However, the majority of these protections are applied to them by section 273 of the Trade Union and Labour Relations (Consolidation) Act 1992. For the purposes of the Act, "crown employment" means employment "under or for the purposes of a government department or any officer or body exercising on behalf of the Crown functions conferred by an enactment", though members of the armed forces are excluded from this provision, and the government has the ability to exclude other Crown servants "for the purpose of safeguarding national security".

== Official Secrets Act 1989 ==
Section 12(1) of the Official Secrets Act 1989 defines the expression "Crown servant" for the purposes of that Act. It now provides:

In this Act "Crown servant" means -

(a) a Minister of the Crown;
[(aa) a member of the Scottish Executive or a junior Scottish Minister;]
[(ab) the First Minister for Wales, a Welsh Minister appointed under section 48 of the Government of Wales Act 2006, the Counsel General to the Welsh Assembly Government or a Deputy Welsh Minister;]
(b) . . .
(c) any person employed in the civil service of the Crown, including His Majesty's Diplomatic Service, His Majesty's Overseas Civil Service, the Northern Ireland Civil Service and the Northern Ireland Court Service;
(d) any member of the naval, military or air forces of the Crown, including any person employed by an association established for the purposes of [Part XI of the Reserve Forces Act 1996];
(e) any constable and any other person employed or appointed in or for the purposes of any police force [(including the Police Service of Northern Ireland and the Police Service of Northern Ireland Reserve)] [or of the Serious Organised Crime Agency];
(f) any person who is a member or employee of a prescribed body or a body of a prescribed class and either is prescribed for the purposes of this paragraph or belongs to a prescribed class of members or employees of any such body;
(g) any person who is the holder of a prescribed office or who is an employee of such a holder and either is prescribed for the purposes of this paragraph or belongs to a prescribed class of such employees.

Prescribed classes of employees or members of prescribed bodies or classes of bodies, s. 12(1)(f)

The following have been prescribed for the purposes of section 12(1)(f):

- The employees of British Nuclear Fuels plc
- The members of the Board of that Company
- The members, officers and employees of the United Kingdom Atomic Energy Authority
- The employees of Urenco Limited
- The members of the Board of that Company.
- The employees of Urenco (Capenhurst) Limited
- The members of the Board of that Company
- The employees of Enrichment Technology Company Limited
- The members of the Board of that Company
- The employees of Enrichment Technology UK Limited
- The members of the Board of that Company
- The employees of Urenco Enrichment Company Limited
- The members of the Board of that Company
- The members and employees the Nuclear Decommissioning Authority
- The employees of any subsidiary of the Nuclear Decommissioning Authority. For this purpose, "subsidiary" has the same meaning as in the Companies Act 1985.
- The members of the Board of any subsidiary of the Nuclear Decommissioning Authority. Again, "subsidiary" has the same meaning.
- The members and employees of the Independent Police Complaints Commission.

Prescribed offices, s.12(1)(g)

The following offices are now prescribed for the purposes of section 12(1)(g):

- Comptroller and Auditor General
- Member of staff of the National Audit Office
- Comptroller and Auditor General for Northern Ireland
- Member of staff of the Northern Ireland Audit Office
- Auditor General for Scotland
- Parliamentary Commissioner for Administration
- The Scottish Parliamentary Commissioner for Administration
- Northern Ireland Parliamentary Commissioner for Administration
- Scottish Public Services Ombudsman
- A private secretary to the Sovereign

Prescribed classes of employees of holders of prescribed offices, s. 12(1)(g)

The following classes of employees of holders of the prescribed offices above are now prescribed for the purposes of section 12(1)(g):

- The officers of the Parliamentary Commissioner for Administration who are not otherwise Crown servants
- Officer of the Health Service Commissioner for England being an officer who is authorised by the Parliamentary Commissioner for Administration to perform any of his functions and who is not otherwise a Crown servant
- The staff of the Scottish Parliamentary Commissioner for Administration who are not otherwise Crown servants
- The officers of the Northern Ireland Parliamentary Commissioner for Administration who are not otherwise Crown servants
- The officers of the Scottish Public Services Ombudsman who are not otherwise Crown servants

== See also ==
- Civil Service
- Crown act of state
