= Robert Black (auditor) =

First Auditor General for Scotland

Robert William Black CBE FRSE FRSS FRSA

Auditor General for Scotland
- In office February 2000 – June 2012
- Monarch: Queen Elizabeth II
- First Minister: Donald Dewar MSP (2000); Henry McLeish MSP (2000 to 2001); Jack McConnell MSP (2001 to 2007); Alex Salmond MSP (2007 to 2014)
- Preceded by: Inaugural holder
- Succeeded by: Caroline Gardner

Personal details
- Born: 6 November 1946 Banff, Aberdeenshire, Scotland
- Died: 15 October 2021 (aged 74) Dunblane, Scotland
- Education: University of Aberdeen

Robert William Black CBE FRSE FRSS FRSA (6 November 1946 – 15 October 2021) was a Scottish public administrator who was the first Auditor General for Scotland, holding the post between 2000 and 2012. He had several Local Authority management roles before being appointed as Auditor General. As Auditor General he coordinated the scrutiny of public finances over several administrations. After retiring from the role of Auditor General he held multiple board positions and chaired several independent commissions that carried out independent reviews on issues such as housing policy and policing.

== Early life and education ==
Black was born in Banff, Aberdeenshire. He was educated at Robert Gordon's College. He studied at the University of Aberdeen, graduating with an honours MA degree in economics, then gained a MSc degree in town planning from Heriot-Watt University, and a master's degree in public policy from University of Strathclyde.

== Career ==
=== Local Authority management ===
Black was a local authority chief executive for 10 years, first with Stirling District Council 1985−90, then with Tayside Regional Council 1990−95.

=== Auditor General ===
Black became Controller of Audit with the Accounts Commission in 1995, and was the first person to hold the position who was not an accountant. In May 1999, the Scottish Parliament voted to nominate a person to become the first Auditor General for Scotland. Parliament's choice was approved by the Queen, and Black was appointed to the post in February 2000. He was also the chief executive of Audit Scotland. In October 2011 he announced that he would retire from Audit Scotland. In March 2012, the Scottish Parliament decided that Caroline Gardner should succeed him.

=== Board and Commission appointments ===
Black began a three-year term on the Council of the Institute of Chartered Accountants of Scotland (ICAS) in March 2012.

In June 2012, Black was appointed to the board of the British Library for a four-year term. He was re-appointed for a second term in 2016, and chaired the public audit committee.

In 2012 he gave a lecture at the David Hume Institute, where he questioned the sustainability of public services if provision continued free at the current level. Black had proposed that a Scottish Commission for Resources and Performance be established, modelled on the Australian Government's Productivity Commission. This was not progressed by the Government.

In 2013, Black was announced as chair of the independent Commission on Housing and Wellbeing, bringing together eight members from a variety of organisations, with the aim of improving Scotland's wellbeing through better housing. The Commission reported in 2015 making eighteen recommendations.

Black was a member of the University Court at the University of Edinburgh. He was a lay member of the University Court at the University of Stirling from 2019.

Black was asked by Scottish Government to respond to Her Majesty's Inspectorate of Constabulary in Scotland (HMICS) Thematic Inspection of the SPA's recommendation to review the roles of its chair and members in executive work. Black reported in August 2020 that the SPA's governance and accountability arrangements were neither flawed nor in need of reorganisation. In March 2021, Black was appointed to the board of the Scottish Police Authority (SPA).

He chaired the board of trustees at the economic think tank Fiscal Affairs Scotland. Set up in 2014, it closed in 2017 after failing to attract financial support.

In 2006 he was elected a Fellow of the Royal Society of Edinburgh. He was a Fellow of the Royal Statistical Society.

Black died at his home in Dunblane on 15 October 2021, at the age of 74. A memorial service is to be held at Dunblane Cathedral on 1 November 2021.

== Honours and awards ==
Black received an Honorary Doctor of Law degree from the University of Aberdeen in 2004, then an Honorary Doctorate of Business Administration from Queen Margaret University in 2006. He was an Honorary Member of the Chartered Institute of Public Finance and Accountancy.

Black received a CBE in the 2012 New Year Honours.

In 2017, Black became honorary vice-president of the housing and homelessness charity Shelter Scotland, only the second person in the charity's fifty-year history to be honoured in this way.
