= Caroline Gardner =

Auditor General for Scotland

Caroline Gardner CBE CPFA FRSE

Auditor General for Scotland
- In office July 2012 – 2020
- Monarch: Queen Elizabeth II
- Preceded by: Robert Black
- First Minister: Alex Salmond (2011–2014)
- First Minister: Nicola Sturgeon (2014–present)

Personal details
- Profession: Accountant

Caroline Jane Gardner CBE CPFA FRSE was the Auditor General for Scotland between June 2012 and July 2020. She is a former president of Chartered Institute of Public Finance and Accountancy (CIPFA) 2006−7.

== Career ==
Gardiner is originally from London. She studied for her CIPFA exams while working as a trainee accountant at the Wolverhampton Borough council. She moved to Edinburgh in 1995, taking up the post of director of health and social work studies at the Accounts Commission. When Audit Scotland was created in 2000, she became the deputy auditor general.

She was a member of the CIPFA Council since 2000. She was the chair of CIPFA in Scotland in 2001−2002. She became CIPFA's 116th president, from June 2006 to June 2007.

She was seconded as the chief financial officer of the Turks and Caicos Islands in 2010. After this she spent a short period freelancing.

In March 2012, the Scottish Parliament decided that Caroline Gardner should succeed Robert Black. In July she took up the position of Auditor General, and Accountable Officer for Audit Scotland. She was in office at the onset of the United Kingdom government austerity programme, where there was a reduction in public services to repay debt incurred after the 2008 financial crisis. She was succeed in the role by Stephen Boyle in July 2020.

In March 2024 she was appointed by the University of Glasgow as Honorary Professor at the Centre for Public Policy.

== Honours ==
In March 2016, Gardner was elected a Fellow of the Royal Society of Edinburgh, Scotland's National Academy for science and letters.

She was appointed Commander of the Order of the British Empire (CBE) in the 2021 New Year Honours for services to the Scottish public sector.
