= Royal prerogative in the United Kingdom =

Privileges and immunities of the British monarch

The royal prerogative is a body of customary authority, privilege, and immunity attached to the British monarch (or "sovereign"), recognised in the United Kingdom. The monarch is regarded internally as the absolute authority, or "sole prerogative", and the source of many of the executive powers of the British government.

Prerogative powers were formerly exercised by the monarch acting on their own initiative. Since the 19th century, by convention, the advice of the prime minister or the cabinet—who are then accountable to Parliament for the decision—has been required in order for the prerogative to be exercised. The monarch remains constitutionally empowered to exercise the royal prerogative against the advice of the prime minister or the cabinet, but in practice would likely only do so in emergencies or where existing precedent does not adequately apply to the circumstances in question.

Today, the royal prerogative is available in the conduct of the government of the United Kingdom, including foreign affairs, defence, and national security. The monarch has a significant constitutional weight in these and other matters, but limited freedom to act, because the exercise of the prerogative is conventionally in the hands of the prime minister and other ministers or other government officials.

== Definition ==
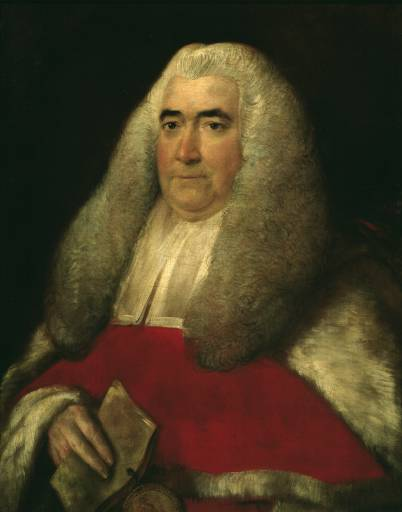
William Blackstone, who maintained that the royal prerogative was any power that could be exercised by only the monarch

The royal prerogative has been called "a notoriously difficult concept to define adequately", but whether a particular type of prerogative power exists is a matter of common law to be decided by the courts as the final arbiter. A prominent constitutional theorist, A. V. Dicey, proposed in the nineteenth century that:

The prerogative appears to be historically and as a matter of fact nothing else than the residue of discretionary or arbitrary authority which at any given time is legally left in the hands of the crown. The prerogative is the name of the remaining portion of the Crown's original authority ... Every act which the executive government can lawfully do without the authority of an Act of Parliament is done in virtue of the prerogative.

While many commentators follow the Diceyan view, there are constitutional lawyers who prefer the definition given by William Blackstone in the 1760s:

By the word prerogative we usually understand that special pre-eminence which the King hath, over and above all other persons, and out of the ordinary course of common law, in right of his regal dignity ... it can only be applied to those rights and capacities which the King enjoys alone, in contradiction to others, and not to those which he enjoys in common with any of his subjects.

Dicey's opinion that any action of governance by the monarch beyond statute is under the prerogative diverges from Blackstone's that the prerogative simply covers those actions that no other person or body in the United Kingdom can undertake, such as declaration of war. Case law exists to support both views. Blackstone's notion of the prerogative being the powers of an exclusive nature was favoured by Lord Parmoor in the De Keyser's Royal Hotel case of 1920, but some difficulty with it was expressed by Lord Reid in the Burmah Oil case of 1965. A clear distinction has not been necessary in the relevant cases, and the courts may never need to settle the question as few cases deal directly with the prerogative itself.

== History ==
Prior to the 13th century, the English monarch exercised supreme power, which was checked by "the recrudescence of feudal turbulence in the fourteenth and fifteenth centuries". The royal prerogative was a way to exercise his power without the consent of others but its limits were unclear and an attempt to legally define its scope was first made in 1387 by Richard II.

This "turbulence" began to recede over the course of the 16th century and the monarch became truly independent when Henry VIII and his successors became head of a Protestant Church of England, and therefore answerable neither to the clergy nor the Pope. Although the monarch was "the predominant partner in the English constitution", the courts recognised the growing importance of Parliament by stopping short of declaring him all-powerful. In Ferrers' Case, Henry accepted this restriction, believing he was far more powerful ruling with the consent of Parliament than without, especially in the matter of taxation. Sir Thomas Smith and other contemporary writers argued the monarch could not levy taxes without parliamentary approval.

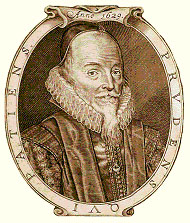
Sir Edward Coke (1552–1634); considered the leading jurist of his time, his rulings helped define the limits of the prerogative

Henry and his descendants normally followed legal decisions, even though in theory they were not bound by them. One suggestion is they recognised stable government required legal advice and consent, while "all the leading lawyers, statesmen and publicists of the Tudor period" agreed everyone was subject to the law, including the king. Although possessing "unfettered discretion" in when to use the prerogative, the monarch was limited in areas where the courts had imposed conditions on its use or where he had chosen to do so himself.

James I of England challenged this consensus in the 1607 Case of Prohibitions, arguing the king had a divine right to sit as a judge and interpret the common law as he saw fit. Led by Sir Edward Coke, the judiciary rejected this idea on the grounds that while not subject to any individual, the monarch was subject to the law. Until he had gained sufficient knowledge of the law, he had no right to interpret it which Coke also pointed out "requires long study and experience, before that a man can attain to the cognisance of it". In the 1611 Case of Proclamations, Coke further ruled the monarch could only exercise existing prerogatives, not create new ones.

After the Glorious Revolution in November 1688, James II of England was replaced by his eldest daughter Mary II and her husband William III, who accepted the throne under conditions set out in the Bill of Rights 1689. These included limits to the royal prerogative, which many felt had been misused by James; Article 1 prevented the monarch suspending or executing laws without consent of Parliament, while Article 4 made it illegal to use the prerogative to levy taxes "without grant of Parliament". The Bill also allowed Parliament to limit the use of remaining prerogatives in future, one example being the Triennial Act 1694, which required the monarch to dismiss and call Parliament at certain times.

== Prerogative powers ==
=== Legislature ===
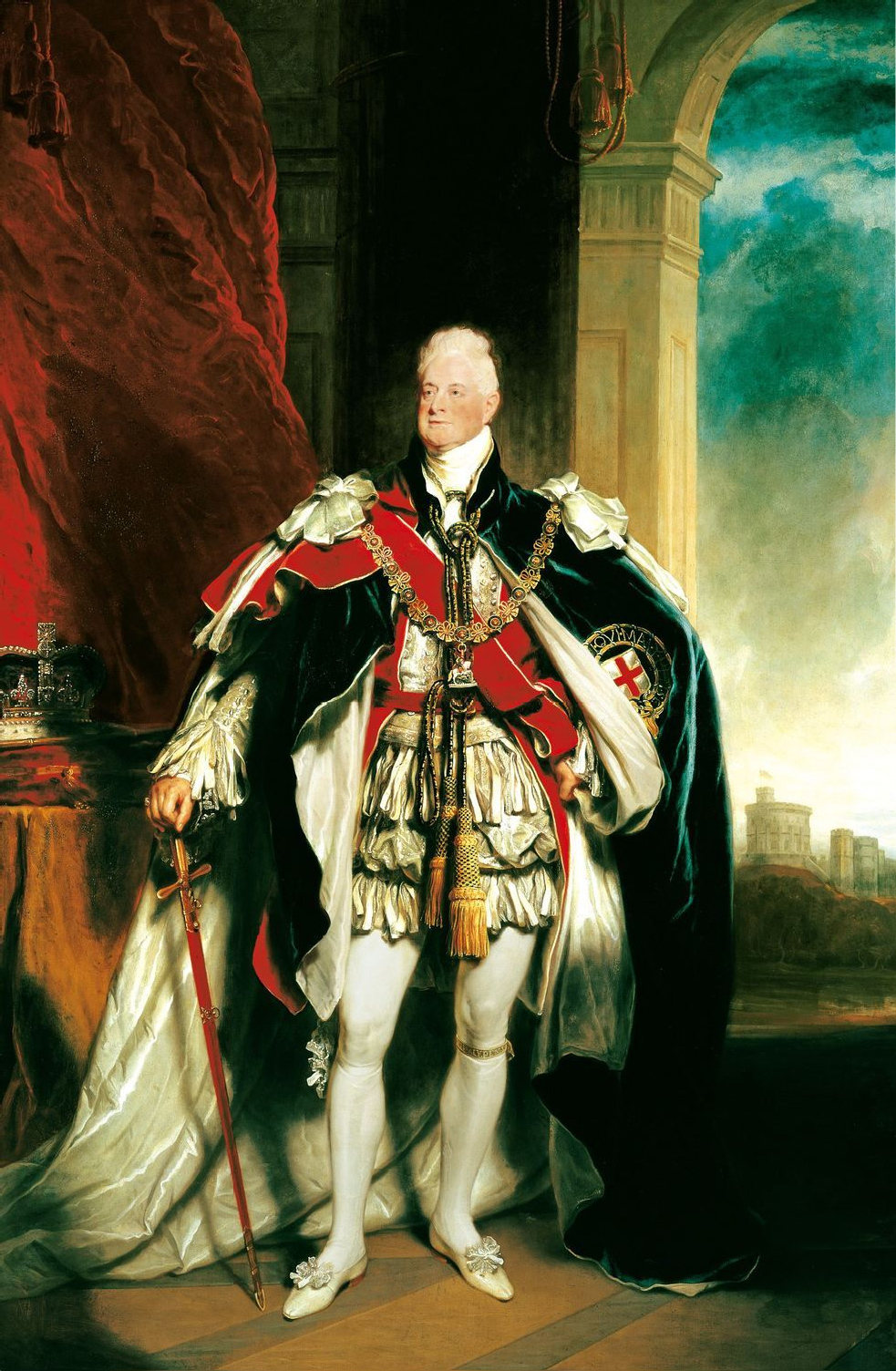
William IV, the last monarch to arbitrarily dissolve Parliament by using the royal prerogative

The power to dissolve parliament is "perhaps the most important residual prerogative exercised personally by the sovereign, and represents the greatest potential for controversy." This prerogative is normally exercised at the request of the prime minister, either at his or her discretion or following a motion of no confidence. Constitutional theorists have had differing views as to whether a unilateral dissolution of Parliament would be possible today; Sir Ivor Jennings wrote that a dissolution involves "the acquiescence of ministers", and as such the monarch could not dissolve Parliament without ministerial consent; "if ministers refuse to give such advice, she can do no more than dismiss them." A. V. Dicey, however, believed that in certain extreme circumstances the monarch could dissolve Parliament single-handedly, on the condition that "an occasion has arisen on which there is fair reason to suppose that the opinion of the House is not the opinion of the electors ... A dissolution is allowable, or necessary, whenever the wishes of the legislature are, or may fairly be presumed to be, different from the wishes of the nation."

The monarch could force the dissolution of Parliament through a refusal of royal assent; this would very likely lead to a government resigning. By convention, the monarch always assents to bills; the last time royal assent was not given was in 1708 during the reign of Queen Anne when, on ministerial advice, she withheld royal assent from the Scottish Militia Bill. This does not mean that the right to refuse, even contrary to the wishes of the Prime Minister, has died: the threat of a royal veto by George III and George IV made Catholic Emancipation impossible between 1800 and 1829, whilst George V had been privately advised (by his own lawyer, not by the Prime Minister) that he could veto the Third Irish Home Rule Bill; Jennings writes that "it was assumed by the King throughout that he had not only the legal power but the constitutional right to refuse assent". The royal prerogative to dissolve Parliament was abrogated by section 3(2) of the Fixed-term Parliaments Act 2011, and revived by the Dissolution and Calling of Parliament Act 2022, which repealed the 2011 act as if it "had never been enacted". Section 6(1) of the 2011 act however specifically stated that the monarch's power to prorogue Parliament is not affected by the act. Nonetheless, the Supreme Court's 2019 judgment in Miller II established that the prerogative of prorogation is not absolute.

The appointment of the prime minister is also, theoretically, governed by the royal prerogative. Technically the monarch may appoint as prime minister anyone he wants to appoint, but in practice the appointee is always the person who is best placed to command a majority in the House of Commons. Usually, this is the leader of the political party that is returned to Parliament with a majority of seats after a general election. Difficulties may result with a so-called hung parliament, in which no party commands majority support, as last occurred in 2017. In this situation, constitutional convention is that the previous incumbent has the first right to form a coalition government and seek appointment. If the prime minister decides to retire in the middle of a parliamentary session, then unless there is a clear "prime minister-in-waiting" (e.g., Neville Chamberlain in 1937 or Anthony Eden in 1955) the monarch in principle has to choose a successor (after taking appropriate advice, not necessarily from the outgoing prime minister), but the last monarch to be actively involved in such a process was George V, who appointed Stanley Baldwin rather than Lord Curzon in 1923. In more modern times, the monarch left it to the politicians involved to choose a successor through private consultations (Winston Churchill in May 1940, Harold Macmillan in January 1957, Alec Douglas-Home in October 1963). Nowadays, the monarch has no discretion, as the governing party will elect a new leader who will near-automatically be appointed as he or she commands the support of the majority of the Commons (most recently Theresa May in 2016, Boris Johnson in 2019, Liz Truss and Rishi Sunak in 2022, and Andy Burnham in 2026).

=== Judicial system ===
The most noted prerogative power that affects the judicial system is the prerogative of mercy, which has two elements: the granting of pardons and the granting of nolle prosequi. Pardons may eliminate the "pains, penalties and punishments" from a criminal conviction, though they do not remove convictions themselves. This power is commonly exercised on the advice of the Secretary of State for the Home Department; the monarch has no direct involvement in its use. Exercises of this power may also take the form of commutations, a limited form of pardon where the sentence is reduced, on certain conditions. The granting of a pardon is not subject to judicial review, as confirmed by Council of Civil Service Unions v Minister for the Civil Service, but the courts have chosen to criticise its application or lack thereof, as in R v Secretary of State for the Home Department, ex parte Bentley. Granting nolle prosequi is done by the Attorney General for England and Wales (or the equivalent in Scotland or Northern Ireland) in the name of the Crown, to stop legal proceedings against an individual. This is not reviewable by the courts, as confirmed by R v Comptroller-General of Patents, ex parte Tomlinson, and does not count as an acquittal; the defendant may be brought before the courts on the same charge at a later date.

=== Foreign affairs ===
The royal prerogative is in much use in the realm of foreign affairs. It is the monarch who recognises foreign states (although several statutes regulate the immunities enjoyed by their heads and diplomatic representatives), issues declarations of war and peace, and forms international treaties. The monarch also has the power to annex territory, as was done in 1955 with the island of Rockall. Once territory has been annexed, the monarch has complete discretion as to the extent to which the government will take over the former government's liabilities; this was confirmed in West Rand Central Gold Mining Company v The King. Monarchs also have the power to alter British territorial waters and cede territory. Their freedom to do these things in practice is doubtful, in that they might deprive British citizens of their nationality and rights. When the island of Heligoland was ceded to Germany in 1890, parliamentary approval was first sought. Monarchs can also regulate colonies and dependent territories by exercising the prerogative through Orders in Council. The courts have long fought against the monarch's use of this power: in R (Bancoult) v Secretary of State for Foreign and Commonwealth Affairs (No 2), the Court of Appeal ruled that using Orders-in-Council to frustrate judicial rulings was an unlawful abuse of power, although this ruling was later overturned.

A judgment delivered in the Court of Appeal in 1988 (ex parte Everett), and re-stated in a ruling of the High Court delivered in July 2016, confirmed that granting or withdrawing British passports has always been an exercise of the royal prerogative, and continues to be exercisable at the Secretary of State's discretion.

Under the common law, citizens have the right freely to leave and enter the United Kingdom. In R v Foreign Secretary, ex parte Everett, the courts held that it was their right to review the granting of passports to, and the withholding of passports from, British citizens. The writ of ne exeat regno is also used to prevent a person leaving the country. The right to make treaties is a disputed prerogative power: under Blackstone's definition, a prerogative power must be one unique to the monarch.

It has been held that the use of the prerogative in the sphere of foreign affairs is non-justiciable because of their subject-matter. This is known as the Crown act of state doctrine.

=== Other prerogative powers ===
Monarchs also have power to exercise their prerogative over the granting of honours. Although the granting of most honours is normally decided by the executive, the person who technically awards them. Exceptions to this rule are membership of the Order of the Garter, the Order of the Thistle, the Order of Merit, the Royal Victorian Order and the Royal Victorian Chain, which the monarch has complete discretion to grant.

The right to bear the royal arms is a royal prerogative. Crown copyright applies in perpetuity to depictions of the royal arms and its constituent parts under the royal prerogative, and The National Archives restricts rights to reproduce them. Although Crown copyright usually expires 50 years after publication, Section 171(b) of the Copyright, Designs and Patents Act 1988 made an exception for 'any right or privilege of the Crown' not written in an act of parliament.

The prerogative empowers the monarch to appoint bishops and archbishops in the Church of England, and to regulate the printing and licensing of the Authorised (King James) Version of the Bible. The monarch also exerts a certain influence power on their weekly and closed conversations with the Prime Minister of the United Kingdom.

In relation to the armed forces, the monarch is the Commander in Chief, and members are regulated under the royal prerogative. Most statutes do not apply to the armed forces, although some areas, such as military discipline, are governed by Acts of Parliament. Under the Crown Proceedings Act 1947, the monarch is the sole authority for the armed forces, and as such their organisation, disposition and control cannot be questioned by the courts. This exercise of prerogative power gives the Crown authority to recruit members of the armed forces, appoint commissioned officers, and establish agreements with foreign governments to station troops in their territory.

R v Secretary of State for the Home Department, ex parte Northumbria Police Authority, recognised that the prerogative also includes the power to "take all reasonable steps to preserve the Queen's peace", and in Burmah Oil Co. v Lord Advocate, the House of Lords took the view that it extended to "doing all those things in an emergency which are necessary for the conduct of [the Second World War]."

== Use ==
Today, the monarch exercises the prerogative almost exclusively in line with the advice of the government. Leyland notes that:

The present Queen ... is kept very closely in touch with the exercise of governmental power by means of a weekly audience with the prime minister during which she is fully briefed about the affairs of government ... [But it] should be emphasised that the prime minister is not under any obligation to take account of royal opinions.

In simple terms, the prerogative is used by the prime minister and cabinet to govern the realm in the name of the Crown; although the monarch has the "right to be consulted, the right to encourage, and the right to warn", an action in that role involves no exercise of discretion. Under the right to warn, the monarch may present the prime minister with reasons to reconsider a choice, but the choice remains with the prime minister.

Today, some prerogative powers are directly exercised by ministers without the approval of Parliament, including the powers of declaring war and of making peace, the issue of passports, and the granting of honours. Prerogative powers are exercised nominally by the monarch, but on the advice of the prime minister (whom the monarch meets weekly) and of the cabinet. Some key functions of the British government are still executed by virtue of the royal prerogative, but generally the usage of the prerogative has been diminishing as functions are progressively put on a statutory basis.

=== Limitations ===
Several influential decisions of the House of Lords have determined the limited scope for the use of prerogative powers. In 1915, an appeal was made to the House of Lords, Re Petition of Right ("Shoreham Aerodrome Case"), but during the appeal the case was settled and the appeal withdrawn when the Crown agreed to pay compensation. The appeal was from a unanimous decision of the Court of Appeal that the Crown, both under the statutory Defence of the Realm Regulations and by the royal prerogative, was entitled to take and occupy, for military purposes in wartime, a commercial airfield on the south coast. The government argued that this action was to defend against an invasion; the courts held that for the prerogative to be exercised, the government must demonstrate that a threat of invasion exists. This was backed up by The Zamora (1916), where the Privy Council, on appeal from the Prize Court, held generally that to exercise a power not granted by statute (such as a prerogative power) the government must prove to the court that the exercise is justified. The next decision came in Attorney General v De Keyser's Royal Hotel Ltd (1920), where the House of Lords confirmed that a statutory provision in an area where prerogative powers are in use "abridges the Royal Prerogative while it is in force to this extent – that the Crown can only do the particular thing under and in accordance with the statutory provisions, and that its prerogative power to do that thing is in abeyance".

This principle of statutory superiority was extended in Laker Airway Ltd v Department of Trade, concerning the revocation of a commercial airline operator's licence (December 1976), where it was confirmed that prerogative powers could not be used to contradict a statutory provision, and that in situations to which the power and the statute both applied, the power could only be used to further the aim of the statute. Another extension came with R v Secretary of State for the Home Department, ex parte Fire Brigades Union, where the Court of Appeal held that even if a statute had not yet come into force, the prerogative could not be used to "conflict with Parliament's wishes" (in that case using its discretion to choose a start date to delay, perhaps indefinitely, the introduction of a statutory compensation scheme).

Whilst the royal prerogative is deployed by the UK government when making (and unmaking) treaties, the Supreme Court held in R (Miller) v Secretary of State for Exiting the European Union that the government could not use the prerogative to serve notice of termination of the UK's membership of the EU (under Article 50 of the Treaty on European Union). Instead legislative authority via an Act of Parliament was required by the Government. The Court's reasoning in the initial hearing was that such a notice would inevitably affect rights under domestic law (many EU rights having direct effect in the UK). On the assumption – later proven false (Note: On 10 December 2018, the Court of Justice of the European Union held that a state that had issued a notification under Article 50 was free to rescind it at will, without requiring the consent of the other Member States.) – that triggering Article 50 would inevitably result in Brexit, using the prerogative in this way would therefore frustrate the intention of Parliament to confer those rights. This reasoning was maintained in the subsequent Supreme Court hearing, although that judgement devoted more attention to the fact that Parliament had voted the UK into what was then the EEC by statute in 1972, which under the principle of De Keyser's Hotel (1920) superseded the normal prerogative power to enter into treaties. Following this decision, Parliament decided to provide legal authorisation to the Government to serve a notice in accordance with Article 50. This was duly granted in the European Union (Notification of Withdrawal) Act 2017 and Theresa May exercised the power on 29 March 2017.

=== Judicial review ===
Before the modern judicial review procedure superseded the petition of right as the remedy for challenging the validity of a prerogative power, the courts were traditionally only willing to state whether or not powers existed, not whether they had been used appropriately. They therefore applied only the first of the Wednesbury tests: whether the use was illegal. Constitutional scholars such as William Blackstone consider this appropriate:

In the exertion therefore of those prerogatives, which the law has given him, the King is irresistible and absolute, according to the forms of the constitution. And yet if the consequence of that exertion be manifestly to the grievance or dishonour of the kingdom, the Parliament will call his advisers to a just and severe account.

During the 1960s and 70s this attitude was changing, with Lord Denning saying in the Laker Airway case that "seeing that the prerogative is a discretionary power to be exercised for the public good, it follows that its exercise can be examined by the courts just as any other discretionary power which is vested in the executive." The most authoritative case on the matter is Council of Civil Service Unions v Minister for the Civil Service, generally known as the GCHQ case. The House of Lords confirmed that the application of judicial review would be dependent on the nature of the government's powers, not their source. Foreign policy and national security powers are considered outside the scope of judicial review, while the prerogative of mercy is considered within it, as per R v Secretary of State for the Home Department, ex parte Bentley.

== Reform ==
Abolition of the royal prerogative is not imminent, and recent movements to abolish the role of the monarchy and its royal prerogative in government have been unsuccessful. The Ministry of Justice undertook a "review of executive Royal Prerogative powers" in October 2009. Former Labour MP and cabinet minister Tony Benn campaigned unsuccessfully for the abolition of the royal prerogative in the United Kingdom in the 1990s, arguing that all governmental powers in effect exercised on the advice of the prime minister and cabinet should be subject to parliamentary scrutiny and require parliamentary approval. Later governments argued that such is the breadth of topics covered by the royal prerogative that requiring parliamentary approval in each instance where the prerogative is currently used would overwhelm parliamentary time and slow the enactment of legislation. More recently, the former leader of the opposition, Jeremy Corbyn has argued that, following the Iraq War, Britain's participation in future military conflicts ought to be based on a statutory footing, rather than being a function of the prerogative, as it currently is. Military experts, however, question whether the cumbersome procedures of parliamentary approval might hamper operational effectiveness in the field of conflict.

== See also ==
- A-G v De Keyser's Royal Hotel Ltd
- Executive privilege
- King-in-Parliament
- Letters patent
- Monarchy of Spain § Crown, constitution, and royal prerogatives
- Order in Council
- Reserve power
- Royal assent
- Royal charter
- Royal order

== Sources ==
- Amin, Nasser. "A law unto itself? Is the British Government’s use of archaic Royal Prerogative power sufficiently regulated by legal and political avenues? An analysis, with special reference to the prosecution of war." Journal of Contemporary Development & Management Studies 10 (2025): 8–15 online
- Barnett, Hilaire (2009). Constitutional & Administrative Law (7th ed.). Routledge-Cavendish. ISBN 978-0-415-45829-0.
- Bagehot, Walter (2001). The English Constitution. Cambridge University Press. ISBN 978-0-511-05297-2.
- Carroll, Alex (2007). Constitutional and Administrative Law (4th ed.). Pearson Longman. ISBN 978-1-4058-1231-3.
- Chrimes, S. B. (1956). "Richard II's questions to the judges 1387". Law Quarterly Review. lxxii: 365–390.
- Holdsworth, W. S. (1921). "The Prerogative in the Sixteenth Century". Columbia Law Review. 21 (6). Columbia Law School: 554–571. doi:10.2307/1111147. ISSN 0010-1958. JSTOR 1111147.
- Keen, Maurice Hugh (1973). England in the later middle ages: a political history (2003 ed.). Routledge. ISBN 978-0415272926. Chrimes, S. B. Richard II's questions to the judges 1387 in Law Quarterly Review lxxii: 365–90 (1956)
- Leyland, Peter; Anthony, Gordon (2009). Textbook on Administrative Law (6 ed.). Oxford University Press. ISBN 978-0-19-921776-2.
- Loveland, Ian (2009). Constitutional Law, Administrative Law, and Human Rights: A Critical Introduction (5th ed.). Oxford University Press. ISBN 978-0-19-921974-2.
- Ministry of Justice (2009). "Review of the Executive Royal Prerogative Powers: Final Report" (PDF). Archived from the original (PDF) on 10 March 2011.
- Waite, P. B. (1959). "The Struggle of Prerogative and Common Law in the Reign of James I". The Canadian Journal of Economics and Political Science. 25 (2). Blackwell Publishing: 144–152. doi:10.2307/139057. ISSN 0315-4890. JSTOR 139057.
- Williams, D. G. T. (1971). "The Prerogative and Parliamentary Control". The Cambridge Law Journal. 29 (2). Cambridge University Press. ISSN 0008-1973.
