= Auditor general =

Chief examiner of a (usually public) entity's accounting and documentation

An auditor general (also called comptroller general or comptroller and auditor general in some jurisdictions) is an independent public official responsible for auditing government finances and operations and reporting the results to the legislature, supporting oversight and government accountability.

Frequently, the institution headed by the auditor general is a member of the International Organization of Supreme Audit Institutions (INTOSAI).

== Auditors general of governments ==
=== Africa ===
- Auditor-General of Ghana
- Office of the Auditor-General (Kenya)
- Auditor-General (South Africa)

=== Americas ===
- Auditor General of Canada
  - Auditor General of Alberta
  - Auditor General of British Columbia
  - Auditor General of New Brunswick
  - Auditor General of Manitoba
  - Auditor General of Newfoundland and Labrador
  - Auditor General of Nova Scotia
  - Auditor General of Ontario
  - Auditor General of Prince Edward Island
  - Auditor General of Quebec
  - Provincial Auditor of Saskatchewan
- Comptroller General of the United States
  - New York State Comptroller
    - New York City Comptroller

=== Asia / Pacific ===
- Auditor-General of Australia
  - ACT Auditor-General
  - Northern Territory Auditor‑General
  - Auditor-General of New South Wales
  - Auditor-General of Queensland
  - Auditor-General of South Australia
  - Auditor-General of Tasmania
  - Auditor-General of Victoria
  - Auditor General of Western Australia
- Comptroller and Auditor General of Bangladesh
- Auditor-General of the National Audit Office
  - Director of Audit (Hong Kong)
  - Control Yuan of the Republic of China (on Taiwan since 1949)
- Comptroller and Auditor General of India
- Auditor General of Pakistan
- Auditor General of Singapore
- Auditor General of Sri Lanka
- Controller and Auditor-General of New Zealand

=== Europe ===
- Supreme Audit Office (Czech Republic)
- Comptroller and Auditor General (Ireland)
- Comptroller and Auditor General for Jersey
- Auditor General for the Isle of Man
- Comptroller and Auditor General (United Kingdom)
  - Comptroller and Auditor General for Northern Ireland
  - Auditor General for Scotland
  - Auditor General for Wales

== See also ==
- Chief audit executive
- Comptroller
- Comptroller of the Household
- Director of Audit (disambiguation)
- International Organization of Supreme Audit Institutions
- Treasurer
