= Comptroller and Auditor General (Ireland) =

Supreme audit institution of Ireland

The Comptroller and Auditor General (C&AG) (Irish: An tArd-Reachtaire Cuntas agus Ciste) is the constitutional officer responsible for public audit in Ireland. The Office of the Comptroller and Auditor General is the public audit body for the Republic of Ireland and is headed by the C&AG.

The Comptroller and Auditor General is ex-officio member of the Standards in Public Office Commission and was an ex-officio member of the Referendum Commission, before it was superseded by the Electoral Commission.

The C&AG is a member of the International Organization of Supreme Audit Institutions.

The current Comptroller and Auditor-General is Seamus McCarthy (since 28 May 2012).

== Constitutional officer and independence ==
The office of Comptroller and Auditor General was established under Article 33 of the Constitution of Ireland. The C&AG is appointed by the President on the nomination of Dáil Éireann. The office has its origins in Article 62 of the Constitution of the Irish Free State of 1922 as implemented by the Comptroller and Auditor-General Act 1923, which provided that the Comptroller and Auditor-General (Irish: Árd-Scrúdóir) (as the office was then known) was to be appointed by Dáil Éireann. The 1923 Act and the Comptroller and Auditor General (Amendment) Act 1993 are the two principal legislative instruments governing the C&AG. Both the Constitutional and legislative provisions ensure the absolute independence of the C&AG and the Office of the C&AG to operate independently of government. The C&AG makes reports to Dáil Éireann on the accounts of bodies falling within its remit, essentially the State or State bodies and certain specified agencies or bodies receiving State funds. The reports are examined in detail by the Dáil Committee of Public Accounts (Irish: An Coiste um Chuntais Phoiblí).

== Function ==
The Comptroller and Auditor General audits and reports on the use of public funds. It establishes that they are legal and used appropriately. It also examines the internal audit systems of public bodies and applies tests for value for money and effectiveness.

The bodies to be audited by the Comptroller and Auditor General are laid down by law. The Comptroller and Auditor General may receive new audit mandates from time to time regarding specific state bodies. It may lose its functions when bodies are dissolved, merged or rationalised.

The C&AG may not audit all recipients of state funding but only where audits of the recipient bodies are permitted or required by law. As a result, some bodies which receive a large amount of state funding or even are reliant on it, may not be subject to audit by the C&AG. This also has consequences for the remit of the Dáil Public Accounts Committee (PAC). The C&AG has permanent status as a witness at the PAC, and attends all meetings in person or deputes a senior staff official to attend instead.

=== Annual reports on the Accounts of the Public Service ===
The C&AG makes an annual report under the heading "Accounts of the Public Services" on funding granted by the Oireachtas. This includes the accounts of 41 government departments and offices, including the establishment of the President of Ireland, as well as bodies such as the Garda Síochána, prisons service, and the secret service. It publishes the relevant annual appropriation accounts together with the annual reports.

=== Health sector ===
The C&AG is responsible for auditing institutions in the health sector such as the Health Service Executive (HSE) and all regional health boards. It also audits specified hospitals, and a variety of health-related state agencies. It does not audit privately owned hospitals even though they may be in receipt of, or even reliant on, public funds.

If the C&AG considers problematic issues arise in relation to a regional health board which merit a public accountability audit, it may issue what is known as a Section 6 report, authorised by Section 6 of the Comptroller and Auditor General (Amendment) Act 1993.

=== Educational sector ===
In the education sector, the C&AG audits all Irish Universities, institutes of technology and other specified third-level educational institutions such as the National College of Art and Design. It audits all vocational educational committees. It also audits specified state bodies related to education such as the Higher Education Authority and the Royal Irish Academy.

If the C&AG considers problematic issues arise in relation to a Vocational Education Committee which merit a public accountability, it may issue what is known as a Section 7 report, authorized by Section 7 of the Comptroller and Auditor General (Amendment) Act 1993.

=== Financial sector ===
The Comptroller and Auditor General audits 25 state bodies in the financial sector including the National Treasury Management Agency (NTMA) and the National Asset Management Agency (NAMA).

=== Other audited bodies ===
The Comptroller and Auditor General audits a very wide variety (115 in 2012) of State bodies or agencies as diverse as the National Library of Ireland, the Road Safety Authority and the Abbey Theatre.

It audits all 35 County Enterprise Boards.

=== North/South bodies ===
The Comptroller and Auditor General carries out audits of the annual accounts of designated North/South public bodies with cross-border functions or activities relating to both the Republic of Ireland and Northern Ireland. These reports are prepared jointly with the Comptroller and Auditor General for Northern Ireland.

Where it is considered that an issue of public accountability arises, a report is drawn up.

An interesting example of cross-border cooperation between the two comptrollers and auditors general is seen in the Bytel cross-border broadband project where the Northern Ireland Audit Office and the Office of the Comptroller and Auditor General of Ireland made a coordinated examination of the Bytel project. Although the two comptrollers and auditors general issued separate reports, they were issued simultaneously on 3 March 2015 and the report of each comptroller and auditor general was annexed to the report of the other. This coordinated examination was the first time this approach has been used.

=== Value for money reports ===
The office publishes special reports on value-for-money according to orthodox value-for-money criteria (efficiency, economy, effectiveness evaluation systems, procedures, practices) used by public audit bodies.

=== Special reports ===
The C&AG from time to time publishes special reports on specific or general issues arising from audits, inspections or examinations carried out by him or his office.

== Bodies not audited ==
The C&AG does not audit commercial semi-state bodies even when these are overwhelmingly owned by the state. Examples include the ESB (Electricity Supply Board) or Bord na Móna (the Peat Board) both of which are 95% owned by the state. Likewise it does not audit the accounts of Uisce Éireann (the Water Board).

== List of Comptroller and Accountant General prior to 1923 ==
- 1684 – James Bonnell
- 1700 – William de Burgh of Bert, MP
- 1720 – Eustace Budgell
- 1734 – Agmondisham Vesey
- 1794 – John Richardson

== List of Comptroller and Auditors General since 1923 ==
- 1923 – George McGrath
- 1944 – John Maher
- 1949 – William Eugene Wann
- 1953 – Liam Ó Cadhla
- 1964 – Eugene Suttle
- 1973 – Sean Mac Gearailt
- 1981 – P.L. McDonnell
- 1994 – John Purcell
- 2008 – John Buckley
- 2012 – Seamus McCarthy
