= James Comyn =

Advocate and judge

Sir James Comyn
- Royal coat of arms of the United Kingdom

Justice of the High Court
- In office 9 January 1978 – 29 September 1985

Personal details
- Born: James Peter Comyn; 8 March 1921 Stillorgan, County Dublin
- Died: 5 January 1997 (aged 75) Navan, County Meath
- Spouse: Anne Chaundler (m. 1967)
- Children: 2
- Education: New College, Oxford

Sir James Peter Comyn (8 March 1921 – 5 January 1997) was an Irish-born barrister and English High Court judge. The scion of a prominent Nationalist legal family, Comyn was sent to England after they fell out with Éamon de Valera. Considered by many to be "the finest all-round advocate at the English bar", Comyn was appointed to the High Court of Justice in 1978, serving on the bench until his retirement in 1985.

== Early life ==
James Comyn was born at Beaufield House, Stillorgan, County Dublin, the son of Nationalist barrister James Comyn KC and of Mary Comyn; through his father he was the nephew of the barrister Michael Comyn KC. Both his father and uncle had been political and legal advisers to Éamon de Valera, who at one point used Beaufield House as a safe house. However, the Comyn brothers fell out with de Valera shortly before he came to power in 1932, and Michael Comyn was passed over as Attorney-General of the Free State. As a result, James Comyn, who was then attending Belvedere College in Dublin, was sent by his father to attend The Oratory School in England. Comyn spent six months as a trainee at The Irish Times under the editor R. M. Smyllie, but abandoned journalism after a joke he added to an obituary was printed in the paper, leading to his demotion to the racing department.

Comyn then matriculated at New College, Oxford, where he read law, graduating with second-class honours. In 1940, he defeated Roy Jenkins for the presidency of the Oxford Union, winning by four votes. After suffering the first of several breakdowns through his life, he briefly worked for the BBC's Empire Service during the Second World War.

== Career at the bar ==
Comyn was called to the English bar by the Inner Temple in 1942, the Irish Bar in 1947, and the Hong Kong bar in 1969. In 1944, he began his pupillage with Edward Holroyd Pearce KC, later a law lord, and joined his chambers at Fountain Court. Comyn practised in London and on the Western circuit, supplementing his earnings by teaching banking, a subject of which he knew nothing. On one occasion, he rose in Lambeth County court to cross-examine a female defendant in an eviction case; just as Comyn began by saying "Madam", the defendant opened her bag, took out a dead cat, and threw it at him. The judge's reaction was to tell the defendant: "Madam, if you do that again, I’ll commit you". Comyn won the case.

Comyn took silk in 1961, and acquired a large practice as a senior, appearing in many high-profile cases. In 1964, he won damages for libel for the former safe-breaker Alfie Hinds against a Scotland Yard inspector by convincing the jury that Hinds was in fact innocent. In 1970, he successfully defended the Labour MP Will Owen, who was accused of providing information to the Czechoslovak intelligence services. In 1975, he defeated the government's attempt to obtain an injunction against the publication of the diaries of former minister Richard Crossman (Attorney General v Jonathan Cape Ltd). Of his powers of advocacy, it was said that "Jimmy Comyn can take the stink out of everything".

Comyn was Recorder of Andover between 1964 and 1971 (honorary life recorder from 1972), commissioner of assize for the Western Circuit in 1971, and a Recorder of the Crown Court between 1972 and 1977. He was elected a bencher of the Inner Temple in 1968, and served as chairman of the Bar council from 1973 to 1974.

== Judicial career ==
Having refused a previous invitation by Lord Hailsham to join the bench, Comyn was again nominated by Lord Elwyn-Jones in 1977, and was appointed a High Court judge in 1978, receiving the customary knighthood upon his appointment. Initially assigned to the Family Division, he did not take to the work, and was reassigned to the Queen's Bench Division in 1979. He had a reputation for leniency in sentencing, first acquired as Recorder of Andover, when he was nicknamed "Probation Comyn". In 1980–81, he presided over an unsuccessful libel action by a member of the Unification Church (colloquially known as the Moonies) against the Daily Mail, the longest libel trial in England up to that time. His Irish background made him the target of IRA action, and in 1981 the Provisional IRA burnt his house in Tara. Recurring bouts of depression led to his early retirement, on grounds of ill health, in 1985.

In retirement, he divided his time between England and Ireland, whose citizenship he had retained. He wrote a number of books, including memoirs, light verse, and books on famous trials. He also bred Friesian cattle. He died on 5 January 1997 at age 75.

== Family ==
Comyn married Anne Chaundler, a solicitor, in 1967; they had two children. Lady Comyn died in 2018, aged 92.
