= Council of Civil Service Unions v Minister for the Civil Service =

United Kingdom constitutional law

CCSU v Minister for the Civil Service (GCHQ case)
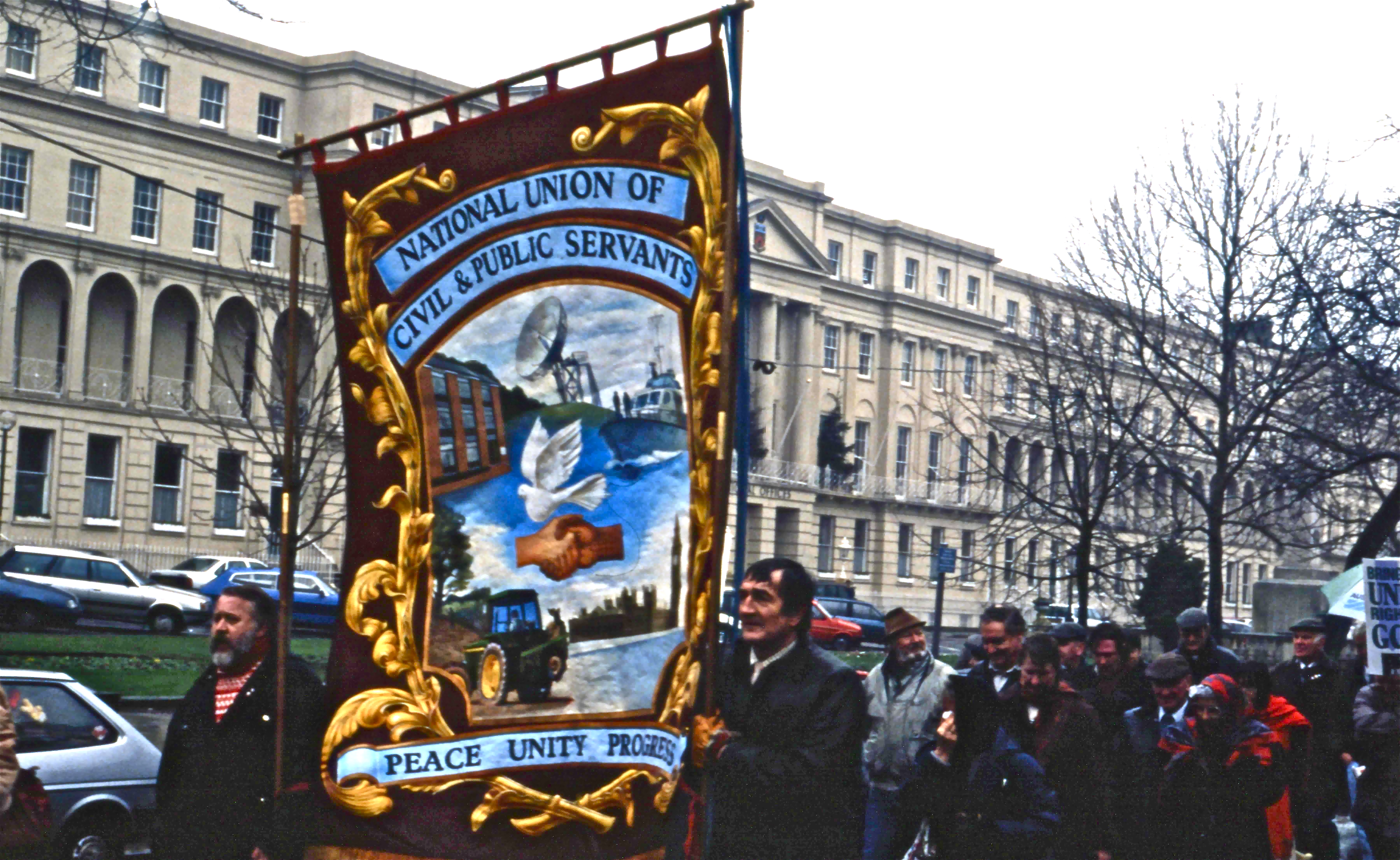
- Court: House of Lords
- Full case name: Council of Civil Service Unions & Others v Minister for the Civil Service
- Decided: 22 November 1984
- Citations: [1984] UKHL 9, [1985] AC 374, [1984] 3 WLR 1174, [1985] ICR 14, [1984] 3 All ER 935, [1985] IRLR 28
- ECLI: ECLI:CE:ECHR:1987:0120DEC001160385
- Transcript: Bailii transcript

Court membership
- Judges sitting: Lord Fraser of Tullybelton; Lord Scarman; Lord Diplock; Lord Roskill; Lord Brightman

Keywords
- Judicial review; royal prerogative; freedom of association; GCHQ

Council of Civil Service Unions v Minister for the Civil Service [1984] UKHL 9, or the GCHQ case, is a United Kingdom constitutional law and UK labour law case that held the royal prerogative was subject to judicial review.

In 1984, by issuing a directive based on an Order in Council made using the royal prerogative, the government of Margaret Thatcher banned employees of the Government Communications Headquarters (GCHQ) from joining any trade union for national security reasons. The Council of Civil Service Unions claimed in judicial review that the order defeated their legitimate expectation of being able to collectively bargain for fair wages. Glidewell J in the High Court held the instruction was invalid. The Court of Appeal held national security concerns meant that judicial review was impossible. The House of Lords held that exercises of the royal prerogative were subject to judicial review, but there were exceptions, including for matters of national security. This was a significant break from the previous law, which held that prerogative powers were not in any way subject to judicial review. The GCHQ case established that judicial review depends on the nature of the government's powers, not their source.

== Facts ==
The Government Communications Headquarters (GCHQ) is a British intelligence agency that provides signals intelligence to the British government and armed forces. Prior to 1983, its existence was not acknowledged although it openly recruited graduates. After a spy scandal in 1983, the organisation became known to the public, and Margaret Thatcher's government decided a year later that employees would not be allowed to join a trade union for reasons of national security. The Minister for the Civil Service is a position held ex officio by the Prime Minister.

That was done through powers contained in the Civil Service Order in Council 1982, an Order in Council, an exercise of the royal prerogative. These powers purported to allow the Minister for the Civil Service to make regulations for the Civil Service. Despite an extensive publicity campaign by trade unions, the government refused to reverse its decision but instead offered affected employees the choice between £1,000 and the membership of a staff association or dismissal. Employees dismissed could not rely on an industrial tribunal since they were not covered by the relevant employment legislation. As such, the Council of Civil Service Unions decided that judicial review was the only available route.

As regards Her Majesty's Home Civil Service ... the Minister for the Civil Service may from time to time make regulations or give instructions ... for controlling the conduct of the service, and providing for the classification of all persons employed therein and ... the conditions of service of all such persons ...

— Article 4, Civil Service Order in Council 1982

The directive issued to the Director of GCHQ by the prime minister (initially as a verbal instruction, then communicated by letter) was:

the conditions of service under which civil servants are employed as members of the staff of the Government Communications Headquarters shall be varied so as to provide that such civil servants shall not be members of any trade union other than a departmental staff association approved by yourself.

The decision to ban workers at GCHQ from trade union membership had been taken after the meeting of a select group of ministers and the prime minister, rather than the full Cabinet. That is not unusual, even in relation to high-profile decisions: a decision was similarly taken to authorise the Suez operation in 1956, and the same procedure was used in the decision to transfer the ability to set interest rates to the Bank of England in 1997.

== Judgment ==
=== High Court ===
In the High Court, Glidewell J held that the employees of GCHQ had a right to consultation, and that the lack of consultation made the decision invalid.

=== Court of Appeal ===
In the Court of Appeal, Lord Lane CJ, Watkins LJ and May LJ held that judicial review could not be used to challenge the use of the royal prerogative. They decided that as the determination of national security issues is an executive function, it would be inappropriate for the courts to intervene.

=== House of Lords ===
The House of Lords held the royal prerogative was subject to judicial review, just like statutory instruments. However, on national security grounds, the action of restricting the trade union was justified. Lords Fraser, Scarman and Diplock all believed that the issue of national security was outside the remit of the courts. Lord Diplock wrote "it is par excellence a non-justiciable question. The judicial process is totally inept to deal with the sort of problems which it involves." Lord Fraser stated that while the courts would not by default accept the government's argument that the matter was one of national security, it was a "matter of evidence" and the evidence provided in this case showed that the government was correct. Lord Diplock held that any prerogative power which impacted on a person's "private rights or legitimate expectations" was amenable to review, while Lords Fraser and Brightman held that only powers delegated from the monarch could be subject to judicial review as a candidate for such a review as the powers in question had been delegated from the monarch to the Minister for the Civil Service.

Lord Diplock said the following:

My Lords, I intend no discourtesy to counsel when I say that, intellectual interest apart, in answering the question of law raised in this appeal, I have derived little practical assistance from learned and esoteric analyses of the precise legal nature, boundaries and historical origin of "the prerogative," or of what powers exercisable by executive officers acting on behalf of central government that are not shared by private citizens qualify for inclusion under this particular label. It does not, for instance, seem to me to matter whether today the right of the executive government that happens to be in power to dismiss without notice any member of the home civil service upon which perforce it must rely for the administration of its policies, and the correlative disability of the executive government that is in power to agree with a civil servant that his service should be on terms that did not make him subject to instant dismissal, should be ascribed to "the prerogative" or merely to a consequence of the survival, for entirely different reasons, of a rule of constitutional law whose origin is to be found in the theory that those by whom the administration of the realm is carried on do so as personal servants of the monarch who can dismiss them at will, because the King can do no wrong.

Nevertheless, whatever label may be attached to them there have unquestionably survived into the present day a residue of miscellaneous fields of law in which the executive government retains decision-making powers that are not dependent upon any statutory authority but nevertheless have consequences on the private rights or legitimate expectations of other persons which would render the decision subject to judicial review if the power of the decision-maker to make them were statutory in origin. From matters so relatively minor as the grant of pardons to condemned criminals, of honours to the good and great, of corporate personality to deserving bodies of persons, and of bounty from moneys made available to the executive government by Parliament, they extend to matters so vital to the survival and welfare of the nation as the conduct of relations with foreign states and – what lies at the heart of the present case – the defence of the realm against potential enemies. Adopting the phraseology used in the European Convention on Human Rights 1953 (Convention for the Protection of Human Rights and Fundamental Freedoms (1953) (Cmd. 8969)) to which the United Kingdom is a party it has now become usual in statutes to refer to the latter as "national security."

My Lords, I see no reason why simply because a decision-making power is derived from a common law and not a statutory source, it should for that reason only be immune from judicial review. Judicial review has I think developed to a stage today when without reiterating any analysis of the steps by which the development has come about, one can conveniently classify under three heads the grounds upon which administrative action is subject to control by judicial review. The first ground I would call "illegality," the second "irrationality" and the third "procedural impropriety." That is not to say that further development on a case by case basis may not in course of time add further grounds. I have in mind particularly the possible adoption in the future of the principle of "proportionality" which is recognised in the administrative law of several of our fellow members of the European Economic Community; but to dispose of the instant case the three already well-established heads that I have mentioned will suffice.

By "illegality" as a ground for judicial review I mean that the decision-maker must understand correctly the law that regulates his decision-making power and must give effect to it. Whether he has or not is par excellence a justiciable question to be decided, in the event of dispute, by those persons, the judges, by whom the judicial power of the state is exercisable.

By "irrationality" I mean what can by now be succinctly referred to as "Wednesbury unreasonableness" (Associated Provincial Picture Houses Ltd v Wednesbury Corporation [1948] 1 KB 223). It applies to a decision which is so outrageous in its defiance of logic or of accepted moral standards that no sensible person who had applied his mind to the question to be decided could have arrived at it. Whether a decision falls within this category is a question that judges by their training and experience should be well equipped to answer, or else there would be something badly wrong with our judicial system. To justify the court's exercise of this role, resort I think is today no longer needed to Viscount Radcliffe's ingenious explanation in Edwards v Bairstow [1956] AC 14 of irrationality as a ground for a court's reversal of a decision by ascribing it to an inferred though unidentifiable mistake of law by the decision-maker. "Irrationality" by now can stand upon its own feet as an accepted ground on which a decision may be attacked by judicial review.

I have described the third head as "procedural impropriety" rather than failure to observe basic rules of natural justice or failure to act with procedural fairness towards the person who will be affected by the decision. This is because susceptibility to judicial review under this head covers also failure by an administrative tribunal to observe procedural rules that are expressly laid down in the legislative instrument by which its jurisdiction is conferred, even where such failure does not involve any denial of natural justice. But the instant case is not concerned with the proceedings of an administrative tribunal at all.

My Lords, that a decision of which the ultimate source of power to make it is not a statute but the common law (whether or not the common law is for this purpose given the label of "the prerogative") may be the subject of judicial review on the ground of illegality is, I think, established by the cases cited by my noble and learned friend, Lord Roskill, and this extends to cases where the field of law to which the decision relates is national security, as the decision of this House itself in Burmah Oil Co Ltd v Lord Advocate, 1964 SC (HL) 117 shows. While I see no a priori reason to rule out "irrationality" as a ground for judicial review of a ministerial decision taken in the exercise of "prerogative" powers, I find it difficult to envisage in any of the various fields in which the prerogative remains the only source of the relevant decision-making power a decision of a kind that would be open to attack through the judicial process upon this ground. Such decisions will generally involve the application of government policy. The reasons for the decision-maker taking one course rather than another do not normally involve questions to which, if disputed, the judicial process is adapted to provide the right answer, by which I mean that the kind of evidence that is admissible under judicial procedures and the way in which it has to be adduced tend to exclude from the attention of the court competing policy considerations which, if the executive discretion is to be wisely exercised, need to be weighed against one another – a balancing exercise which judges by their upbringing and experience are ill-qualified to perform. So I leave this as an open question to be dealt with on a case to case basis if, indeed, the case should ever arise.

Lord Roskill said the following:

In short the orthodox view was at that time that the remedy for abuse of the prerogative lay in the political and not in the judicial field.

But fascinating as it is to explore this mainstream of our legal history, to do so in connection with the present appeal has an air of unreality. To speak today of the acts of the sovereign as "irresistible and absolute" when modern constitutional convention requires that all such acts are done by the sovereign on the advice of and will be carried out by the sovereign's ministers currently in power is surely to hamper the continual development of our administrative law by harking back to what Lord Atkin once called, albeit in a different context, the clanking of mediaeval chains of the ghosts of the past: see United Australia Ltd v Barclays Bank Ltd [1941] AC 1, 29. It is, I hope, not out of place in this connection to quote a letter written in 1896 by the great legal historian F. W. Maitland to Dicey himself: "the only direct utility of legal history (I say nothing of its thrilling interest) lies in the lesson that each generation has an enormous power of shaping its own law": see Richard A. Cosgrove, The Rule of Law; Albert Venn Dicey; Victorian Jurist (1980), p.177. Maitland was in so stating a greater prophet than even he could have foreseen for it is our legal history which has enabled the present generation to shape the development of our administrative law by building upon but unhampered by our legal history.

My Lords, the right of the executive to do a lawful act affecting the rights of the citizen, whether adversely or beneficially, is founded upon the giving to the executive of a power enabling it to do that act. The giving of such a power usually carries with it legal sanctions to enable that power if necessary to be enforced by the courts. In most cases that power is derived from statute though in some cases, as indeed in the present case, it may still be derived from the prerogative. In yet other cases, as the decisions show, the two powers may coexist or the statutory power may by necessary implication have replaced the former prerogative power. If the executive in pursuance of the statutory power does an act affecting the rights of the citizen, it is beyond question that in principle the manner of the exercise of that power may today be challenged on one or more of the three grounds which I have mentioned earlier in this speech. If the executive instead of acting under a statutory power acts under a prerogative power and in particular a prerogative power delegated to the respondent under article 4 of the Order in Council of 1982, so as to affect the rights of the citizen, I am unable to see, subject to what I shall say later, that there is any logical reason why the fact that the source of the power is the prerogative and not statute should today deprive the citizen of that right of challenge to the manner of its exercise which he would possess were the source of the power statutory. In either case the act in question is the act of the executive. To talk of that act as the act of the sovereign savours of the archaism of past centuries. In reaching this conclusion I find myself in agreement with my noble and learned friends Lord Scarman and Lord Diplock whose speeches I have had the advantage of reading in draft since completing the preparation of this speech.

But I do not think that that right of challenge can be unqualified. It must, I think, depend upon the subject matter of the prerogative power which is exercised. Many examples were given during the argument of prerogative powers which as at present advised I do not think could properly be made the subject of judicial review. Prerogative powers such as those relating to the making of treaties, the defence of the realm, the prerogative of mercy, the grant of honours, the dissolution of Parliament and the appointment of ministers as well as others are not, I think, susceptible to judicial review because their nature and subject matter is such as not to be amenable to the judicial process. The courts are not the place wherein to determine whether a treaty should be concluded or the armed forces disposed in a particular manner or Parliament dissolved on one date rather than another.

In my view the exercise of the prerogative which enabled the oral instructions of 22 December 1983 to be given does not by reason of its subject matter fall within what for want of a better phrase I would call the "excluded categories" some of which I have just mentioned. It follows that in principle I can see no reason why those instructions should not be the subject of judicial review.

== Significance ==
In the exertion therefore of those prerogatives, which the law has given him, the King is irresistible and absolute, according to the forms of the constitution. And yet if the consequence of that exertion be manifestly to the grievance or dishonour of the kingdom, the Parliament will call his advisers to a just and severe account.

— William Blackstone

The courts have traditionally been unwilling to subject prerogative powers to judicial review. Judges were willing to state only whether or not powers existed, not whether they had been used appropriately. They therefore applied only the first of the Wednesbury tests: whether the use was illegal. Constitutional scholars such as William Blackstone would have considered that to be appropriate.

The GCHQ case, therefore, was highly important since it held that the application of judicial review would be dependent on the nature of the government's powers, not their source. While the use of the royal prerogative for national security reasons is considered outside the scope of the courts, most of its other uses are now judicially reviewable in some form.

The GCHQ case also confirmed that non-legal conventions might be subject to "legitimate expectation". A convention would not have usually been litigable, and it was necessary for the court to demonstrate that it was in the present case: such a rule had been established in respect of Cabinet conventions in Attorney General v Jonathan Cape Ltd. Although the court ruled against the union, it was accepted that the invariable practice of the executive formed a basis for legitimate expectation.

The case also shows that national security remains a political issue, not a legal one: it is not to be determined by a court.

It summarises the scope of judicial review.

=== Further developments ===
The Council of Civil Service Unions, with others, submitted the case to the European Court of Human Rights, but it was deemed inadmissible.

There is no difference between the conclusion reached by your Lordships except ... whether the reviewability of an exercise of a prerogative power is limited to the case where the power has been delegated to the decision-maker by Order in Council, so that the decision-making process which is sought to be reviewed arises [within] the terms of that order; or whether reviewability may also extend, in an appropriate case, to a direct exercise of a prerogative power.

— Lord Brightman, CCSU v Minister for the Civil Service

In R (Bancoult) v Secretary of State for Foreign and Commonwealth Affairs (No 2), heard at the House of Lords, one of the matters decided was whether or not the courts could subject Orders in Council to judicial review. The Lords unanimously agreed that although Orders in Council were defined as "primary legislation" in the Human Rights Act, there is a significant difference in that Orders in Council are an executive product and lack the "representative character" that comes with parliamentary authority and approval. As such, the Lords saw "no reason why prerogative legislation should not be subject to review on ordinary principles of legality, rationality and procedural impropriety in the same way as any other executive action".

In Rahmatullah (No 2) v Ministry of Defence; Mohammed v Ministry of Defence it has been held that Crown acts of state, although done under the prerogative, are non-justiciable because they relate to the subject matter of foreign affairs.

In R (Miller) v The Prime Minister and Cherry v Advocate General for Scotland [2019] UKSC 41 the Supreme Court quashed an Order in Council that sought to prorogue Parliament.

== Bibliography ==
- Barrow, Charles (2002). Industrial relations law (2nd ed.). Routledge. ISBN 1-85941-563-6.
- Blom-Cooper, Louis; Drabble, Richard (2010). "GCHQ revisited". Public Law. 2010 (1). Sweet & Maxwell. ISSN 0033-3565.
- Bradley, Anthony W.; Ewing, Keith D. (2011). Constitutional and Administrative Law (15 ed.). Harlow, United Kingdom: Longman. ISBN 978-1-4058-7350-5.
- Ewing, Keith D. (1985). "Prerogative. Judicial Review. National Security". Cambridge Law Journal. 44 (1). Cambridge University Press: 1–3. doi:10.1017/S0008197300114278. ISSN 0008-1973. S2CID 145714522.
- James, Simon (1997). British government: a reader in policy making. Routledge. ISBN 0-415-11304-0.
- Loveland, Ian (2009). Constitutional Law, Administrative Law, and Human Rights: A Critical Introduction (5th ed.). Oxford University Press. ISBN 978-0-19-921974-2.
- McGaughey, Ewan (2019). "8: Trade Unions". A Casebook on Labour Law. Hart. ISBN 978-1-84946-931-9.
- Poole, Thomas (2010). "The royal prerogative". International Journal of Constitutional Law. 8 (1). Oxford University Press: 146–155. doi:10.1093/icon/mop038. ISSN 1474-2640.
