= Purchas =

Purchas is a surname. Notable people with the surname include:

- Francis Purchas (1919–2003), English judge
- Guyon Purchas (1862–1940), Australian architect
- John Purchas (1823–1872), English Anglican priest
- Samuel Purchas (c. 1577–1626), English Anglican priest and writer
