= Justiciability =

Whether a court can or cannot rule upon something

Justiciability concerns the limits upon legal issues over which a court can exercise its judicial authority. It includes, but is not limited to, the legal concept of standing, which is used to determine if the party bringing the suit is a party appropriate to establishing whether an actual adversarial issue exists. Essentially, justiciability seeks to address whether a court possesses the ability to provide adequate resolution of the dispute; where a court believes that it cannot offer such a final determination, the matter is not justiciable.

== In the United States ==
=== Federal courts ===
Justiciability relates to the several factors federal courts use to determine whether they have authority to hear the cases brought before them. Rules regarding justiciability can be of either a constitutional or prudential nature. The constitutional rules stem from express or implicit powers and limitations given to the federal courts under Article III. The prudential rules arise from contextual situations where federal courts do not feel it would be appropriate for them to resolve a case.

==== Constitutional rules ====
The constitutional rules governing justiciability stem directly from the text of the Constitution, whether express or implied. The clause primarily affecting the ability of federal courts to adjudicate is Article III, § 2. This section extends the federal judicial power to "all cases, in law and equity, arising under this Constitution, the laws of the United States, and treaties made, or which shall be made, under their authority", and further enumerates the subject matter of other cases or controversies arising under either state or local law to which the federal judicial power shall also extend. Implicitly, the rules regard either the nature of the case or the nature of the parties.

For a dispute to rise to the level of a case or controversy, it must first have a party seeking to enforce its rights before a court in a manner prescribed by law; that is, under the ordinary processes established by law and custom. Implicitly, this requires that the dispute be one of a nature commonly viewed as capable of having a court act upon it in a specific and conclusive manner. For a court to act upon a case, however, the dispute must concern a definite and concrete matter. For it to even be a dispute, it requires the parties have adverse legal interests. From these characteristics may be distilled factors determining the justiciability of a case or controversy before a federal court:

1. As an initial question in every case before any federal court, the dispute must fall within the subject-matter jurisdiction of the federal courts as set out in Article III, § 2.
2. Federal courts may not issue advisory opinions. That is, a dispute before a federal court must involve an real question of fact or law, and must be neither hypothetical, abstract, speculative, nor academic. Disputes wherein a party seeks declaratory relief do not qualify as advisory opinions because the dispute itself is over where the precise boundaries of each party's rights and obligations are to be drawn and the court's decision resolves that dispute in a manner binding upon each party.
3. The dispute must involve an actual controversy between the parties before the court; that is, the parties must be seeking a different legal outcome. This rule prevents federal courts from hearing a collusive suit or friendly suit.
4. With respect to the timing of the dispute, the question must be neither unripe nor moot.
  - A dispute is unripe when either no concrete injury exists, or where no concrete injury is imminently pending. An example where a dispute may be unripe would be one in which every alternative to judicial resolution has not yet been exhausted.
  - A dispute has become moot when one of the parties has lost its stake in the outcome. This can occur where the injury has ceased or the cause of the injury has been removed. However, to prevent legal gamesmanship, several exceptions to the mootness doctrine exist.
5. The dispute must not seek resolution on a political question. Political questions are those matters which are constitutionally committed to either the legislative or executive branches, or are otherwise beyond the competency of courts. In Baker v. Carr, the Supreme Court of the United States identified six factors which it considered indicative of cases involving political questions:
  - "a textually demonstrable constitutional commitment of the issue to a coordinate political department" (meaning that the U.S. Constitution requires another branch of government to resolve questions regarding the issue);
  - "a lack of judicially discoverable and manageable standards for resolving [a dispute]";
  - an "impossibility of deciding [a dispute] without an initial policy determination of a kind clearly for nonjudicial discretion";
  - an "impossibility of a court's undertaking independent resolution without expressing lack of the respect due coordinate branches of government";
  - "an unusual need for unquestioning adherence to a political decision already made"; or
  - a "potentiality of embarrassment from multifarious pronouncements by various departments on one question."

Examples of political questions include such issues as whether the nation is "at war" with another country, or whether the U.S. Senate has properly "tried" an impeached federal officer.

Where a dispute cannot pass beyond all of the above factors, a federal court is considered as constitutionally barred from hearing it. Even if a dispute does clear all of the above factors, resolution of the dispute by a federal court still may be constitutionally barred if the parties themselves lack standing.

==== Prudential rules ====
While certain disputes may clear all of the constitutional factors of justiciability and standing which otherwise would bar it from being heard in federal court, the courts themselves have created other rules which may serve to divest a dispute of its justiciable nature. The concepts undergirding the constitutional factors for justiciability and standing generally serve to support the court-created prudential rules.

Federal courts typically use the following rules to dismiss disputes as nonjusticiable:

1. The general rule against federal or state taxpayer standing. However, this rule has exceptions rooted in the First Amendment.
2. The rule against third-party standing or third-party claims.
3. The rule against generalized grievances.
4. The zone of interest test.

However, other prudential rules exist which might save a dispute from the prudential rules above:

1. Representational standing. The form of standing allows for organizations and associations to represent their members, agents to represent their principals, states to represent their citizens, assignees to prosecute their assigned claims, and finally, in the context of First Amendment overbreadth challenges, the pursuit of claims involving the rights of potentially chilled third parties.
2. Federal and state legislative standing. This rule allows legislators standing to litigate claims defending their institution's powers and prerogatives.
3. Adverse intervenor standing. This rule allows an adverse third party to intervene in litigation where the initial adverse parties have come to a tentative agreement that would thereafter result in a friendly suit, provided the adverse intervenor will suffer some concrete harm were the outcome to comport with the agreement reached by the initial parties.

As with judge-made rules in general, Congress has power to expand, limit, or prohibit prudential justiciability rules by law.

=== State courts ===
State courts tend to require a similar set of circumstances, although some states permit their courts to give advisory opinions on questions of law, even though there may be no actual dispute between parties to resolve. Unlike federal courts with limited jurisdiction, state courts are not bound by the “case or controversy” clause of Art. III, Section 2 of the U.S. Constitution. Federal courts' decisions on mootness, advisory opinions, and related matters may be considered and even found persuasive, depending on the state's laws, but are not controlling.

Under the "ministerial exception" based on the First Amendment, courts decline to hear defamation, employment and other actions founded on statements or beliefs that necessarily implicate the truth or falsity of religious doctrine.

== In the United Kingdom ==
The issue of non-justiciability has been recognized in Buttes Gas and Oil Co. v Hammer, where Lord Wilberforce stated that the principle "that the courts will not adjudicate upon the transactions of foreign sovereign states" is not a matter of discretion, but is "inherent in the nature of the judicial process". The principle was further developed in Kuwait Airways Corp. v Iraqi Airways Co..

The doctrine of Crown act of state is that acts of the Government under the royal prerogative, in the field of foreign affairs, are non-justiciable because of their subject-matter.
