= Crown act of state =

Doctrine of UK constitutional law

In British constitutional law, a Crown act of state is an act of an inherently governmental nature, done under the royal prerogative, in the sphere of foreign affairs. It gives rise to the constitutional doctrine that such acts are non-justiciable and that the Government cannot be held liable for them in domestic law (for example, in tort).

The doctrine encompasses two interconnected rules. The first is that a servant of the Crown has a defence, to either criminal prosecution or proceedings in tort, for actions committed abroad and which were subsequently ratified by the Crown. The second is that British domestic courts cannot take cognisance of (and therefore must treat as non-justiciable) acts of the Crown under the royal prerogative in the sphere of foreign affairs. Such acts may include, for example, the conduct of overseas military operations, the making of treaties and the annexation of territory.

The rationale for the doctrine is for consistency; the Crown is vested with sole control over international affairs, and in doing so it acts on behalf of "the whole nation." As the Crown's conduct in foreign affairs necessarily leads to conduct which would otherwise be tortious (especially in the course of military operations), it would be inconsistent to accept the Crown's power over foreign affairs and at the same time "treat as civil wrongs acts inherent in its exercise of that power."

== Origin ==
It has long been recognised that English law "does not recognise that there is an indefinite class of acts concerning matters of high policy or public security which may be left to the uncontrolled discretion of the Government and which are outside the jurisdiction of the courts." Such a principle was established in the leading case of Entick v Carrington. However, the courts have also recognised a narrow class of exceptions to this principle; namely, acts in the sphere of foreign affairs.

The source of the defence in tort comes from the case of Buron v Denman. In that case, Commander Denman liberated several hundred slaves near the mouth of the Gallinas river in West Africa. Señor Buron, one of the slavers, brought an action in trespass against him, claiming damages for the loss of his chattels, including the slaves. Parke B, in directing the jury, held that Government's ratification of acts, which would otherwise amount to trespass to chattels, turned them into acts of state, for which Denman could not be sued in tort.

Before the leading case of Council of the Civil Service Unions v Minister for the Civil Service, it was held that all acts under the royal prerogative were non-justiciable. Accordingly, Crown acts of state fell under that rule of non-justiciability. However, even since that case established that acts under the prerogative could be justiciable, it has been held in subsequent cases that Crown acts of state fell into a narrow exception to this rule.

== Doctrine ==
The doctrine has been expressed in this way:

"The first rule is one which provides a defendant, normally a servant of the Crown, with a defence to an act otherwise tortious or criminal, committed abroad, provided that the act was authorised or subsequently ratified by the Crown. It is established that this defence may be pleaded against an alien, if done abroad, but not against a friendly alien if the act was done in Her Majesty's Dominions. [...]

The second rule is one of justiciability: it prevents British municipal courts from taking cognisance of certain acts. The class of acts so protected has not been accurately defined: one formulation is 'those acts of the Crown which are done under the prerogative in the sphere of foreign affairs'. (Wade and Phillips's Constitutional Law, 7th ed (1956), p 263). As regards such acts it is certainly the law that the injured person, if an alien, cannot sue in a British court and can only have resort to diplomatic protest."

— Lord Wilberforce, Nissan v Attorney General [1970] AC 179, at 231

The doctrine has rarely been pleaded in the past 100 years, and so case law is scant. In recent years, the doctrine has been used in cases involving alleged tortious acts committed by British forces in Iraq or Afghanistan, such as in Rahmatullah (No 2) v Ministry of Defence; Mohammed v Ministry of Defence.

The doctrine comes from the principle that in the sphere of foreign affairs, the nation acts "with one voice" (that of the executive), and that the judiciary should avoid interfering with the government's actions in this sphere.
