= R v Secretary of State for the Home Department, ex parte Northumbria Police Authority =

- Court: Court of Appeal of England and Wales
- Decided: 18 November 1987
- Citations: [1987] EWCA Civ 5; [1989] 1 QB 26
- Transcript: transcript at BAILII

Case history
- Prior action: Divisional Court

Court membership
- Judges sitting: Purchas LJ; Croom-Johnson LJ; Nourse LJ

Keywords
- Royal Prerogative

R v Secretary of State for the Home Department, ex parte Northumbria Police Authority [1989] 1 QB 26 was an English administrative law decision that first recognised the prerogative power to do whatever "was necessary to meet either an actual or an apprehended threat to the peace". It concerned the Home Office's decision to maintain a store of CS gas and plastic baton rounds. In 1986, a Home Office circular, 40/1986, authorised the Home Secretary to release this store to a police force without the approval of the Police Authority if Her Majesty's Inspectorate of Constabulary agreed that it was necessary. The Northumbria Police Authority brought a judicial review case against this decision, arguing that it was ultra vires. The Divisional Court which heard the case recognised a prerogative power to keep the peace, which authorised the Home Office's actions. On appeal to the Court of Appeal of England and Wales, the decision was confirmed, although several more grounds for allowing the distribution of the store were also given.

== Facts ==
Following riots in the early 1980s, the Home Office created a store of CS gas and plastic baton rounds, which could be provided to police forces in situations of public disorder. A Home Office circular, 40/1986, authorised the Home Secretary to release this store to a police force without the approval of the Police Authority if Her Majesty's Inspectorate of Constabulary agreed that it was necessary. The Northumbria Police Authority brought a judicial review case against the Home Secretary, arguing that the open-ended nature of this circular made it ultra vires.

== Judgment ==
The case was first heard by a Divisional Court, composed of Watkins LJ and Mann J. Mann, with Watkins concurring, rejected the Northumbria Police Authority's argument, saying that under the Royal Prerogative HM Government retained the right to do whatever "was necessary to meet either an actual or an apprehended threat to the peace", something that had not previously been recognised as a prerogative power. A stumbling block to this was the previous judgment in Attorney General v De Keyser's Royal Hotel Ltd, which confirmed that where statutory provisions and prerogative powers acted in the same area, the prerogative power could not be used contrary to the provisions. Section 4(4) of the Police Act 1964 stated that "police authorities are to provide for the supply of equipment to their local forces", something that conflicted with the exercise of the prerogative. To get around this, Mann stated that section 4(4) did not "confer a monopoly power so as to limit the prerogative by implication", and was not the "statutory equivalent" of the prerogative, something Conor Gearty describes as "rather mystifying".

The case then went to the Court of Appeal of England and Wales, where it was heard by Purchas, Croom-Johnson and Nourse LJJ, and judgment given on 18 November 1987. The Court of Appeal relied on section 41 of the 1964 act, which allows the Home Secretary to "provide ... such ... organisations and services as he considers necessary and expedient for promoting the efficiency of the police"; they found that this covered not only setting up the central store, but also providing the equipment to police forces. At the same time, they affirmed the Divisional Court's findings about the prerogative power to do whatever "was necessary to meet either an actual or an apprehended threat to the peace". For this, they relied on the fact that police officers, sworn to the Crown, had a duty to keep the peace, and that the Crown had a duty to protect its citizens.

== Significance ==
The case recognised a never-before discussed prerogative power; while creating prerogative powers violates precedent, it was found that this power had existed but had not been used. The court's decision was criticised; academic Robert Ward writes in the Cambridge Law Journal that it has "Full marks for creative thinking, but the result looks distinctly like that constitutional solecism, the recognition of a new prerogative ... the impact of the prerogative power to maintain the peace is potentially so far-reaching as to make the decision look rather like a Pandora's box – from which a host of evils were loosed upon the world."

== Bibliography ==
- Beynon, Helen (1987). "Prerogative to supply plastic baton rounds and CS gas to the police". Public Law. 1987 (2). Sweet & Maxwell. ISSN 0033-3565.
- Bradley, A.W. (1988). "Police powers and the prerogative". Public Law. 1988 (3). Sweet & Maxwell. ISSN 0033-3565.
- Gearty, Conor (1987). "The Courts and Recent Exercises of the Prerogative". Cambridge Law Journal. 46 (3). Cambridge University Press: 372–374. doi:10.1017/S000819730011726X. ISSN 0008-1973. S2CID 143683236.
- Loveland, Ian (2009). Constitutional Law, Administrative Law, and Human Rights: A Critical Introduction (5th ed.). Oxford University Press. ISBN 978-0-19-921974-2.
- Ward, Robert (1988). "Baton Rounds and Circulars". Cambridge Law Journal. 47 (2). Cambridge University Press: 155–157. doi:10.1017/S0008197300117842. ISSN 0008-1973. S2CID 145809461.
