= Auditor-General of Victoria =

The Victorian Auditor-General is an independent officer of the Victorian Parliament, which was established in 1851. The office is setup to provide assurances to the parliament as well as the Victorian community about the effectiveness of public sector agencies through a program of financial and performance audits covering state and local public sector entities.

The current serving Victorian Auditor General is Andrew Greaves who has been serving since 2016. Greaves was reappointed for another seven year term in 2023.
