= Francis Purchas =

British judge (1919–2003)

Sir Francis Brooks "Bob" Purchas, PC (19 June 1919 – 9 September 2003) was a British judge who sat on the Court of Appeal.

== Early life ==
Francis Brooks Purchas was the son of Captain Francis Purchas of the 5th Royal Irish Lancers. As a child, Francis was taken for a short time to India, where his father was posted. It was there that he acquired the nickname "Bob", a shortened version of the Hindi for baby. He was educated at Marlborough College and Trinity College, Cambridge, where he was a member of the Hawks' Club.

His time in Cambridge was interrupted by the outbreak of the Second World War. Commissioned into the Royal Engineers, he served on General Eisenhower's general staff in the North Africa Campaign as a cartographer where he was awarded the Africa Star. Later in the war, he would also win the Italy Star during the advance into Italy. He later served at the Allied Military Commission in Vienna, and was eventually demobilised as an honorary lieutenant colonel.

After the War, he returned to Cambridge, and switched to studying law. He graduated and was called to the Bar in 1948. Later he would specialise in parliamentary and local government work. He took Silk in 1965, and served as leader of the South Eastern circuit from 1972 to 1974.

== Family ==
He married Patricia Milburn in 1942, whom he had met whilst studying at Cambridge. They had two sons. Slightly unusually, whilst Sir Francis was sitting as a Court of Appeal judge, both his sons were practising at the bar as Queen's Counsel.

== Judicial career ==
Whilst still a barrister he served as deputy chairman of East Sussex Quarter Sessions (1966–71), Recorder of Canterbury (1969–71), and as Recorder of the Crown Court (1972–74). Finally Purchas was appointed a Judge of the Family Division of the High Court in 1974, at the age of 54.

In 1977, he became Presiding Judge on the South Eastern Circuit, and that year sat at Lewes Crown Court in the trial of a daughter found guilty of aiding and abetting the attempted suicide of her mother. It was the first time a defendant, other than the surviving partner of a suicide pact, had been so charged.

He was elevated to the Court of Appeal in 1982. One of his first cases in the Court of Appeal was the libel trial of the former Welsh rugby international J. P. R. Williams in relation to "shamateurism" claims in The Daily Telegraph.

As a judge Lord Justice Purchas was remembered as a judge who always strove to apply broad common sense and not to allow rigid legal doctrine to get in the way of doing justice.

== Public comments ==
During a lecture to the Family Bar Association in 1994, he criticised the Lord Chancellor of the time, Lord Mackay of Clashfern, accusing him of presiding over a creeping encroachment of executive power over judicial independence.

He called for the Lord Chancellor to lose his role as head of the judiciary, and for the Lord Chief Justice to take over responsibility for judges' numbers, salaries and pensions, arguing "complicated cases to be tried by a judge who is not accepted as being qualified to try it is just as serious a denial of justice as a court list influenced by dishonest civil servants to get a public authority's case before a supposedly sympathetic judge".

== Judgments ==
Notable judicial decisions included:

- Williams v Roffey Bros & Nicholls (Contractors) Ltd
- Lloyds Bank plc v Rosset
- R v Secretary of State for the Home Department, ex p Northumbria Police Authority
