= R v Comptroller-General of Patents, ex parte Tomlinson =

United Kingdom patent case

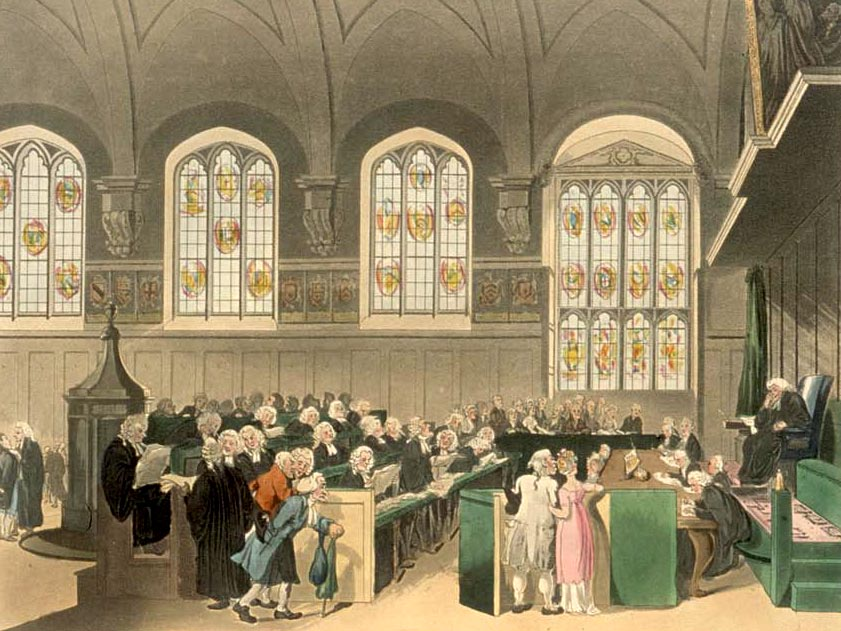
- Court of Chancery
- Court: Court of Appeal
- Full case name: The Queen v. The Comptroller-General of Patents. Ex parte Tomlinson
- Decided: 11-12 April 1899
- Citations: 16 R.P.C. 233, L. R. [1899] 1 QB 909 (CA)
- Transcript: Reports of Patent, Design and Trade Mark Cases

Case history
- Appealed from: High Court of Justice

Court membership
- Judges sitting: Lord Justice A. L. Smith; Lord Justice Collins; Lord Justice Romer

Keywords
- Nolle prosequi; Writ of mandamus; locus standi; Locum tenens; Patents, Designs, and Trade Marks Act 1883; Patents, Designs, and Trade Marks Act 1888

R v Comptroller-General of Patents, ex parte Tomlinson [1899] 1 QB 909 (CA), or Ex parte Tomlinson, is a United Kingdom patent case concerning standing in terms of who can have an interest in opposing the grant of a patent. An application for a writ of mandamus was made to compel the Comptroller to hear and determine the arguments for Tomlinson's opposition. The appeal was dismissed as there were existing provisions to deal with an improperly granted patent where more directly interested persons were able to apply for the revocation of the patent in question. The Court of Appeal held that the decision of the Law Officer was the final authority.

== Facts ==
Felix Meyer had an existing patent in 1897 relating to looms. The next year, Meyer applied for a further patent in order to make improvements to the operation of power looms so as to be able to weave two or more cloths at the same time.

John Dania Tomlinson was involved in the adaptation of looms under the provisions of Meyer's earlier patent of 1897. Tomlinson stopped work and gave notice opposing the grant of a patent on the basis that the invention had already been patented in the United Kingdom under two prior applications.

When Tomlinson approached the Comptroller-General to oppose Meyer's patent, he asserted that he was merely a member of the public and that he had no interest in the patent. Under section 95 of the Patents, Designs, and Trade Marks Act 1883 (46 & 47 Vict. c. 57), the Comptroller was able to go to the Law Offices and present this case of "a man in the street", Tomlinson, who was applying in opposition of the granting of Meyer's patent, and whether he has a locus standi.

== Judgment ==
Smith LJ held that under Section 18 (4), the Law Officer was the final authority in deciding whether a person is entitled to be heard by the Comptroller or the Law Officer in opposition to a request for leave to amend a specification. A writ of prohibition against the Comptroller-General of Patents was refused on the grounds that the applicant had not shown that they were unable to obtain a hearing with the Comptroller on a specific point raised and that the decision of the Comptroller-General or the Law Officer was final.

On the issue of an interested person, Smith LJ held that the wording in Section 11 of the Act should be taken to mean "a person having an interest in the patent", and not just "any person" from whom their invention was taken.

== Significance ==
Smith LJ posed the question as to who can enter a nolle prosequi and stated that the attorney general (or their fiat) were "supreme in that matter". The judgment in this appeal makes it clear that the attorney general's unique power to stop legal proceedings is not reviewable by the courts.

... where a man who is tried for his life and convicted alleges that there is error on the record, he cannot take advantage of that error unless he obtains the fiat of the Attorney-General and no court in the kingdom has any controlling jurisdiction over him. That perhaps is the strongest case that can be put as to the position of the Attorney-General in exercising judicial functions.

— A. L. Smith LJ, R v Comptroller-General of Patents, ex parte Tomlinson [1899] 1 Q.B. 913–914
