= Peace (law) =

Common law concept of public order

The legal term peace, sometimes king's peace (Latin: pax regis) or queen's peace, is the common-law concept of the maintenance of public order.

The concept of the king's peace originated in Anglo-Saxon law, where it initially applied the special protections accorded to the households of the English kings and their retainers. A breach of the king's peace, which could be either a crime or a tort, was a serious matter. The concept of the king's peace expanded in the 10th and 11th centuries to accord the king's protection to particular times (such as holidays), places (such as highways and churches), and individuals (such as legates). By the time of the Norman Conquest, the notion of the king's peace became more general, referring to the safeguarding of public order more broadly. In subsequent centuries, those responsible for enforcing the king's peace (besides the king himself) included the King's Bench and various local officials, including the sheriff, coroner, justice of the peace, and constable.

In modern Britain, the police services are responsible for keeping the peace, a duty distinct from their duty of law enforcement. The concept has remained relevant in English law; in R v Secretary of State for the Home Department, ex parte Northumbria Police Authority (1989), the Court of Appeal for England and Wales held that the government could exercise prerogative powers to maintain the peace of the realm.

== In English law ==
=== Development in common law ===
==== Anglo-Saxon origins ====
The notion of "king's peace" originates in Anglo-Saxon law. Historian Bruce R. O'Brien notes that the concept was "a vague statement of the inviolability of the king or his palace" under the early English kings.

Maitland and Pollock describe the origins of the concept of the king's peace as arising from (1) "the special sanctity of the king's house" (the royal household or mund), "which may be regarded as differing only in degree from that which Germanic usage attached everywhere to the homestead of a free man"; and (2) "the special protection of the king's attendants and servants, and other persons who he thought fit to place on the same footing." Thus, Maitland and Pollock noted that "breach of the king's peace was an act of personal disobedience, and a much graver matter than an ordinary breach of the public order; it made the wrongdoer the king's enemy" who could be declared an outlaw.

Over time, the notion of king's peace expanded, particularly in the 10th and 11th centuries. The expansion of the concept coincided with the expansion of the king's household to encompass governmental institutions, including the chancery, exchequer, chamber, and royal courts of law. Under the reigns of Æthelred and Cnut, the concept of king's peace had already extended to designated times, places, individuals, and institutions. Individuals and institutions under the king's peace included legates, churches, and assemblies.

==== Following the Norman Conquest ====
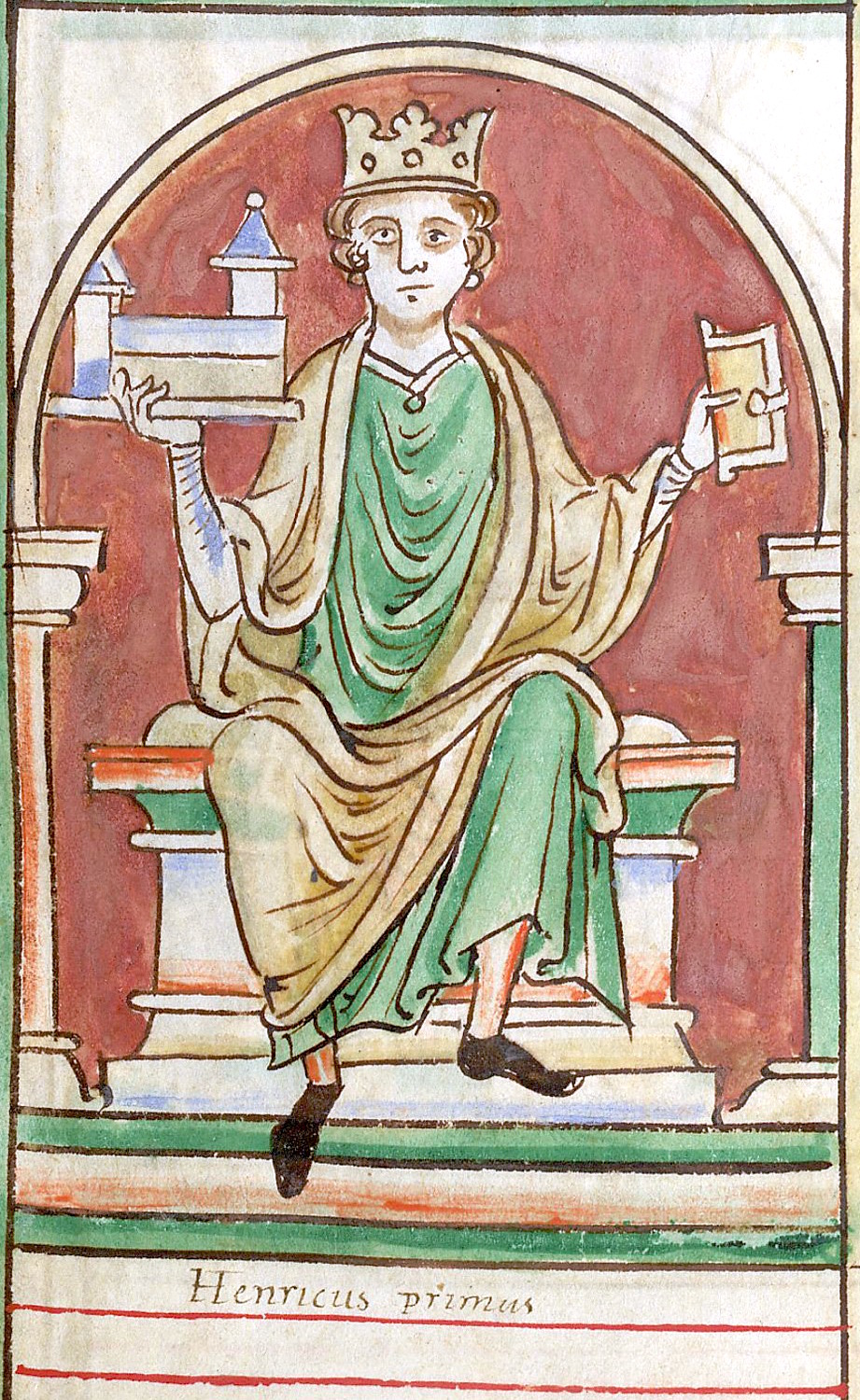
Henry I's coronation charter, issued in 1100, stated: "I establish a lasting peace throughout the whole of my kingdom and command that it henceforth be maintained."

Following the Norman Conquest, the "king's peace" had extended to refer to "the normal and general safeguard of public order" in the realm, although specially granted peaces continued to be given after this period. Under the Leges Edwardi Confessoris (Laws of Edward the Confessor), the four great highways of the realm (the Roman roads of Watling Street, Icknield Street, Ermine Street, and Fosse Way) as well as navigable rivers were also under the king's peace. The Leges Edwardi Confessoris provided that the weeks for Christmas, Easter, and Pentecost were under the king's peace as well. Maitland commented that the king's peace had begun to "swallow up lesser peaces" such as the peaces of local lords of the manor. For example, roads other than the four great Roman roads were formerly under the sheriffs' peace, but by the end of the 14th century had been brought under the king's peace.

A breach of the king's peace could be either a crime or a tort; one who breached the king's peace could be pursued by an appeal of felony or writ of trespass (brought by the victim of the breach) or by an indictment of felony or indictment of trespass (brought on behalf of the king, frequently at the request of the victim). One who breached the king's peace was subject to punishment for both the breach and for the underlying conduct, which could be in the form of a fine, forfeiture, imprisonment, corporal punishment, or capital punishment.

The Charter of Henry I, issued upon Henry's coronation in 1100, stated: "I establish a lasting peace throughout the whole of my kingdom and command that it henceforth be maintained." Historian John Hudson had commented that Henry I's cornational declaration of peace was non-specific, but did emphasize "the association of both the ideals and the practical enforcement of good order with firm kingship" as characterized by, among other things, an expansion of royal judicial activity. Hudson writes: "Thus the later precise legal notion of the king's peace may have developed more from ideas of the general king's peace, as manifest perhaps in shrieval grants and Henry's coronation decree, than from specific grants of royal protection."

The binding over power of magistrates, which was first codified in the Justices of the Peace Act 1361, has partial roots in the early use of sureties of the peace, which "emerged from the peace-keeping arrangements of Anglo-Saxon law, extended by the use of the royal prerogative and royal writs to bestow the king's peace where the king wished until the peace became a nationwide legal reality." (Note: In contrast to sureties of the peace, the separate device of sureties of good behaviour began "as a form of conditional pardon given by the king to malefactors"; Feldman writes that sureties of good behavior were "a special exercise of the king's power, not related to any national legal duty like preserving the peace.") Sureties of the peace were replaced in the 13th and 14th centuries, as the institutions of keeper of the peace and then justice of the peace were established. The 19th-century legal commentator James Fitzjames Stephen wrote that the conservators of the king's peace were the king, the great officers of state, and the King's Bench on the national level, and the sheriffs, coroners, justices of the peace, and constables on the local level.

==== Law of homicide ====
In traditional common law, a killing of a human was a murder only if the victim was "under the king's peace" (i.e., not an outlaw or an enemy soldier in wartime). This was predicated on the notion that, because the outlaw lived outside the king's peace, the king would not punish offenses against the outlaw. (Note: The 13th-century legal treatise Bracton stated that outlaws could be restored to "the peace" solely by the grace of the king.)

Historically, even homicides se defendendo (in self-defence) were considered offenses against the king, in that they deprived the king of the use of his subjects. As a result, killings in self-defence were treated as an excuse that required a royal pardon, rather than a justified act. Similarly, the maiming of a person was an offense against the king because it reduced "the value of a human resource, in this case, by rendering him incapable of military service."

=== Modern day ===
Today, the preservation of the King's Peace is the major responsibility of police services. Lord Scarman, in his report on the 1981 Brixton riot, defined the "Queen's Peace" as the maintenance of "the normal state of society" (i.e., a "state of public tranquility") and defined it as the first duty of a police officer, ahead of the second duty of enforcing the law. In a 2011 speech to the Police Foundation, Lord Judge (the Lord Chief Justice of England and Wales) said, "The concept Queen's Peace as it now is, unbreakably linked with the common law, is arguably the most cherished of all the ideas from our medieval past, still resonating in the modern world." He noted that the police officers take an oath to "cause the peace to be kept and preserved and prevent all offences against people and property."

In the controversial decision in R v Secretary of State for the Home Department, ex parte Northumbria Police Authority (1989), the Court of Appeal for England and Wales held that the Home Secretary could exercise prerogative powers to maintain the peace of the realm. The court thus ruled that the Home Secretary had the power to purchase crowd control devices, such as plastic bullets and CS gas, even without statutory authorization or the approval of the local police authority.

==== Breach of the peace ====
In modern English law, a breach of the peace is not itself a crime. (Note: In contrast, breach of the peace is a crime in Scots law.) However, "where a breach of the peace has been committed or, alternatively, where such a breach is reasonably believed to be imminent, a police officer, or for that matter a member of the public, has the power at common law to arrest without warrant the individual or individuals who have either committed or are about to commit that breach of the peace even though no offence has actually been committed." This is a form of preventive arrest. Under the Magistrates' Courts Act 1980, a magistrate has the power to "bind over" a person to keep the peace (i.e., to forfeit a sum of money upon a subsequent breach of the peace), and "refusal to be bound over to keep the peace is an offence in English law, punishable by up to six months' imprisonment." Moreover, the obstruction of an officer engaged in preventing a breach of the peace is a criminal offence.

The case R v Howell (1981) defined breach of the peace as "harm ... actually done or likely to be done to a person or, in his presence, his property or is put in fear of being harmed through an assault, affray, riot, unlawful assembly or other disturbance." In the 1998 case of Steel v UK, the European Court of Human Rights decided that this was a lawful restriction of the freedom of assembly under Article 5 and Article 11 of the European Convention on Human Rights.

== Medieval Scotland ==
Unlike medieval England, there is no strong evidence "for a strong conceptual and ideological royal peace" concept in medieval Scotland; however, historian Alan Harding argues that 12th-century royal brieves of protection issued by Scottish kings implicitly reflect the same concept. Historian Patrick Wormald suggests that Anglo-Saxon law and Scots law developed in parallel, and that the "seminal notion of vesting social security in the protection afforded by the king's peace" applied in both Scotland and England, with very early origins.

== Outside Britain ==
=== American law ===
After the American Revolution, American law merely adapted the common-law concept of the king's peace to refer to the maintenance of public order, and the concept of "an offense against the king's peace" to refer to an offense against the new sovereign—the people or the state. In the United States, the common law offense of breach of the peace was supplanted by the statutory offense of disturbing the peace. The separate offense of disorderly conduct has no common-law roots, but in most U.S. jurisdictions this offense "often is indistinguishable from" disturbing the peace. The application of criminal statutes on disturbing the peace and disorderly conduct have been limited by constitutional jurisprudence on the First Amendment, including the U.S. Supreme Court's rulings in Chaplinsky v. New Hampshire (1942) and Colten v. Kentucky (1972).

=== Australian law ===
As a common-law nation, the notion of "breach of the King's peace" endures in Australia. In the High Court of Australia decision Lipohar v R (1999), a decision dealing with jurisdiction to try a case for the common-law crime of conspiracy to defraud, Justices Gaudron, Gummow, and Hayne quoted a 1973 decision by the English judge Lord Wilberforce that "the common law treats certain actions as crimes" on the ground that the "actions in question are a threat to the Queen's peace, or, as we would now perhaps say, to society."

== Significance in historiography and history of crime ==
The concept of the king's peace is significant in the historiography of medieval England, particularly regarding the study of the origin of the idea of crime. Black's Law Dictionary defines the term as "the king's guarantee of peace and security of life and property to all within his protection." The notion of the king's peace is linked to the idea of police power and, more generally, sovereign power.

== See also ==
- History of the courts of England and Wales
- Peace of God
- Peacekeeping
- Vi et armis
- Verge (royal court)
