= Auditor General for Scotland =

Scottish public official

- Flag of Scotland
- Incumbent; Stephen Boyle since July 2020; 6 years ago
- Member of: Audit Scotland
- Reports to: Scottish Parliament
- Nominator: Scottish Parliament
- Appointer: The Monarch
- Term length: 8 years
- Constituting instrument: Scotland Act 1998
- Inaugural holder: Robert Black
- Formation: February 2000; 26 years ago
- Website: audit.scot/about-us/auditor-general

The auditor general for Scotland (AGS) is the public official in charge of the Audit Scotland, the body responsible for auditing most of Scottish public bodies, except local authorities. The auditor general oversees the scrutiny of how public money is spent by the directorates of the Scottish Government, government agencies, NHS Scotland, further education colleges and most Non Departmental Public Bodies. The current auditor general is Stephen Boyle.

== Overview ==
The auditor general is a statutory appointment made by the Crown, on the recommendation of the Scottish Parliament.

The post was created under section 69 of the Scotland Act 1998. The main functions of the AGS are set out under section 70 of the Scotland Act and further provided for under the Public Finance and Accountability (Scotland) Act 2000. The Police and Fire Reform (Scotland) Act 2012 legislated for mergers of some emergency service bodies, and also for the auditor general to become responsible for auditing the Scottish Police Authority, and the Scottish Fire and Rescue Service.

== Auditors ==
List of auditors general:

- Robert Black (February 2000 to July 2012)
- Caroline Gardner (July 2012 to July 2020)
- Stephen Boyle (July 2020 for 8-year term)

== See also ==
- Auditor general
- Comptroller
- Comptroller and Auditor General (United Kingdom)
- Auditor General for Wales
- Comptroller and Auditor General for Northern Ireland
