= Audit Scotland =

Scottish public auditing body

- Scottish Gaelic: Buidheann-sgrùdaidh na h-Alba
- Official logo of Audit Scotland

Independent public body overview
- Formed: 1 February 2000; 26 years ago
- Jurisdiction: Scottish Government
- Status: Active
- Headquarters: Edinburgh, Scotland
- Employees: Approx. 360
- Annual budget: £41.8 million (2026-27)
- Independent public body executives: Colin Crosby, Chair of the Board; Stephen Boyle, Auditor General for Scotland
- Website: audit.scot

Audit Scotland (Scottish Gaelic: Buidheann-sgrùdaidh na h-Alba) is an independent public body responsible for auditing most of Scotland's public organisations.

The organisation's head office is on West Port in Edinburgh's Old Town.

== Role ==
The body supports the Auditor General for Scotland and the Accounts Commission for Scotland in the audit of all public bodies in Scotland, including the Scottish Government, local councils and NHS Scotland.

It audits over 250 organisations, including:

- 81 central government bodies (Scottish Government, NDPB's, Police Scotland, Scottish Fire and Rescue Service, Scottish Water and others)
- 23 NHS bodies
- 32 local councils
- 22 further education colleges

== History ==
Audit Scotland was established as a corporate body on 1 February 2000 under the Public Finance and Accountability (Scotland) Act 2000, and commenced operations on 1 April 2000 following the transfer of staff and property from the Accounts Commission and the National Audit Office. As of 2026, it employees a staff of around 360 people.

The role of Audit Scotland is to provide the Auditor General for Scotland and the Accounts Commission for Scotland with the services they need to carry out their duties. The core work is to carry out:

- financial audits to help ensure that public sector bodies adhere to the highest standards of financial management and governance
- performance audits to help ensure that these bodies achieve the best possible value for money.

Stephen Boyle is the Auditor General for Scotland and the accountable officer for Audit Scotland. He started his term of office in July 2020.

The work of Audit Scotland is governed by a board which meets around four times a year: the audits are managed by a management team. The Public Audit and Post-legislative Scrutiny Committee of the Scottish Parliament examines Audit Scotland's proposals for the use of resources and expenditure, then reports to the Scottish Parliament.

== Audit quality and timeliness ==
In its 2025/26 annual report on public audit, it was reported that 45% of local government audits were completed by their target dates, while 79% had been completed by the end of 2025. The report recorded higher on-time completion rates for NHS audits (91%) and further education audits (90%). It also found that stakeholder perceptions of the quality and usefulness of annual audits and performance audit reports were generally positive.

== See also ==
- Scottish budget
- National Audit Office (United Kingdom)
- Northern Ireland Audit Office
- Audit Wales
