= Northern Ireland Audit Office =

Northern Irish public body

Agency overview
- Formed: 1987; 38 years ago
- Jurisdiction: Northern Ireland
- Status: Independent public body
- Headquarters: Belfast, Northern Ireland; 54°35′11″N 5°55′44″W
- Employees: 171 (2023/24)
- Agency executive: Dorinnia Carville, Comptroller and Auditor General for Northern Ireland
- Key document: Northern Ireland Act 1998

The Northern Ireland Audit Office (NIAO) is an independent public body which was established by the Parliament of the United Kingdom on 18 March 1987. It has overall responsibility for auditing on behalf of the Comptroller and Auditor General for Northern Ireland, across all sectors of government in Northern Ireland, except those reserved to the UK government.

== Function ==
Their aim is to ensure that the people of Northern Ireland know whether public money is being managed wisely and that public bodies in Northern Ireland understand how to improve outcomes.

This overall aim is supported by four key objectives:

- provide reasonable assurance that the financial statements audited by the Office give a true and fair view, have been prepared in accordance with the relevant accounting and other requirements and are in accordance with the authorities that govern them;
- identify, assess and examine risks to regularity, propriety and financial control in audited bodies and report on significant weaknesses; and
- provide audited bodies with constructive advice to help them improve their corporate governance, financial risk management control and reporting.

Northern Ireland Audit Office currently audits public bodies including the Northern Ireland Executive, local government and health and social care bodies.

== Structure ==
The Northern Ireland Audit Office takes the form of a statutory board, which employs staff, secures resources and monitors and advises the Comptroller and Auditor General. The Northern Ireland appoints the chair (the Comptroller and Auditor General). The Northern Ireland Audit Office is based in Belfast.

== History ==
On 18 March 1987, The Audit (Northern Ireland) Order 1987came into effect establishing an auditing body for Northern Ireland. The Northern Ireland Act 1998 transferred further powers to the Northern Ireland Audit Office.

In February 2024, a Northern Ireland Assembly committee was warned that the NIAO does not have sufficient funding to carry out all its functions going forward.

== Legislation ==
The Audit (Northern Ireland) Order 1987, the Northern Ireland Act 1998 and other legislation currently provide the statutory basis for the Auditor General and the auditors he appoints in local government to fulfill their purpose across the Northern Irish public sector.

== See also ==
- National Audit Office (United Kingdom)
- Audit Scotland
- Audit Wales
