= Accounts Commission for Scotland =

- Logo of the Accounts Commission for Scotland

Agency overview
- Formed: 1975
- Type: Executive non-departmental public body
- Jurisdiction: Scotland
- Headquarters: 102 West Port, Edinburgh
- Agency executives: William Moyes, Chair; Tim Mackay, Deputy Chair
- Website: audit.scot/about-us/accounts-commission

The Accounts Commission for Scotland is an executive non-departmental public body of the Scottish Government. The Commission audits Scottish local government and associated public bodies.

With the passing of the Public Finance and Accountability (Scotland) Act 2000 the Commission's staff were transferred to Audit Scotland, and it has not been allowed to incur costs. The board of the Commission is serviced by Audit Scotland staff, with expenses being covered by charging audited bodies.
