= Comptroller and Auditor General for Northern Ireland =

Northern Ireland public official

- Incumbent; Dorinnia Carville
- Northern Ireland Audit Office
- Seat: Belfast
- Appointer: The Crown on advice of the Northern Ireland Assembly
- Term length: At His Majesty's pleasure

The Comptroller and Auditor General for Northern Ireland (C&AG) is the public official in charge of the Northern Ireland Audit Office, the body responsible for auditing most of Northern Ireland's public bodies. The current auditor general is Dorinnia Carville.

== History and responsibilities ==
On 18 March 1987, The Audit (Northern Ireland) Order 1987 came into effect establishing an auditing body for Northern Ireland. The Northern Ireland Act 1998 transferred further powers to the Northern Ireland Audit Office.

== See also ==
- Auditor general
- Comptroller
- Comptroller and Auditor General (United Kingdom)
- Auditor General for Wales
- Auditor General for Scotland
