= United Kingdom constitutional law =

Law that constitutes the body politic of the United Kingdom

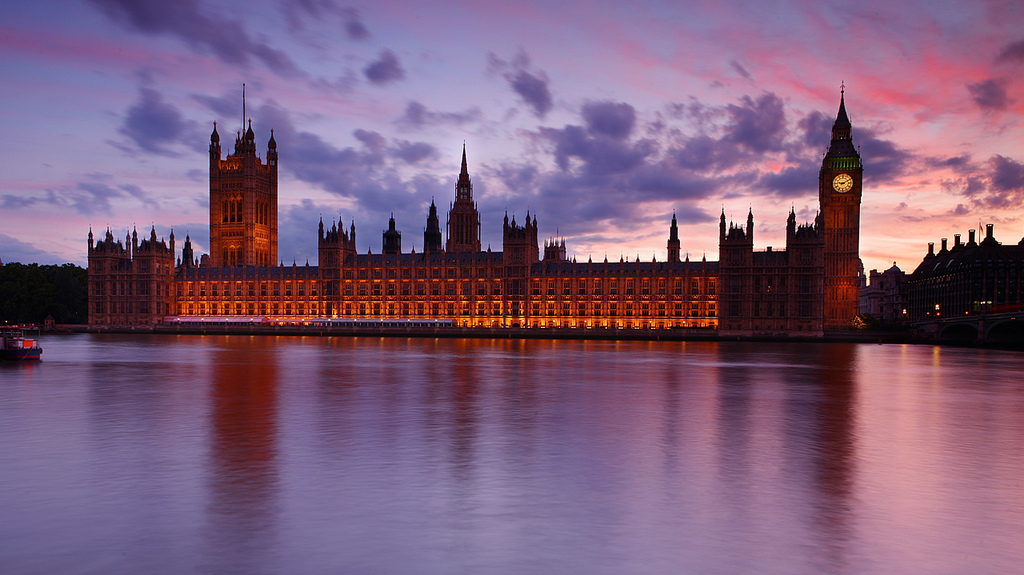
At the Palace of Westminster, Parliament crowns the UK's constitution. The House of Commons represents around 65 million people in 650 constituencies. The House of Lords is still unelected but can be overruled.

The United Kingdom constitutional law concerns the governance of the United Kingdom of Great Britain and Northern Ireland. With the oldest continuous political system on Earth, the British constitution is not contained in a single code but principles have emerged over centuries from common law statute, case law, political conventions and social consensus. In 1215, Magna Carta required the King to call "common counsel" or Parliament, hold courts in a fixed place, guarantee fair trials, guarantee free movement of people, free the church from the state, and it enshrined the rights of "common" people to use the land. After the English Civil War and the Glorious Revolution 1688, Parliament won supremacy over the monarch, the church and the courts, and the Bill of Rights 1689 recorded that the "election of members of Parliament ought to be free". The Act of Union 1707 (more correctly the Treaty of Union between England and Scotland, enacted by both states in their Parliaments) unified England, Wales and Scotland, while Ireland was joined in 1800, but the Republic of Ireland formally separated between 1916 and 1921 through bitter armed conflict. By the Representation of the People (Equal Franchise) Act 1928, almost every adult man and woman was finally entitled to vote for Parliament. The UK was a founding member of the International Labour Organization (ILO), the United Nations, the Commonwealth, the Council of Europe, and the World Trade Organization (WTO).

The constitutional principles of parliamentary sovereignty, the rule of law, democracy and internationalism guide the UK's modern political system. The central institutions of modern government are Parliament, the judiciary, the executive, the civil service and public bodies which implement policies, and regional and local governments. Parliament is composed of the House of Commons, elected by voter constituencies, and the House of Lords which is mostly appointed on the recommendation of cross-political party groups. To make a new Act of Parliament, the highest form of law, both Houses must read, amend, or approve proposed legislation three times. The judiciary is headed by a twelve-member Supreme Court. Underneath are the Court of Appeal for England and Wales, the Court of Appeal in Northern Ireland, and the Court of Session for Scotland. Below these lie a system of high courts, Crown courts, or tribunals depending on the subject in the case. Courts interpret statutes, progress the common law and principles of equity, and can control the discretion of the executive. While the courts may interpret the law, they have no power to declare an Act of Parliament unconstitutional. The executive is headed by the Prime Minister, who must command a majority in the House of Commons. The Prime Minister appoints a cabinet of people who lead each department, and form His Majesty's Government. The King himself is a ceremonial figurehead, who gives royal assent to new laws. By constitutional convention, the monarch does not usurp the democratic process and has not refused royal assent since the Scottish Militia Bill in 1708. Beyond the Parliament and cabinet, a civil service and a large number of public bodies, from the Department of Education to the National Health Service, deliver public services that implement the law and fulfil political, economic and social rights.

Most constitutional litigation occurs through administrative law disputes, on the operation of public bodies and human rights. The courts have an inherent power of judicial review, to ensure that every institution under law acts according to law. Except for Parliament itself, courts may declare acts of any institution or public figure void, to ensure that discretion is only used reasonably or proportionately. Since it joined the European Convention on Human Rights in 1950, and particularly after the Human Rights Act 1998, courts are required to review whether legislation is compatible with international human rights norms. These protect everyone's rights against government or corporate power, including liberty against arbitrary arrest and detention, the right to privacy against unlawful surveillance, the right to freedom of expression, freedom of association including joining trade unions and taking strike action, and the freedom of assembly and protest. Every public body, and private bodies that affect people's rights and freedoms, are accountable under the law.

== History ==
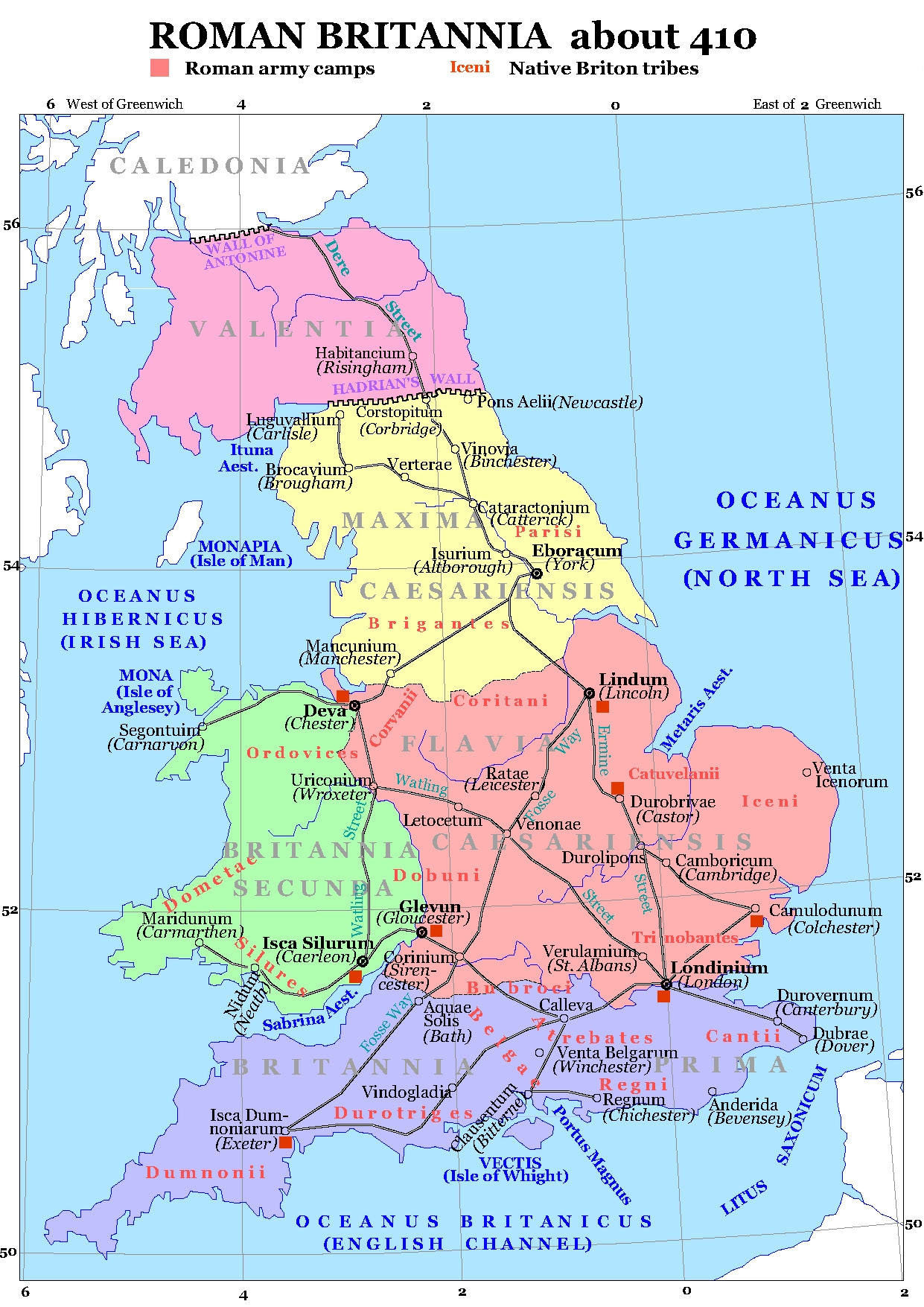
Roman Britain from 43 to 410 AD was governed under the Roman Constitution, subject to the Emperor.

The history of the UK constitution, though officially beginning in 1800, traces back to a time long before the four nations of England, Scotland, Wales and Ireland were fully formed. Before the Roman Empire's conquest, Britain and Ireland were populated by Celtic migrants from the European continent, but ones who left no recorded history of law. Near the end of the Roman Republic in 55 and 54 BC, the former Consul and legion commander Julius Caesar invaded Britain during the broader Gallic Wars. This did not establish permanent occupation, as Caesar returned to Rome, became dictator and was assassinated. The Republic was transformed into an Empire, when Caesar's heir Augustus took power in 27 BC. In the reign of Augustus' grandson, Claudius, Britain was conquered from 43 AD. Under Rome's uncodified constitution, Roman Britain was administered by a governor, usually member of the Senate but appointed by the Emperor for their military record. Londinium was a provincial capital of 60,000 people, and Britain a cosmopolitan society of around 3 million people. Roman law was based upon a slave economy, and highly militarised. Hadrian constructed a wall from 122 as part of the Empire's limits, but this was soon moved north by Antoninus Pius from 142. Constantine the Great was stationed in York in 306 when he left to claim his title to be Emperor. Constantine marched on Rome under the cross in 312, and issued an Edict of Milan in 313. This triggered a series of events where the Church assumed more and more power over the law. But under constant assault, the Empire began to collapse and Britain was abandoned in 407. Neither the Theodosian Code issued in 438, nor the great Corpus Juris Civilis of Justinian I in 534 entered the laws of Britain. In the Dark Ages, during power struggles between Anglo-Saxons, Britons, Danes and Vikings, kings convened regular councils, called the Witan, composed of lords and church leaders. But it was not until the Norman Invasion of 1066 that one common law was established through England under one monarch.

John Ball, a leader of the Peasants' Revolt of 1381 following repression after the Black Death, preached that "matters goeth not well to pass in England, nor shall not do till everything be common, and that there be no villains nor gentlemen, but that we may be all unied [sic] together, and that the lords be no greater masters than we be."

Under William the Conqueror, advised by a King's Council (Curia Regis), the Domesday Book was compiled in 1086 cataloguing all land and labour to levy taxes. Just 12 per cent of people were free, while the feudal system made others serfs, slaves or bordars and cottars. In 1190 Richard the Lionheart, more closely tied with the Pope in Rome, joined the Third Crusade to invade the Holy Land, but at great cost. Taxes levied by Richard I, and his successor King John to pay for the wars led to intense discontent, and the aristocracy forcing the King to sign Magna Carta. This was a commitment to hold 'common counsel' before any taxation, hold courts at a fixed place, hold trials according to law or before an accused's peers, guarantee free movement of people for trade, and give back common land. Failure to abide by Magna Carta led to the First Barons' war, and the popular legend of Robin Hood emerged: a returned crusader who robbed from the rich to give to the poor. The commitments on common land were soon recast in the Charter of the Forest 1217, signed at St Paul's by Henry III. These documents established that the monarch, even with apparent authority from God, was bound by law, and it remains 'the nearest approach to an irrepealable "fundamental statute" that England has ever had.' Throughout the Middle Ages, common land was a source of welfare for common people, peasant labourers bound by a feudal system of control. In 1348, the Black Death struck England, and killed around a third of the population. As peasants lost their lords, and there was a shortage of workers, wages rose. The King and Parliament responded with the Statute of Labourers 1351 to freeze wage rises. This led to the Peasants' Revolt of 1381, where leaders demanded an end to feudalism, and for everything to be held in common. Despite the revolt's violent repression, slavery and serfdom broke down, yet most people remained without any substantial liberty, in political or economic rights. As sheep farming became more profitable than agricultural work, enclosures of common land dispossessed more people, who turned into paupers and were punished. Under Henry VIII, to seal a divorce from Catherine of Aragon and marry Anne Boleyn (who he soon beheaded for supposed infidelity), the Church of England was declared separate from Rome in the Act of Supremacy 1534, with the King as the head. The Law in Wales Act 1535 united Wales and England in one administrative system, while the King became ever more despotic, executing the Lord Chancellor, Sir Thomas More in 1535, and dissolving the monasteries and murdering those who resisted. After Henry VIII died, and power struggles following the death of his boy Edward VI at age 15, Elizabeth I, the daughter of Henry VIII and Anne Boleyn, took the throne in 1558. Half a century of prosperity followed as Elizabeth I avoided wars, but founded corporations including the East India Company to monopolise trade routes. Under her successor, James I, further companies were created to colonise North America, including the London Company and the Virginia Company in 1606, and the Massachusetts Bay Company in 1628. Many religious dissidents left England to settle the new world.

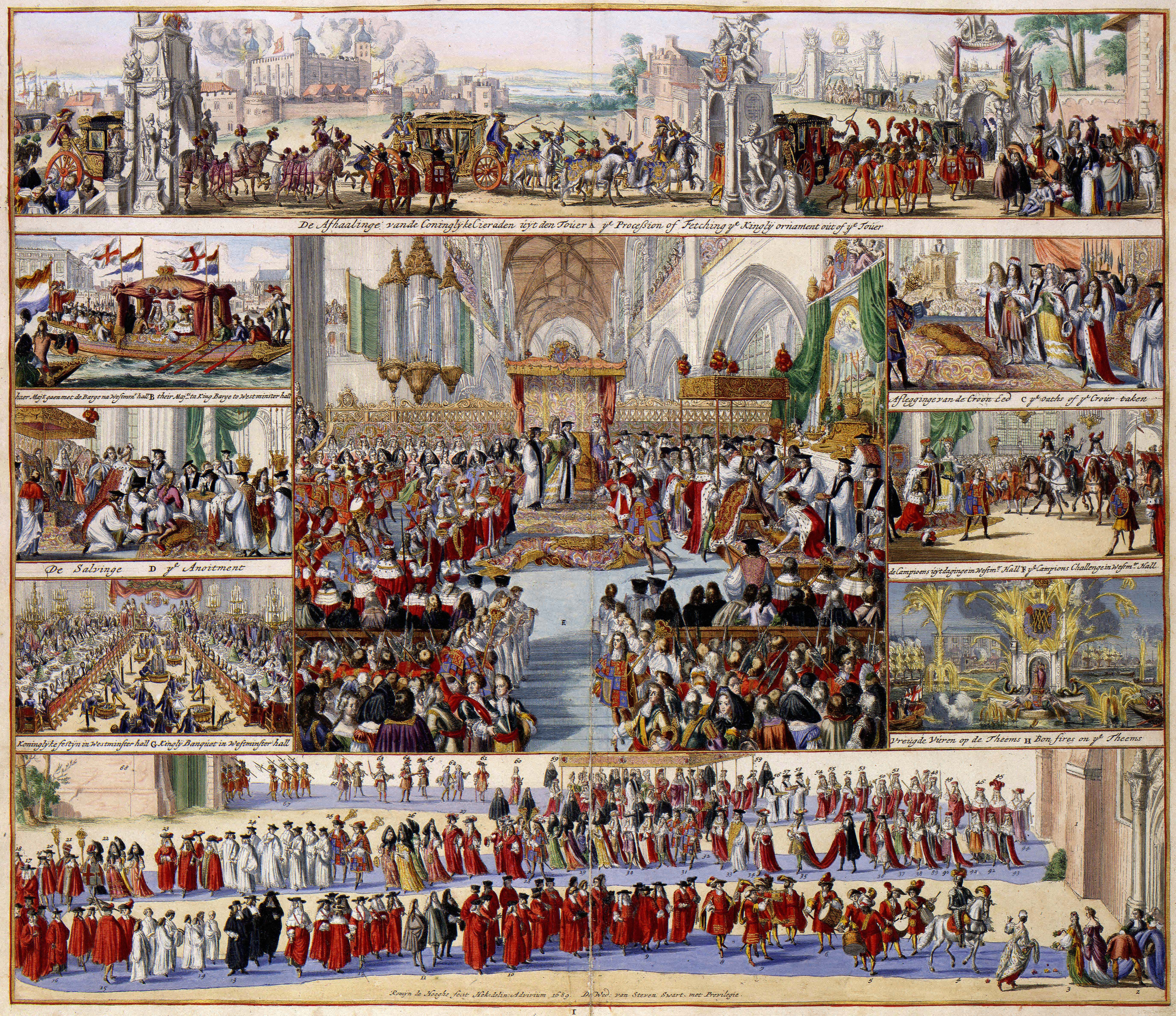
The Glorious Revolution of 1688 confirmed Parliament's supremacy over the monarch, represented by John Locke's Second Treatise on Government (1689). This laid the foundations for a peaceful unification of England and Scotland in the Act of Union 1707.

While Elizabeth I maintained a Protestant church, under her successor James, who unified the Scottish and English Crowns, religious and political tensions grew as he asserted a divine right of Kings. This prompted a series of cases from Sir Edward Coke, the Chief Justice of the Common Pleas and then King's Bench courts, which denied that the King could pass judgment in legal proceedings, and held that the royal prerogative was subject to the law and cannot be expanded. Coke CJ went even further in Dr Bonham's case, holding that even that "the common law will control Acts of Parliament". Though supported by some judges, the idea that common law courts could nullify Acts of Parliament was rejected, and the common law was formally placed under the King's control in the Earl of Oxford's case, establishing that equity (then administered by the Lord Chancellor in the House of Lords) was above common law. Coke fell from favour, (Note: Compounded by a ruling in Peacham's Case (1614) that held it would not be treason to advocate the King's death.) and was removed from judicial office. When Charles I succeeded to the throne in 1625, and more fervently asserted a divine right, including the ability to levy tax without Parliament, Coke and others presented the Petition of Right 1628. This demanded the King to abide by Magna Carta, levy no tax without Parliament, not arbitrarily commit people to prison, not have martial law in times of peace, and not billet soldiers in private homes. Charles I responded by shutting down or proroguing Parliament and taxing trade (or "ship money") without authority. The country descended into the English Civil War in 1642 culminating in the capture and execution of King Charles I on Whitehall in 1649 by the New Model Army led by Oliver Cromwell. Cromwell, not wishing to become a king, became a de facto dictator. After his death, the monarchy was restored with Charles II in 1660, but his successor James II again attempted to assert divine right to rule. In 1688, Parliament 'invited' a replacement King and Queen, William and Mary of Orange, and after a brief conflict forced James II out. Known as the Glorious Revolution, Parliament proclaimed a new Bill of Rights 1689, with a Claim of Right Act 1689 in Scotland, that cemented parliamentary sovereignty. As well as reaffirming Magna Carta, it says the 'pretended power of suspending laws or the execution of laws by regal authority without consent of Parliament is illegal', that 'election of members of Parliament ought to be free', and that 'Parliament ought to be held frequently'. The justification for government itself, encapsulated by John Locke in his Second Treatise on Government was the protection of people's rights: "lives, liberties and estates."

The British Empire ended after WW2 as countries, where democracy and freedom were suppressed, demanded independence. The Commonwealth is now open to any country committed to peace, liberty, equality, and development, as in the Harare Declaration of 1991.

With parliamentary sovereignty as the cornerstone of the new constitution, Parliament proceeded to set up a system of finance in the Bank of England Act 1694 and the Act of Settlement 1700 created an independent system of justice: judges were salaried and could not be removed except by both Houses of Parliament, no member of the House of Commons could be paid by the Crown, and the Crown had to be Anglican. In 1703, Ashby v White established that the right to vote was a constitutional right. The Act of Union 1707 formally joined the parliaments of England and Scotland, by giving Scottish electors representation in Westminster. The new union was soon faced with disaster as in the War of the Spanish Succession, the Spanish promised the right for British ships to trade (mostly slaves) in the seas around South America. The South Sea Company, duly incorporated to monopolise trade routes, became the object of mass financial speculation, provoked by government ministers interested in its rising share price. When it transpired, contrary to promoters' stories, that no trade was done because the Spanish had revoked their promise the stock market crashed, driving economic chaos. This was made worse by the decision of conservative politicians to endorse the company to take over the national debt as an alternative financier to the government over the Whig dominated Bank of England. The result of the crash was that the Chancellor of the Exchequer was imprisoned in the Tower of London for his corruption, the Postmaster General committed suicide, and the disgraced Lord Chancellor was replaced with Lord King LC who promptly ruled that people in a position of trust must avoid any possibility of a conflict of interest. Out of the chaos, Robert Walpole emerged as a stable political figure who for 21 years held a majority of the House of Commons, and is now considered the first "Prime Minister". In 1765, Entick v Carrington established that the government could do nothing but that which was empowered by law, while the first teacher of English law, William Blackstone represented the standard view in his Commentaries on the Laws of England that slavery was unlawful and that "the spirit of liberty is so deeply ingrained in our constitution" any person enslaved in England must be freed. However, the transatlantic slave trade had accelerated to North American colonies. In 1772, when Lord Mansfield ruled in Somerset v Stewart that slavery was unlawful at common law, this set off a wave of outrage in southern, enslavement colonies of America. Together with northern colonies grievances over taxation without representation, this led to the American Revolution and Declaration of Independence in 1776. The British military failed to hold control. Instead, it began settling Australia from 1788. In 1789, the French Revolution broke out, and the King was deposed with demands for "liberty, equality and fraternity". The British aristocracy reacted with repression on free speech and association to forestall any similar movement. While figures like Jeremy Bentham called natural rights "nonsense upon stilts", Mary Wollstonecraft called for A Vindication of the Rights of Woman as well as men, arguing that unjust gender and class oppression flowed from "the respect paid to property... as from a poisoned fountain". While successful in the Napoleonic Wars in defeating France, and cementing union with Ireland in the Act of Union 1800, liberty, freedom and democracy were scarcely protected in the new "United Kingdom".

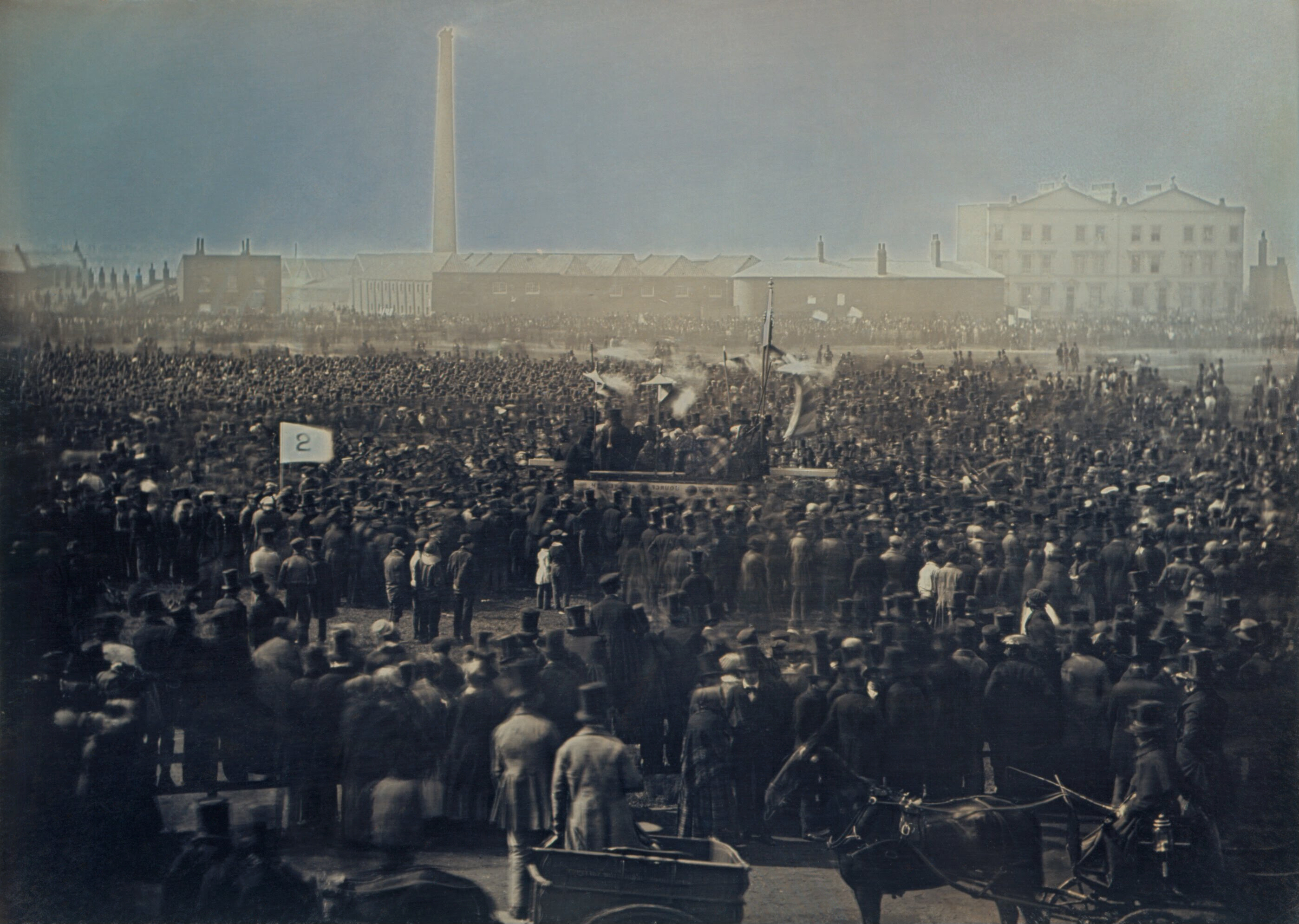
To demand democratic reform, the Chartists met on Kennington Common during the Revolutions of 1848.

During this time, with the invention of the steam engine the Industrial Revolution had begun. Poverty had also accelerated through the Speenhamland system of poor laws by subsidising employers and landowners with parish rates. The Corn Laws from 1815 further impoverished people by fixing prices to maintain landowner profits. While the Great Reform Act 1832 extended the vote slightly, only those with property had any representation in Parliament. Although the Slavery Abolition Act 1833 abolished the slave trade within the British Empire, it only compensated slave owners and made ex-slaves in colonies pay off debts for their freedom for decades after. With the Poor Law Amendment Act 1834, further punishment for poverty was inflicted as people were put into workhouses if found to be unemployed. In R v Lovelass a group of agricultural workers who formed a trade union were prosecuted and sentenced to be transported to Australia under the Unlawful Oaths Act 1797, triggering mass protests. A movement called Chartism grew demanding the right to vote for everyone in free and fair elections. As the great famine hit Ireland and millions migrated to the United States, Chartists staged a mass march from Kennington Common to Parliament in 1848 as revolutions broke out across Europe, and the Communist Manifesto was drafted by German revolutionary Karl Marx and Manchester factory owner Friedrich Engels. While the Crimean War distracted from social reform and Viscount Palmerston opposed anything, the American Civil War of 1860 to 1865 ended slavery in the US, and the UK gradually enabled greater political freedom. In the Second Reform Act 1867 more middle-class property owners were enfranchised, the Elementary Education Act 1870 provided free primary school, and the Trade Union Act 1871 enabled free association without criminal penalty. The Representation of the People Act 1884 reduced the property qualification further, so that around one third of men could vote. Still, outside the UK, liberty and the right to vote were violently repressed across the vast British Empire, in Africa, India, Asia and the Caribbean.

From the start of the 20th century, the UK underwent vast social and constitutional change, beginning with an attempt by the House of Lords to suppress trade union freedom. In response, the labour movement organised to support representatives in Parliament, and in the 1906 general election won 29 seats and supported the Liberal Party's programme of reform. This included a legal guarantee of the right of unions to collectively bargain and strike for fair wages, an old-age pension, a system of minimum wages, a People's Budget with higher taxes on the wealthy to fund spending. After a further election brought by the House of Lords blocking reform, Parliament pass a National Insurance system for welfare, and the Parliament Act 1911 prevented the House of Lords blocking legislation for more than two years, and removed the right to delay any money bills. Despite this, the Liberal government, against the opposition of Labour, armed for and entered World War I. At the end of the War, with millions dead, Parliament passed the Representation of the People Act 1918 which enabled every adult male the vote, although it was only after the mass protest of the Suffragettes that the Representation of the People (Equal Franchise) Act 1928 enabled all women to vote, and that the UK became democratic. The War also triggered uprising in Ireland, and an Irish War of Independence leading to the partition of the island between the Republic of Ireland in the south and Northern Ireland in the Government of Ireland Act 1920. The Versailles Treaty at the end of the War demanded German reparations, beggaring the country through the 1920s and upon the Great Depression leading to a fascist collapse under Hitler.

The failed international law system, after World War II was replaced with the United Nations where the UK held a permanent seat on the UN Security Council. However the British Empire began to crumble as India and nations across Africa fought for democracy, human rights, and independence. To prevent any recurrence of the Holocaust and war, the Council of Europe was established to draft the European Convention on Human Rights in 1950. Further, it was seen that the only way to prevent conflict was through economic integration. The European Economic Community, which became the European Union in 1992, was supported by Winston Churchill with the UK to be "at the centre", although it did not enter until the European Communities Act 1972. Under Margaret Thatcher, significant cuts were made to public services, labour rights, and the powers of local government, including abolishing the Greater London Council. However, some powers were restored with extensive devolution of power in the Scotland Act 1998, Northern Ireland Act 1998, Greater London Authority Act 1999 and the Government of Wales Act 2006. After many years of armed conflict in Northern Ireland, the Good Friday Agreement of 1998 brought peace. The Human Rights Act 1998 empowered courts to apply Convention rights without the need for claimants to take cases to the Strasbourg court. The House of Lords Act 1999 reduced but did not fully eliminate hereditary peers. Since the 2008 financial crisis brought about by bankers' speculation, a Conservative and Liberal Democrat coalition launched a programme of "austerity" cuts, and cemented their term in the Fixed-term Parliaments Act 2011. After 2015, however, early elections were held anyway in 2017, following a referendum on EU membership that resulted in 51.9 per cent of people favouring to leave, and 48.1 per cent of voters favouring to remain. The United Kingdom formally left the European Union on 31 January 2020.

== Principles ==
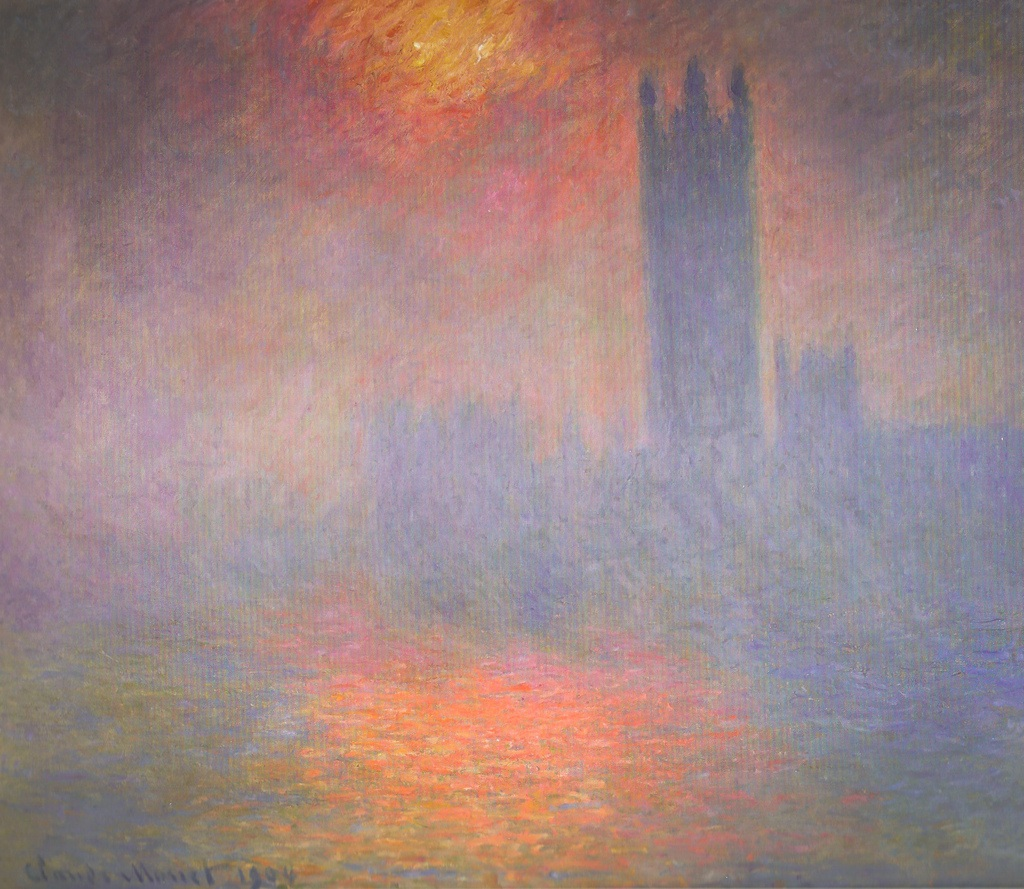
In French, parler means "to talk", and the old French developed into the English word "Parliament", painted by Claude Monet in 1904. Though not codified, the UK's constitution is written in hundreds of Acts of Parliament, court cases, and in documented conventions. Its essential principles, though continually evolving, are Parliamentary sovereignty, the rule of law, democracy and internationalism.

The British constitution has not been codified in one document, like the Constitution of South Africa or the Grundgesetz in Germany. However, general constitutional principles run through the law and the Supreme Court has said that "[the UK constitution] includes numerous principles of law, which are enforceable by the courts in the same way as other legal principles. In giving them effect, the courts have the responsibility of upholding the values and principles of our constitution and making them effective." Central statutes have been recognised as holding "constitutional" value. The main sources of law, which "constitute" the body politic of the UK, are Acts of Parliament, cases decided by courts, and conventions on how the Cabinet, the Prime Minister, Parliament and the Monarch conduct themselves. Through legislation, case law and conventions, at least four main principles are usually recognised. First, parliamentary sovereignty is a foundational principle. Through the English Reformation, the Civil War, the Glorious Revolution of 1689 and the Act of the Union 1707, Parliament became the dominant source of law, above the judiciary, executive, monarchy, and church. Parliamentary sovereignty means Parliament can make or unmake any law within its practical power to do so, a fact that is usually justified by Parliament upholding other principles, namely the rule of law, democracy, and internationalism. Second, the rule of law has run through the constitution since Magna Carta and the Petition of Right 1628. This means the government may only conduct itself according to legal authority, including respect for human rights. Third, at least since 1928, democracy has become a fundamental constitutional principle. Originally only wealthy, property-owning men held rights to vote for the House of Commons, while the king or queen, and/or a hereditary House of Lords, dominated politics. But from 1832 adult citizens slowly won the right to universal suffrage. Fourth, the British constitution is international: Parliament has consistently augmented its sovereignty and the practical power of British citizens through membership of international bodies, including the International Labour Organization, the United Nations, the European Convention on Human Rights, the European Union, the World Trade Organization, and the International Criminal Court. EU membership was challenged by the 2016 United Kingdom European Union membership referendum, and after the 2019 general election Parliament determined to leave.

=== Parliamentary sovereignty ===
Parliamentary sovereignty is often seen as a central element in the British constitution, although its extent is contested. It means that an Act of Parliament is the highest form of law, and also that "Parliament cannot bind itself." Historically, Parliament became sovereign through a series of power struggles between the monarch, the church, the courts, and ordinary people. Magna Carta, which was later annulled leading to the First Barons' War, granted the right of Parliament to exist for "common counsel" before any tax, against the supposedly "divine right of kings" to rule. Common land was also guaranteed to people to farm, graze, hunt or fish, though aristocrats continued to dominate politics. In the Act of Supremacy 1534, King Henry VIII asserted his divine right over the Catholic Church in Rome, declaring himself the supreme leader of the Church of England. Then in the Earl of Oxford's case in 1615, the Lord Chancellor (both the King's representative and head of the judiciary) asserted the supremacy of the Court of Chancery over the common law courts, effectively nullifying Sir Edward Coke's assertion that judges could declare statutes void if they went "against common right and reason". Finally, after the Glorious Revolution of 1688, the Bill of Rights 1689 placed Parliament's power over the monarch (and therefore over the church and courts). Parliament became the "sovereign", and supreme. But power struggles within Parliament continued between the aristocracy and common people. People from the Chartists, to the trade unions fought for the vote in the House of Commons, and finally in the Parliament Act 1911 and Parliament Act 1949 for the Commons to prevail in any conflict over the unelected House of Lords: after 1949, the Lords could only delay legislation by one year, and not delay any budgetary measure over a month. In R (Jackson) v Attorney General, a group of pro-hunting protestors challenged the Hunting Act 2004, arguing it was not valid and could not ban fox hunting, because it was passed avoiding the House of Lords under the Parliament Act 1949, and this was itself invalid, because it was passed using the power in the Parliament Act 1911 to override the Lords in two years and limited the Lords' power of delay to one year. But the Parliament Act 1911 could not be used to amend its own limitation of the Lords power, argued the claimants. It had to be implicitly limited in scope. The House of Lords rejected this argument, holding both the Parliament Act 1949 and the Hunting Act 2004 to be completely valid. However, in obiter dicta Lord Hope did argue that the "rule of law enforced by the courts is the ultimate controlling factor on which our constitution is based", that Parliamentary sovereignty "is no longer, if it ever was, absolute", it cannot be used to defend unconstitutional Acts (as determined by the courts). There remains no settled meaning of "Parliamentary sovereignty", except that it depends upon the principle of representative democracy, and its legal force depends on political legitimacy.

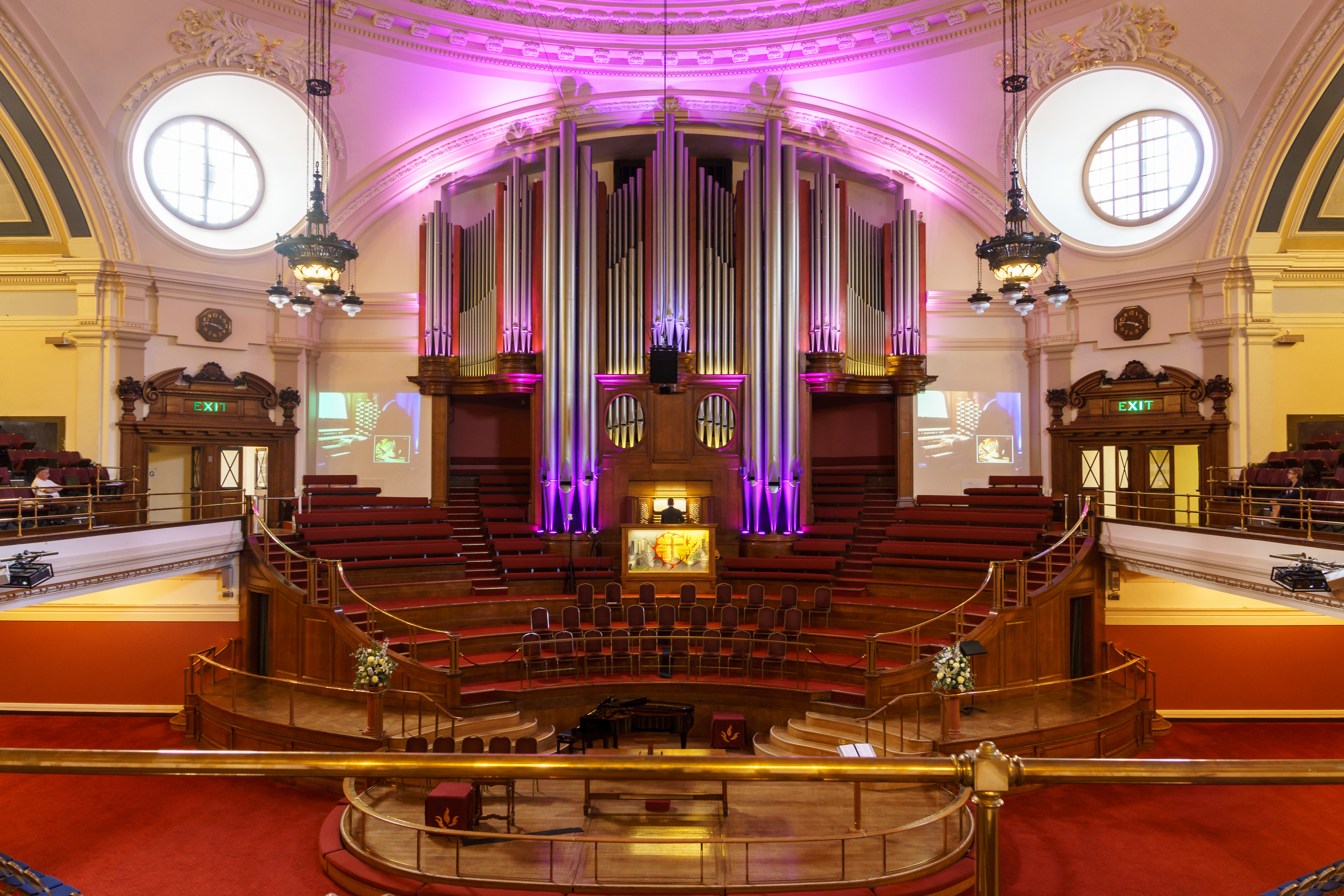
The UK has committed to international law as a "sovereign" member, to augment its power through cooperation, in the United Nations since 1945. The first UN General Assembly was held at Methodist Central Hall, opened by Prime Minister Clement Attlee.

In recent history, four main factors have developed Parliament's sovereignty in practical and legal terms. First, since 1945 international cooperation meant Parliament has augmented its power by working with other sovereign nations, rather than trying to dominate them. The British Empire, which once colonised a quarter of the world's population and a third of its land, was weakened by World War I, and disintegrated after World War II. While the UK's military power before had been largely uncontested, and so was thought by writers of the Imperial period to be able to "make or unmake any law whatever", the UK chose to join in the League of Nations in 1919, and after its failure, the United Nations 1945 to rebuild a system of international law. The Versailles Treaty 1919, in the lasting part that established the International Labour Organization, recalled that "peace can only be established if it is based upon social justice". The UN Charter, which was "based on the principle of the sovereign equality of all its Members", said that "to save succeeding generations from the scourge of war, which twice in our lifetime has brought untold sorrow to mankind", the UN would "reaffirm faith in fundamental human rights", and members should "live together in peace with one another as good neighbours". The Bretton Woods Agreements Act 1945, United Nations Act 1946 and the International Organisations Act 1968 wrote the UK's funding and membership of the United Nations, the International Monetary Fund, the World Bank, and other bodies, into statute. For example, the UK bound itself to implement by order UN Security Council resolutions, up to the actual use of force, in return for representation in the General Assembly and Security Council. Although isolated British governments have infringed international law before, the United Kingdom has always accepted a formal duty that its sovereignty would not be used unlawfully. Second, in 1950 the UK helped to write and join the European Convention on Human Rights. While that convention reflected norms and cases decided under British statutes and the common law on civil liberties, (Note: For instance, preceding art. 8 of that convention, see Entick v Carrington [1765] EWHC KB J98. On Article 11, see Crofter Hand Woven Harris Tweed Co Ltd v Veitch [1941] UKHL 2, but note the severe limitations of judicial clarity, apparent in Malone v UK [1984] ECHR 10 and Wilson v United Kingdom [2002] ECHR 552.) the UK accepted that people could appeal to the European Court of Human Rights in Strasbourg, if domestic remedies were insufficient. In the Human Rights Act 1998, Parliament decided that the British judiciary should be both empowered and required to apply human rights norms directly in determining British cases, to ensure a more speedy, human rights-based resolution to case law, and effectively to influence human rights reasoning more by "bringing rights home".

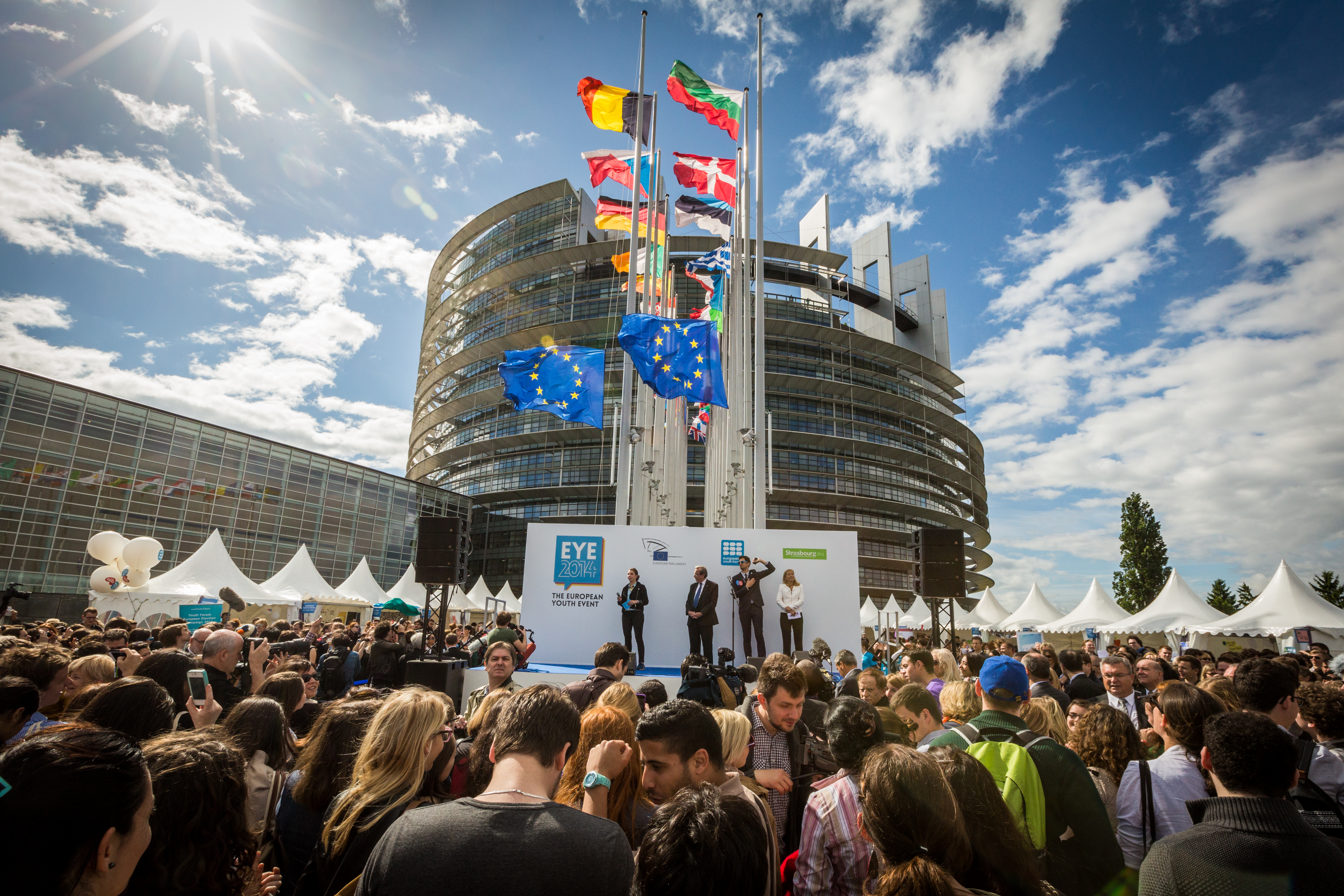
The UK was a European Union member, which commits to "human dignity, freedom, democracy, equality, the rule of law and respect for human rights". Winston Churchill had called for a United States of Europe and for the UK to be "at the centre". The Brexit poll of 2016 demanded by Conservative backbenchers and supported by 51.89% of UK voters called the UK's EU membership into question.

Third, the UK became a member of the European Union after the European Communities Act 1972 and through its ratification of the Maastricht Treaty in 1992. The idea of a Union had long been envisaged by European leaders, including Winston Churchill, who in 1946 had called for a "United States of Europe" with the UK "at the centre". EU law has always been held to prevail in any conflict between member state laws for the limited fields in which it operates, but member states and citizens gain control over the scope and content of EU law, and so extend their sovereignty in international affairs, through joint representation in the European Parliament, Council of Ministers, and the Commission. This means that, as the UK is a member of the club, it voluntarily agrees to play by the club's rules. This principle was tested in R (Factortame Ltd) v SS for Transport, where a fishing business claimed that it should not be required to have 75% of British shareholders, as the Merchant Shipping Act 1988 said. Under EU law, the principle of freedom of establishment states that nationals of any member state can freely incorporate and run a business across the EU without unjustified interference. The House of Lords held that, because the EU law conflicted with the sections of the 1988 Act, those sections would not be enforced, and disapplied, because Parliament had not clearly expressed an intention to renounce the 1972 Act. According to Lord Bridge "whatever limitation of its sovereignty Parliament accepted when it enacted the [1972 Act] was entirely voluntary". It is, therefore, the courts' duty, until Parliament expresses a clear will to leave the EU on certain terms, to apply EU law. On the other hand, in R (HS2 Action Alliance Limited) v Secretary of State for Transport the Supreme Court held that certain fundamental principles of British constitutional law would not be interpreted by the courts as having been given up by membership of the EU, or probably any international organisation. Here a group protesting against the High Speed 2 rail line from London to Manchester and Leeds claimed that the government had not properly followed the Environmental Impact Assessment Directive 2011 by whipping a vote in Parliament to approve the plan. They argued that the Directive required open and free consultation, a requirement not fulfilled if a party whip compelled party members to vote. The Supreme Court unanimously held the Directive did not prevent a party whip. But if a conflict had existed, a Directive could not compromise the fundamental constitutional principle from the Bill of Rights 1689 that Parliament is free to organise its affairs. In this respect, EU law could not override fundamental principles of the UK's law.

Fourth, devolution in the United Kingdom has meant Parliament gave power to legislate on specific topics to nations and regions: the Scotland Act 1998 created the Scottish Parliament, the Government of Wales Act 1998 created the Welsh Assembly, and the Northern Ireland Act 1998 created a Northern Ireland Executive following the historic Good Friday Agreement, to bring peace. In addition, the Local Government Act 1972 and the Greater London Authority Act 1999 gives more limited powers to local and London governments. Constitutionally, it has become increasingly accepted that decisions should not be taken for the UK which would override, and run counter to the will of regional governments. However, in Miller v Secretary of State for Exiting the EU, a group of people who sought to remain in the European Union brought the government on whether the Prime Minister could trigger Article 50 to notify the European Commission of the UK's intention to leave, without an Act of Parliament. This followed the Brexit poll of 2016 where 51.9% (of those voting) voted to leave on uncertain terms, comprising 27% of the British population. The claimants argued that, because "Brexit" would obliterate rights that Parliament had conferred through Acts (e.g. the right of free movement of British citizens in the EU, the right to fair competition through merger control, or the right to vote for EU institutions) only Parliament could consent to notifying the intention to negotiate to leave under Article 50. They also argued that the Sewel Convention for devolved assemblies, where the assembly passes a motion that the Westminster Parliament can legislate on a devolved matter before it does so, meant the UK could not negotiate to leave without the Scottish or Northern Ireland legislatures' consent. The Supreme Court held that Parliament must pass an Act, and could not begin the process of leaving purely through royal prerogative powers. However, the Sewel convention could not be enforced by courts, rather than observed. This led Prime Minister Theresa May to procure the European Union (Notification of Withdrawal) Act 2017, giving her power to notify the intention to negotiate to leave the EU. It remains unclear that the United Kingdom, or Parliament's sovereignty, will survive if EU membership is eventually given up.

It is sometimes the case that parliament pass laws that may be at odds with existing law. In some circumstances new legislation may impliedly repeal parts of existing legislation with courts behaving as though parts of the old legislation at odds with the new legislation have been repealed. However, parliamentary and court behaviour (notably Thoburn v Sunderland City Council) has suggested the existence of "constitutional legislation" which government must expressly repeal or amend certain pieces of constitutional legislation for the new legislation at odds with the constitutional legislation to apply.

=== Rule of law ===
The rule of law has been regarded as a fundamental principle of modern legal systems, including the UK. It has been called "as important in a free society as the democratic franchise", and even "the ultimate controlling factor on which our constitution is based", but like parliamentary sovereignty, its meaning and extent is disputed. The most widely accepted meanings speak of several factors: Lord Bingham, formerly the highest judge in the UK, suggested the rule of law ought to mean that law is clear and predictable, not subject to broad or unreasonable discretion, applies equally to all people, with speedy and fair procedures for enforcement, protects fundamental human rights, and works according to international law. Other definitions seek to exclude human rights and international law as relevant, but largely stem from visions of pre-democratic scholars such as Albert Venn Dicey. The rule of law was explicitly recognised as a "constitutional principle" in section 1 of the Constitutional Reform Act 2005, which limited the judicial role of the Lord Chancellor and recast the judicial appointments system to entrench independence, diversity and merit. As statute gives no further definition, the practical meaning of the "rule of law" develops through case law.

The European Court of Human Rights, following common law principles, protects the rule of law by requiring people's liberty, privacy or other rights are not infringed by the government unless there is a clear legal basis and justification.

At the core of the rule of law, in English and British law, has traditionally been the principle of "legality". This means that the state, government, and any person acting under government authority (including a corporation), may only act according to law. In 1765, in Entick v Carrington a writer, John Entick, claimed that the King's Chief Messenger, Nathan Carrington, had no legal authority to break into and ransack his home, and remove his papers. Carrington claimed he had authority from the Secretary of State, Lord Halifax who issued a search "warrant", but there was no statute that gave Lord Halifax the authority to issue search warrants. Lord Camden CJ held that the "great end, for which men entered into society, was to secure their property", and that without any authority "every invasion of private property, be it ever so minute, is a trespass." Carrington acted unlawfully and had to pay damages. Today this principle of legality is found throughout the European Convention on Human Rights, which enables infringements of rights as a starting point only if "in accordance with the law". For example, in 1979, in Malone v Metropolitan Police Commissioner a man charged with handling stolen goods claimed the police unlawfully tapped his phone, to get evidence. The only related statute, the Post Office Act 1969 Schedule 5, stated there should be no interference in telecommunications unless the Secretary of State issued a warrant, but said nothing explicit about phone tapping. Megarry VC held there was no wrong at common law, and refused to interpret the statute in light of the right to privacy under the European Convention on Human Rights, article 8. On appeal, the European Court of Human Rights concluded the Convention was breached because the statute did not 'indicate with reasonable clarity the scope and manner of exercise of the relevant discretion conferred on the public authorities.' The judgment, however, was overshadowed by the government swiftly passing a new Act to authorise phone tapping with a warrant. By itself, the principle of legality is not enough to alone preserve human rights in the face of ever more intrusive statutory powers of surveillance by corporations or government.

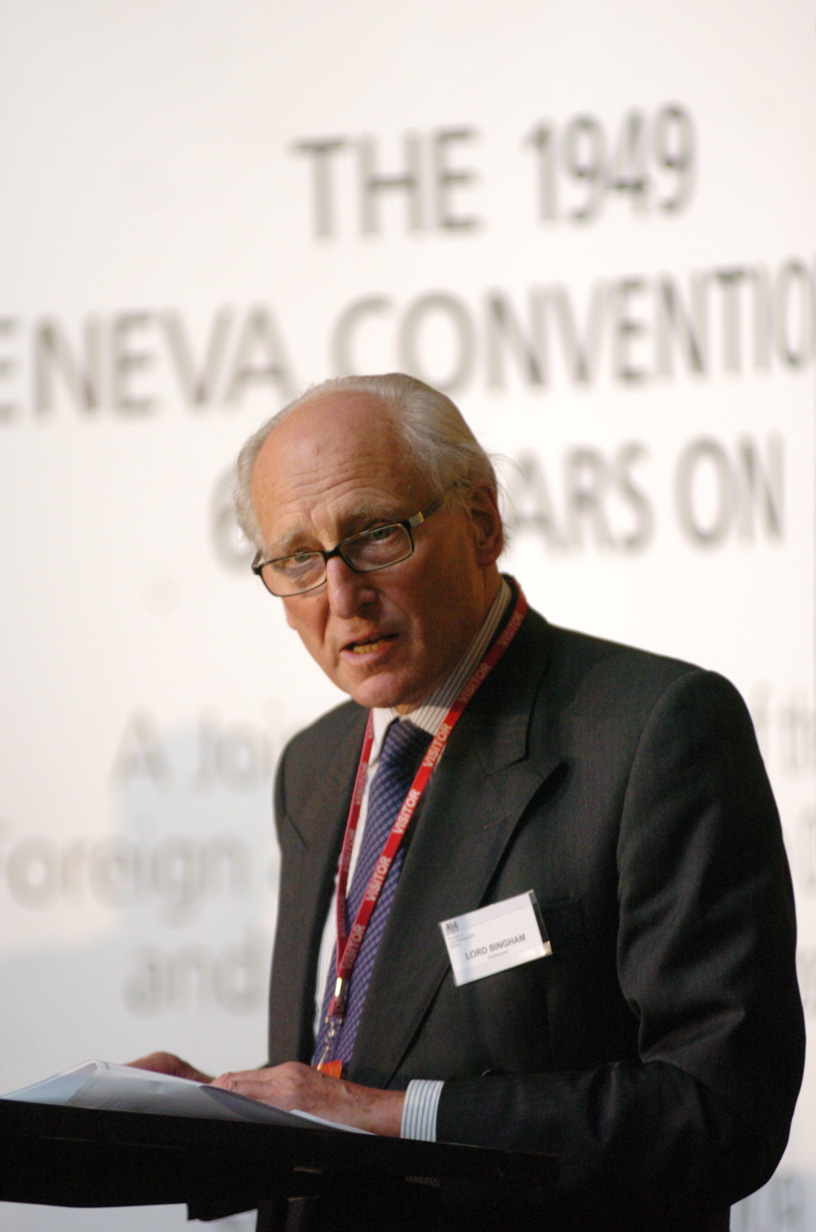
The most broadly accepted meaning of the rule of law, advocated by Lord Bingham, includes the principle of legality, human rights and commitment to democracy and international law.

The rule of law also requires law is truly enforced, though enforcement bodies may have room for discretion. In R (Corner House Research) v Director of the Serious Fraud Office a group campaigning against the arms trade, Corner House Research, claimed the Serious Fraud Office acted unlawfully by dropping an investigation into the UK-Saudi Arabia Al-Yamamah arms deal. It was alleged that BAE Systems plc paid bribes to Saudi government figures. The House of Lords held the SFO was entitled to take into account the public interest in not pursuing an investigation, including the security threats that might transpire. Baroness Hale remarked that the SFO had to consider "the principle that no-one, including powerful British companies who do business for powerful foreign countries, is above the law", but the decision reached was not unreasonable. When enforcement or court proceedings do take place, they should proceed swiftly: anyone who is detained must be charged and put on trial or released. People must also be able to access justice in practice. In R (UNISON) v Lord Chancellor the Supreme Court held the government's imposition of £1200 in fees to bring an Employment Tribunal claim undermined the rule of law, and was void. The Lord Chancellor had statutory authority to create fees for court services, but this led to a 70% drop in claims at Employment Tribunals against employers for breach of labour rights, such as unfair dismissal, unlawful wage deductions or discrimination. Lord Reed held the "constitutional right of access to the courts is inherent in the rule of law". Without access to courts, "laws are liable to become a dead letter, the work done by Parliament may be rendered nugatory, and the democratic election of Members of Parliament may become a meaningless charade." In principle every person is subject to the law, including government ministers, or corporate executives, who may be held in contempt of court for violating an order. In other systems the idea of a separation of powers is seen as an essential part of maintaining the rule of law. In theory, originally advocated by Baron de Montesquieu, there should be a strict separation of the executive, legislature and judiciary. While other systems, notably the United States, attempted to put this into practice (e.g. requiring the executive does not come from the legislature) it is clear that modern political parties may undermine such a separation by capturing all three branches of government. In the UK, democracy has been advanced since the early 20th century despite the fact that "there is no formal separation of powers in the United Kingdom." The Constitutional Reform Act 2005 did, however, end the practice of the Lord Chancellor sitting as the head of the judiciary, while also being a Member of Parliament, and sitting in the cabinet. Since the Act of Settlement 1700, there has been only one instance of a judge being removed, and a suspension cannot happen without the Lord Chief Justice and the Lord Chancellor following a judge being subject to criminal proceedings. There is now a duty on all ministers to "uphold the continued independence of the judiciary", including against assault by powerful corporations or the media.

=== Democracy ===
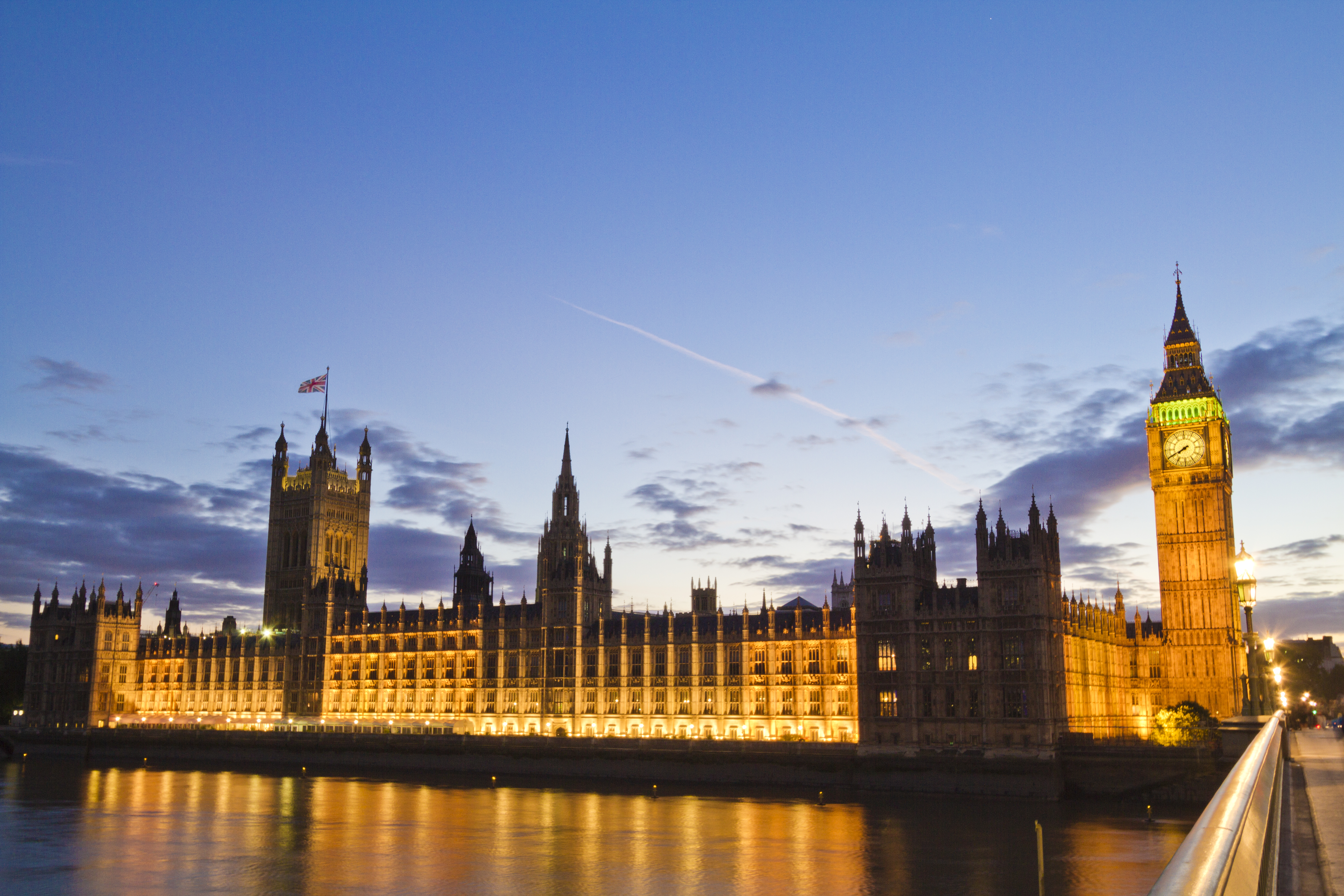
Parliament was recognised as a forum for the King for "common counsel" in Magna Carta, sealing a tradition going back to the Anglo-Saxon Witan.

The principle of a "democratic society" is generally seen as a fundamental legitimating factor of both Parliamentary sovereignty and the rule of law. A functioning representative and deliberative democracy, which upholds human rights legitimises the fact of Parliamentary sovereignty, and it is widely considered that "democracy lies at the heart of the concept of the rule of law", because the opposite of arbitrary power exercised by one person is "administration is in the hands of the many and not of the few'". According to the preamble to the European Convention on Human Rights, as drafted by British lawyers following World War II, fundamental human rights and freedoms are themselves "best maintained... by "an effective political democracy". Similarly, this "characteristic principle of democracy" is enshrined by the First Protocol, article 3, which requires the "right to free elections" to "ensure the free expression of the opinion of the people in the choice of the legislature". While there are many conceptions of democracy, such as "direct", "representative" or "deliberative", the dominant view in modern political theory is that democracy requires an active citizenry, not only in electing representatives, but in taking part in political life. Its essence lies not simply majority decision-making, nor referendums that can easily be used as a tool of manipulation, "but in the making of politically responsible decisions" and in "large-scale social changes maximising the freedom" of humankind. The legitimacy of law in a democratic society depends upon a constant process of deliberative discussion and public debate, rather than imposition of decisions. It is also generally agreed that basic standards in political, social and economic rights are necessary to ensure everyone can play a meaningful role in political life. For this reason, the rights to free voting in fair elections and "general welfare in a democratic society" have developed hand-in-hand with all human rights, and form a fundamental cornerstone of international law.

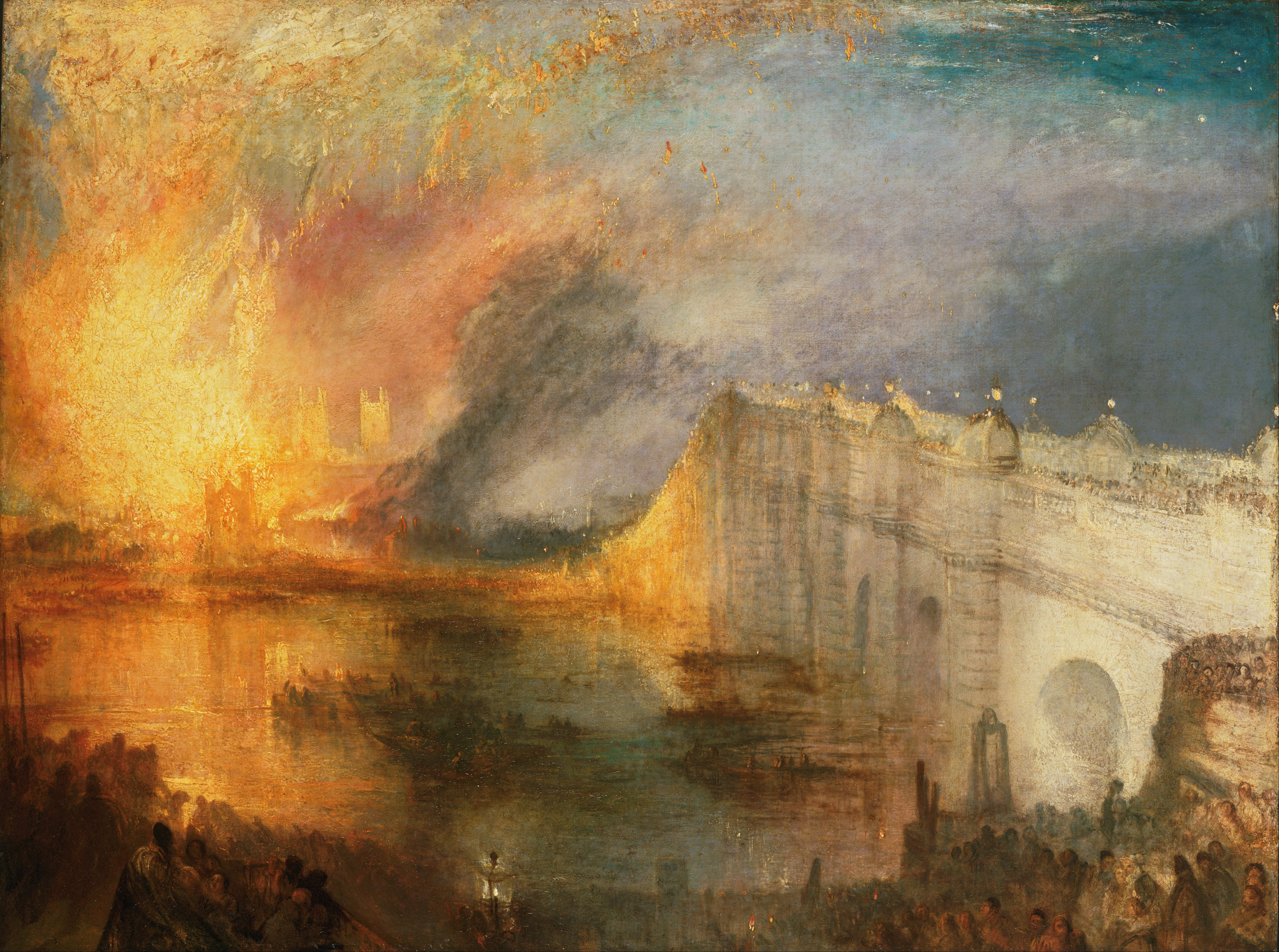
Parliament, depicted here by J. M. W. Turner on fire in 1834, has been threatened by the Monarch and authoritarian governments by prorogation or suspension since its inception.

In the UK's "modern democratic constitution", the principle of democracy is manifested through statutes and case law which guarantee the right to vote in fair elections, and through its use as a principle of interpretation by courts. In 1703, in the landmark case of Ashby v White, Lord Holt CJ stated that the right of everyone "to give [their] vote at the election of a person to represent [them] in Parliament, there to concur to the making of laws, which are to bind [their] liberty and property, is a most transcendent thing, and of an high nature". This has meant that the courts actively ensure that votes cast are counted, and that democratic elections are conducted according to law. In Morgan v Simpson the Court of Appeal held that if a vote "was conducted so badly that it was not substantially in accordance with the law as" then it would be declared void, and so would even minor irregularities that would affect the result. A considerable body of regulation, for instance in the Representation of the People Act 1983 or the Political Parties, Elections and Referendums Act 2000, restrict spending or any foreign interference because, according to Baroness Hale "each person has equal value" and "we do not want our government or its policies to be decided by the highest spenders." More broadly, the concept of a "democratic society" and what is "necessary" for its functioning underpins the entire scheme of interpretation for the European Convention on Human Rights as applied in British law, particularly after the Human Rights Act 1998, because each right can usually only be restricted if "in accordance with law" and as "necessary in a democratic society". The place of the social welfare state that is necessary to support democratic life is also manifested through courts' interpretation. For instance, in Gorringe v Calderdale MBC Lord Steyn, giving the leading judgment said it was "necessary" to view the law of negligence in the context of "the contours of our social welfare state." More generally, the common law has been increasingly developed to be harmonious with statutory rights, and also in harmony with rights under international law.

=== Internationalism ===
Like other democratic countries, the principles of international law are a basic component of the British constitution, both as a primary tool of interpretation of domestic law, and through the UK's consistent support and membership of major international organisations. As far back as Magna Carta, English law recognised the right to free movement of people for international trade. By 1608, Sir Edward Coke wrote confidently that international commercial law, or the lex mercatoria, is part of the laws of the realm, while the constitutional crises of the 17th century centred upon Parliament halting the King's attempting to tax international trade without its consent. At the turn of the 18th century, Lord Holt CJ saw international law as a general tool for interpreting the common law, and Lord Mansfield affirmed that the international lex mercatoria "is not the law of a particular country but the law of all nations", and "the law of merchants and the law of the land is the same". In 1774, in Somerset v Stewart, one of the most important cases in legal history, Lord Mansfield held that slavery was lawful "in no country" and therefore in common law. In modern case law it has been consistently accepted that it "is a principle of legal policy that [UK] law should conform to public international law." The House of Lords stressed that "there is a strong presumption in favour of interpreting English law (whether common law or statute) in a way which does not place the United Kingdom in breach of an international obligation." For example, in Hounga v Allen the Supreme Court held that a young lady who had been illegally trafficked to the UK had a right to bring a race discrimination claim against her employers, even though she had herself been in violation of the Immigration Act 1971. In doing so, the court unanimously drew upon international treaties signed by the UK, known as the Palermo Protocols, as well as the European Convention on Human Rights, in interpreting the scope of the common law doctrine of illegality, and held it was no bar for the claimant to assert her legal rights. It has been further debated whether the UK should adopt a theory of that sees international law as part of UK without any further act (a "monist" theory), or whether it should still be required for international law principles to be translated into domestic law (a "dualist" theory). For comparison, the current position in European Union law is that while international law binds the EU, it cannot undermine fundamental principles of constitutional law or human rights.

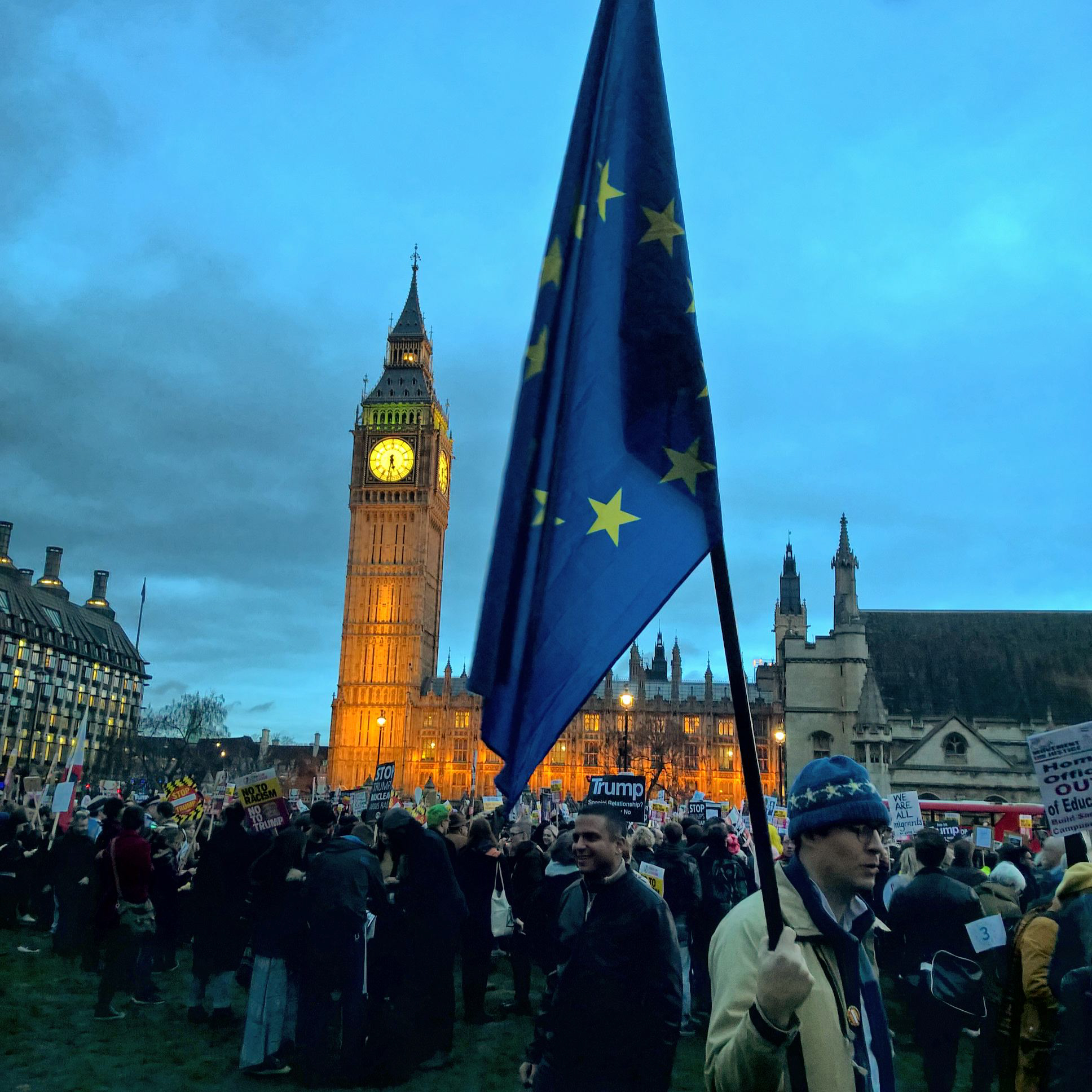
The 2016 United Kingdom European Union membership referendum challenged British membership of the European Union, as 27% of the British population voted to "leave": on a 72.21% turnout, 51.89% voted to leave, and 48.11% to remain. The referendum was unsuccessfully challenged as violating international law and common law standards of free and fair voting. Ultimately the 2019 general election resolved the issue with a majority in Parliament committed to leave.

Since the World Wars brought an end to the British Empire and physically destroyed large parts of the country, the UK has consistently supported organisations formed under international law. From the Versailles Treaty 1919, the UK was a founding member of the International Labour Organization, which sets universal standards for people's rights at work. After the failure of the League of Nations and following World War II, the UK became a founding member of the United Nations, recognised by Parliament through the United Nations Act 1946, enabling any resolution of the Security Council except the use of force to be implemented by an Order in Council. Under the Universal Declaration of Human Rights 1948, the continued colonial occupation, and suppression of democracy and human rights in the British Empire lost any remaining legitimacy under international law, and combined with independence movements this led to the Empire's rapid dissolution. Two fundamental treaties, the International Covenant on Civil and Political Rights, and the International Covenant on Economic, Social and Cultural Rights in 1966 saw the UK ratify most rights from the Universal Declaration. Following the Ponsonby Rule from 1924, the Constitutional Reform and Governance Act 2010 section 20 stipulates that a treaty is ratified once it is laid before Parliament for 21 days and no adverse resolution is passed against it.

Regionally, the UK participated in drafting the European Convention on Human Rights 1950 which sought to guarantee basic standards of democracy and human rights to preserve peace in post-war Europe. At the same time, following long-held visions for European integration with the UK "at the centre", democratic European countries sought to integrate their economies both to make war impossible, and to advance social progress. In 1972, the UK joined the European Community (renamed the European Union in 1992) and committed to implement EU law in which it participated, in the European Communities Act 1972. In 1995, the UK also became a founding member of the World Trade Organization. To ensure that the European Convention was directly applied by the courts, the Human Rights Act 1998 was passed. It also passed the International Criminal Court Act 2001 to enable prosecution of war criminals, and subjected itself to the jurisdiction of the court. In 2016, however, the UK voted in a referendum on whether to leave the European Union, resulting on a 72.21% turnout in a margin of 48.11% favouring "remain", 51.89% favouring "leave" on unspecified terms (27% of the total British population). However, large majorities in both Scotland, Northern Ireland and London favoured remaining in the EU. The 2019 general election resolved the issue with a majority in Parliament elected on a platform to give up membership: the terms were agreed in December 2020.

== Institutions ==
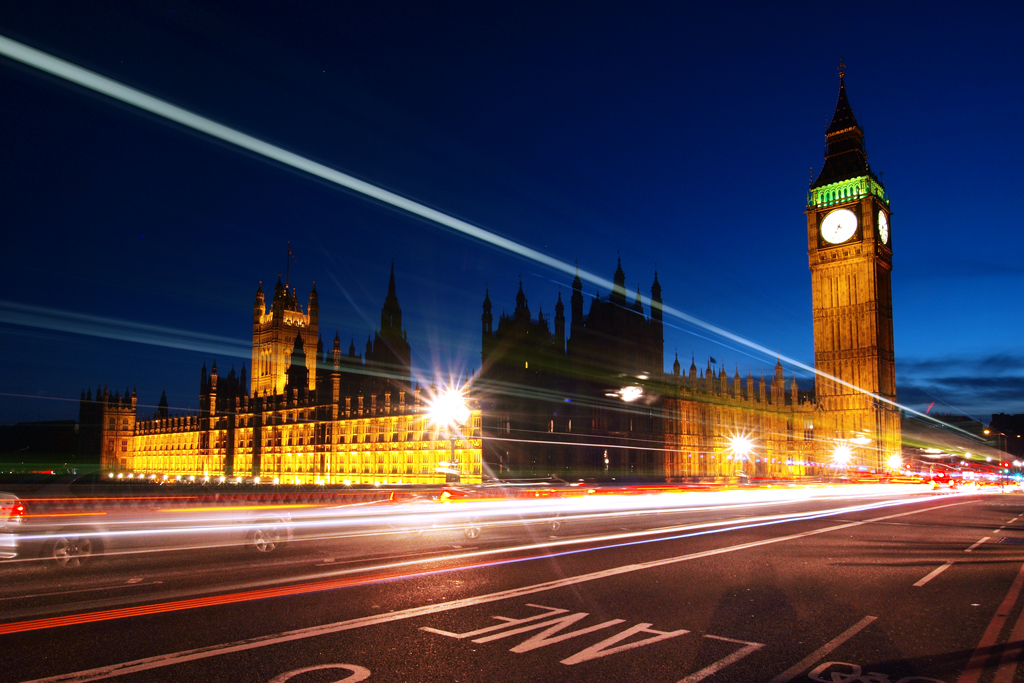
The British system of parliamentary democracy ensures that the executive, and the prime minister, is removable by a simple majority vote in the House of Commons. The executive is bound to the rule of law, interpreted by the judiciary, but the judiciary may not declare an Act of Parliament to be unconstitutional.

While principles may the basis of the British constitution, the institutions of the state perform its functions in practice. First, Parliament is the sovereign entity. Its two chambers legislate. In the House of Commons each Member of Parliament is elected by a simple majority in a democratic vote, although outcomes do not always accurately match people's preferences overall. Historically, most elections occurred each four years, but this was fixed at five years in 2011. Election spending is tightly controlled, foreign interference is prohibited, and donations and lobbying are limited in whatever form. The House of Lords reviews and votes upon legislative proposals by the Commons. It can delay legislation by one year, and cannot delay at all if the proposed Act concerns money. Most Lords are appointed by the Prime Minister, through the King, on the advice of a Commission which, by convention, offers some balance between political parties. Ninety-two hereditary peers remain. To become law, each Act of Parliament must be read by both houses three times, and given royal assent by the monarch. The monarch cannot veto legislation, by convention, since 1708. Second, the judiciary interprets the law. It can not strike down an Act of Parliament, but the judiciary ensures that any law which may violate fundamental rights has to be clearly expressed, to force politicians to openly confront what they are doing and "accept the political cost". Under the Constitutional Reform Act 2005, the judiciary is appointed by the Judicial Appointments Commission with cross-party and judicial recommendations, to protect judicial independence. Third, the executive branch of government is led by the prime minister who must be able to command a majority in the House of Commons. The Cabinet of Ministers is appointed by the Prime Minister to lead the main departments of state, such as the Treasury, the Foreign Office, the Department of Health and the Department of Education. Officially the "head of state" is the monarch, but all prerogative power is exercised by the Prime Minister, subject to judicial review. Fourth, as the UK matured as a modern democracy, an extensive system of civil servants, and public service institutions developed to deliver UK residents economic, social and legal rights. All public bodies, and private bodies that perform public functions, are bound by the rule of law.

=== Parliament ===
In the British constitution, Parliament sits at the apex of power. It emerged through a series of revolutions as the dominant body, over the church, courts, and the monarch, and within Parliament the House of Commons emerged as the dominant chamber, over the House of Lords that traditionally represented the aristocracy. The central justification for Parliamentary sovereignty is usually thought to be its democratic nature, although it was only upon the Representation of the People (Equal Franchise) Act 1928 that Parliament could be said to have finally become "democratic" in any modern sense (as property qualifications to vote were abolished for everyone over 21), and not until after WW2 that decolonisation, university constituencies and lowering of the voting age took place. Parliament's main functions are to legislate, to allocate money for public spending, and to scrutinise the government. In practice many MPs are involved in Parliamentary committees which investigate spending, policies, laws and their impact, and often report to recommend reform. For instance, the Modernisation Committee of the House of Commons in 2002 recommended publishing draft bills before they became law, and was later found to have been highly successful. There are 650 Members of Parliament (MPs) in the House of Commons, currently elected in five year terms unless two-thirds vote for an early election, and 790 peers in the House of Lords. For a proposed Bill to become an Act, and law, it must be read three times in each chamber, and given royal assent by the monarch.

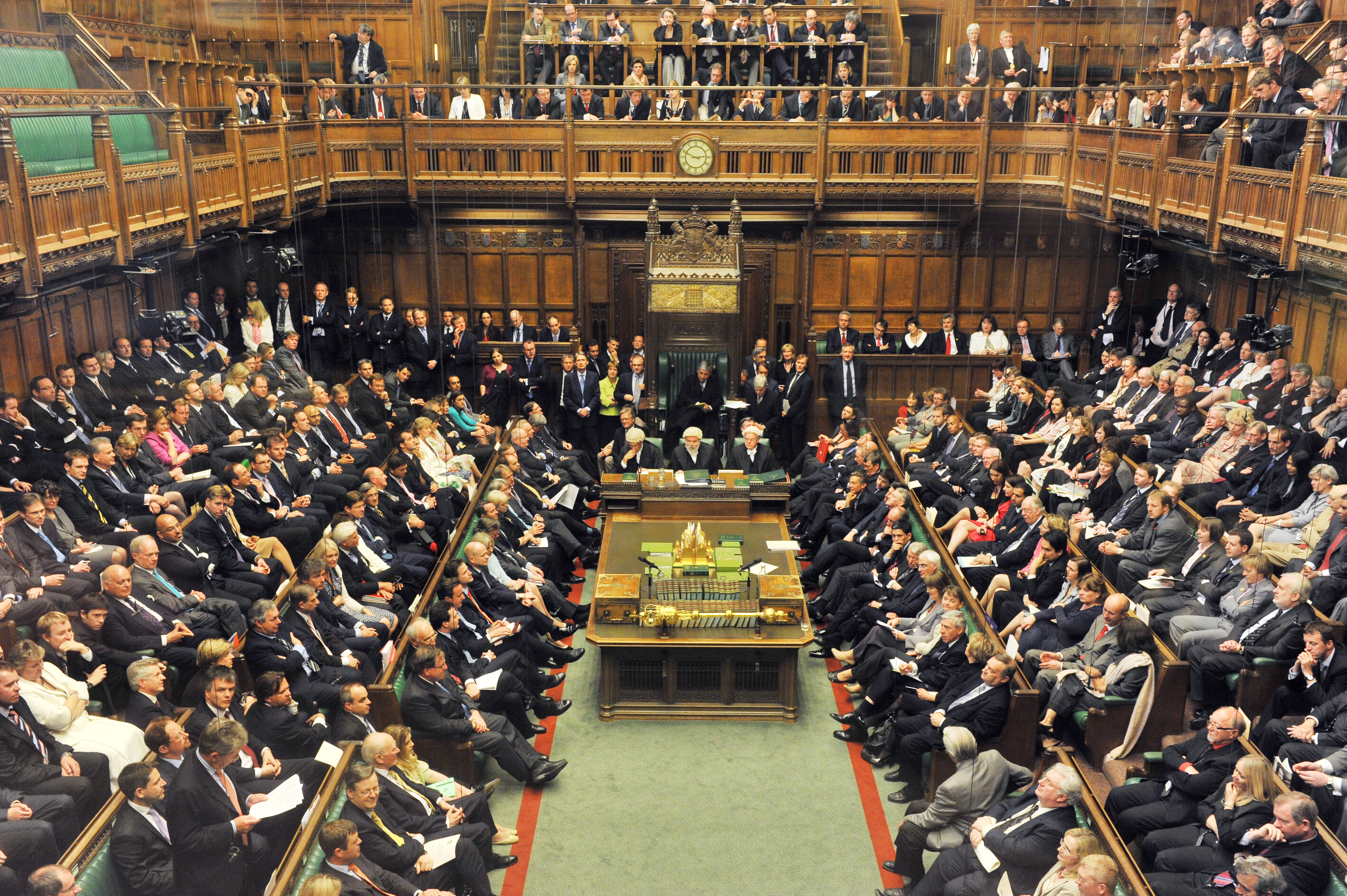
The House of Commons is the most important body in the British constitution. Its Members of Parliament are democratically elected by constituencies across the UK, and the parties who have a majority in the Commons form the British government.

Today the House of Commons is the primary organ of representative government. The Representation of the People Act 1983 section 1 gives the right to vote for MP in the House of Commons to all Commonwealth citizens, and citizens of the Republic of Ireland, who are over age 18, and registered. Sections 3 and 4 exclude people who are convicted of an offence and in a penal institution, or detained under mental health laws. These restrictions fall below European standards, which require that people who are convicted of very minor crimes (such as petty theft or drug offences) have the right to vote. Since 2013, everyone has to register individually to vote (for instance, at www.gov.uk/register-to-vote), instead of households being able to register collectively, but an annual household canvass is conducted to increase the number of registered people. As far back as 1703,Ashby v White recognised the right to "vote at the election of a person to represent him or [her] in Parliament, there to concur to the making of laws, which are to bind his liberty and property" as "a most transcendent thing, and of an high nature". This originally meant that any interference in that right would lead to damages. If the denial of voting would have changed the result, or if a vote was "conducted so badly that it was not substantially in accordance with the law" the vote would have to be run again. So, in Morgan v Simpson the Court of Appeal declared that an election for a Greater London Council seat was not valid after it was found that 44 unstamped ballot papers were not counted. These common law principles predate statutory regulation, and therefore appear to apply to any vote, including elections and referendums. Election spending is tightly controlled today by statute. A maximum of £20 million can be spent by political parties in national campaigns, plus £10,000 in each constituency. Political advertisements on television are prohibited except for those in certain free time slots, although the internet remains largely unregulated. Any spending over £500 by third parties must be disclosed. While these rules are strict, they were held in Animal Defenders International v UK to be compatible with the Convention because "each person has equal value" and "we do not want our government or its policies to be decided by the highest spenders." Foreign interference in voting is completely prohibited, including any "broadcasting" (also over the internet) "with intent to influence persons to give or refrain from giving their votes". Donations by foreign parties can be forfeited in their entirety to the Electoral Commission. Domestic donations are limited to registered parties, and must be reported, when they are over £7,500 nationally or £1,500 locally, to the Electoral Commission. The system for electing the Commons is based on constituencies, whose boundaries are periodically reviewed to even out populations. There has been considerable debate about the first-past-the-post system of voting the UK uses, as it tends to exclude minority parties. By contrast, in Australia voters may select preferences for candidates, although this system was rejected in a 2011 United Kingdom Alternative Vote referendum staged by the Cameron-Clegg coalition. In the European Parliament, voters choose a party from multi-member regional constituencies: this tends to give smaller parties much greater representation. In the Scottish Parliament, Welsh Assembly and London Assembly, voters have the choice of both constituencies and a party list, which tends to reflect overall preferences best. To be elected as an MP, most people generally become members of political parties, and must be over 18 on the day of nomination to run for a seat, be a qualifying Commonwealth or Irish citizen, not be bankrupt, found guilty of corrupt practices, or be a Lord, judge or employee of the civil service. To limit the government's practical control over Parliament, the Ministerial and Other Salaries Act 1975 restricts higher payment of salaries to a set number of MPs.

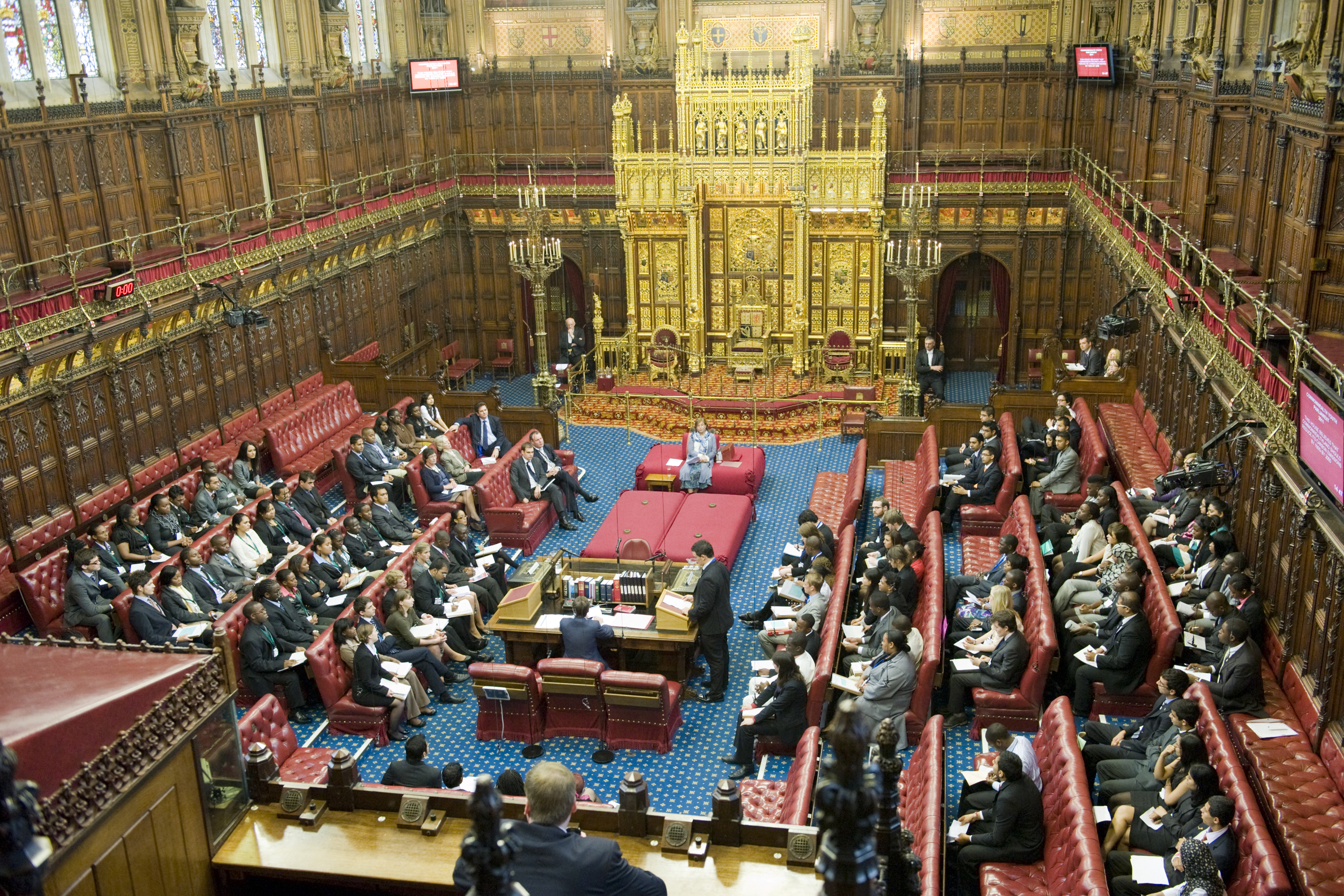
The House of Lords is a chamber mostly appointed by the prime minister, loosely based on the Lords' expertise, achievement, or political affiliation. Since the abolition of most hereditary peers, there has been ongoing debate about whether or how to elect the House of Lords.

Along with a hereditary monarch, the House of Lords remains an historical curiosity in the British constitution. Traditionally it represented the landed aristocracy, and political allies of the monarch or the government, and has only gradually and incompletely been reformed. Today, the House of Lords Act 1999 and the House of Lords Act 2026 have abolished all hereditary peers, leaving all remaining peers to be "life peers" appointed by the government under the Life Peerages Act 1958, law lords appointed under the Appellate Jurisdiction Act 1876, and Lords Spiritual who are senior clergy of the Church of England. Since 2005, senior judges can only sit and vote in the House of Lords after retirement. The government carries out appointment of most peers, but since 2000 has taken advice from a seven-person House of Lords Appointments Commission with representatives from the Labour, Conservatives and Liberal-Democrat parties. A peerage can always be disclaimed, and ex-peers may then run for Parliament. Since 2015, a peer may be suspended or expelled by the House. In practice the Parliament Act 1949 greatly reduced the House of Lords' power, as can only delay and cannot block legislation by one year, and cannot delay money bills at all. Nevertheless, several options for reform are debated. A House of Lords Reform Bill 2012 proposed to have 360 directly elected members, 90 appointed members, 12 bishops and an uncertain number of ministerial members. The elected Lords would have been elected by proportional representation for 15 year terms, through 10 regional constituencies on a single transferable vote system. However, the government withdrew support after backlash from Conservative backbenches. It has often been argued that if the Lords were elected by geographic constituencies and a party controlled both sides "there would be little prospect of effective scrutiny or revision of government business." A second option, like in Swedish Riksdag, could simply be to abolish the House of Lords: this was in fact done during the English Civil War in 1649, but restored along with the monarchy in 1660. A third proposed option is to elect peers by work and professional groups, so that health care workers elect peers with special health knowledge, people in education elect a fixed number of education experts, legal professionals elect legal representatives, and so on. This is argued to be necessary to improve the quality of legislation.

=== Judiciary ===
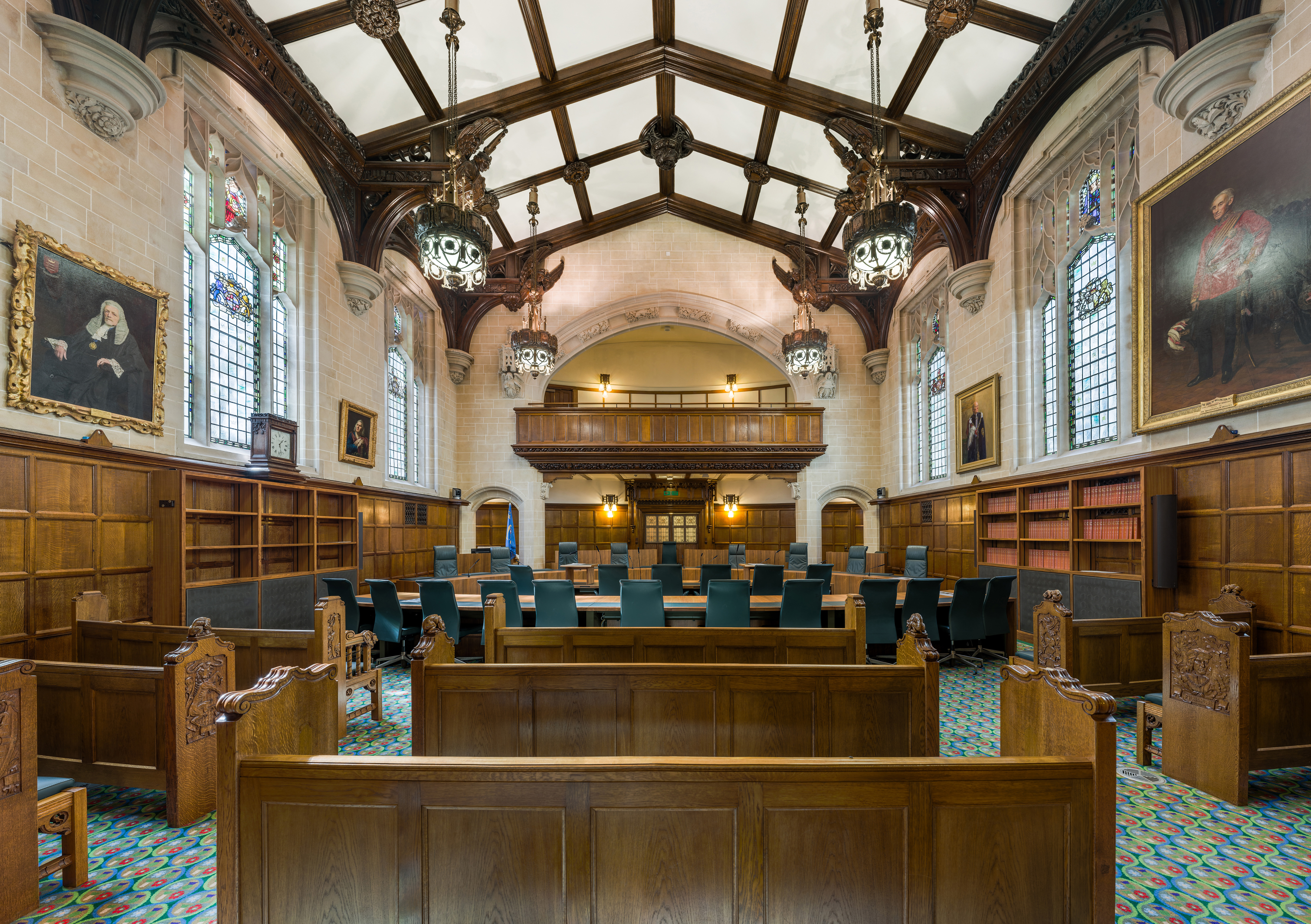
Proceedings in the Supreme Court, which moved to its modern home at Middlesex Guildhall in 2009, are web-streamed live, and judges no longer wear wigs.

The judiciary in the United Kingdom has the essential functions of upholding the rule of law, democracy, and human rights. The highest court of appeal, renamed from the House of Lords in 2005, is the Supreme Court. Since the 1966 Practice Statement, the judiciary has acknowledged that while a system of precedent, that binds lower courts, is necessary to provide "at least some degree of certainty", the courts should update their jurisprudence and "depart from a previous decision when it appears right to do so." Litigation usually begins in a County Court or the High Court for civil law issues, or a magistrates' court or the Crown Court for criminal law issues. There are also employment tribunals for labour law disputes, and the First-tier Tribunal for public or regulatory disputes, ranging from immigration, to social security, to tax. After the High Court, Crown Court, or appeal tribunals, cases generally may appeal to the Court of Appeal in England and Wales. In Scotland, the Court of Session has an Outer (first instance) and Inner (appeal) House. Appeals then go to the Supreme Court, although at any time a court may make a "preliminary reference" to the Court of Justice of the European Union to clarify the meaning of EU law. Since the Human Rights Act 1998, courts have been expressly required to interpret British law to be compatible with the European Convention on Human Rights. This follows a longer tradition of courts interpreting the law to be compatible with international law obligations. It is generally accepted that the British courts do not merely apply but also create new law through their interpretative function: this is obvious in the common law and equity, where there is no codified statutory basis for large parts of the law, such as contracts, torts or trusts. This also means an element of retroactivity, since an application of developing rules may differ from at least one party's understanding of the law in any conflict. Although formally the British judiciary may not declare an Act of Parliament "unconstitutional", in practice the judiciary's power to interpret the law so as to be compatible with human rights can render a statute inoperative, much like in other countries. The courts do so sparingly because they recognise the importance of the democratic process. Judges may also sit from time to time on public inquiries.

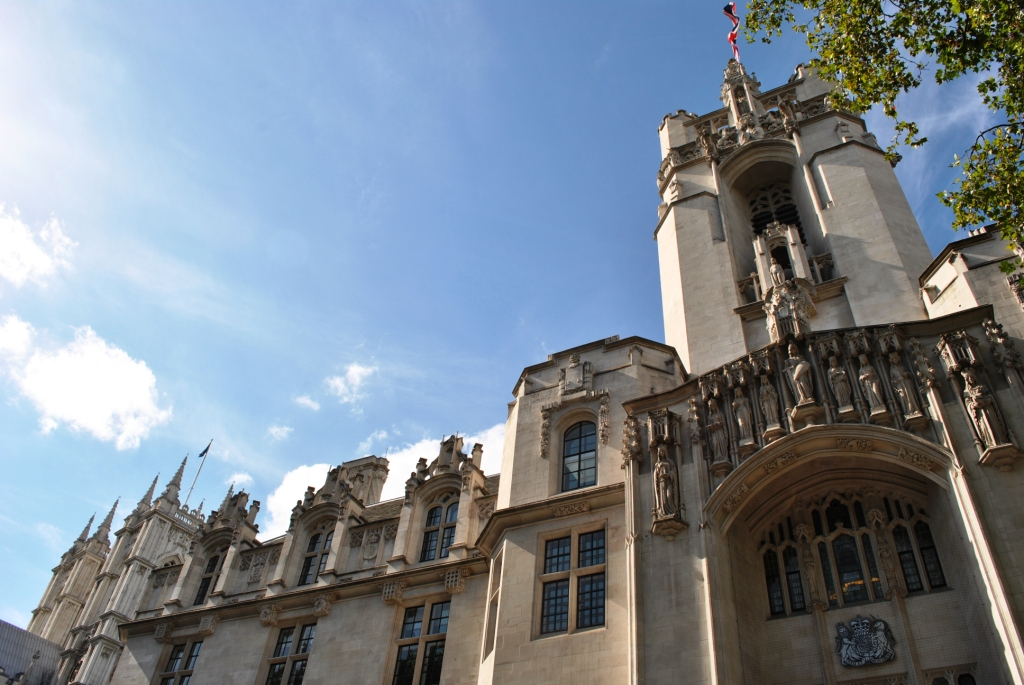
The Supreme Court on Parliament Square.

The independence of the judiciary is one of the cornerstones of the constitution, and means in practice that judges cannot be dismissed from office. Since the Act of Settlement 1700, no judge has been removed, as to do so the King must act on address by both Houses of Parliament. It is very likely that a judge would never be dismissed, not merely because of formal rules but a "shared constitutional understanding" of the importance of the integrity of the legal system. This is reflected, for example, in the sub judice rule that matters awaiting decision in court should not be prejudged in a Parliamentary debate. The Lord Chancellor (once head of the judiciary but now simply a government minister) also has a statutory duty to uphold the independence of the judiciary, for instance, against attacks upon their integrity by media, corporations, or the government itself. Members of the judiciary can be appointed from among any member of the legal profession who has over 10 years of experience having rights of audience before a court: this usually includes barristers, but can also mean solicitors or academics. Appointments should be made "solely on merit" but regard may be had to the need for diversity when two candidates have equal qualifications. For appointments to the Supreme Court, a five-member Judicial Appointments Committee is formed including one Supreme Court judge, three members from the Judicial Appointments Commission, and one lay person. For other senior judges such as those on the Court of Appeal, or for the Lord Chief Justice, Master of the Rolls, or the heads of the High Court divisions, a similar five member panel with two judges is formed. Gender and ethnic diversity is lacking in the British judiciary compared to other developed countries, and potentially compromises the expertise and administration of justice. Backing up the judiciary is a considerable body of administrative law. The Contempt of Court Act 1981 enables a court to hold anyone in contempt, and commit the person to imprisonment, for violating a court order, or behaviour that could compromise a fair judicial process. In practice this is enforced by the executive. The Lord Chancellor heads the Ministry of Justice, which performs various functions including administering the Legal Aid Agency for people who cannot afford access to the courts. In R (UNISON) v Lord Chancellor the government suffered scathing criticism for creating high fees that cut the number of applicants to employment tribunals by 70 per cent. In England and Wales, the Attorney General for England and Wales and the Solicitor General for England and Wales represent the Crown in litigation. The Attorney General also appoints the Director of Public Prosecutions who heads the Crown Prosecution Service, which reviews cases submitted by the police for prosecution, and conducts them on behalf of the Crown.

=== Executive ===
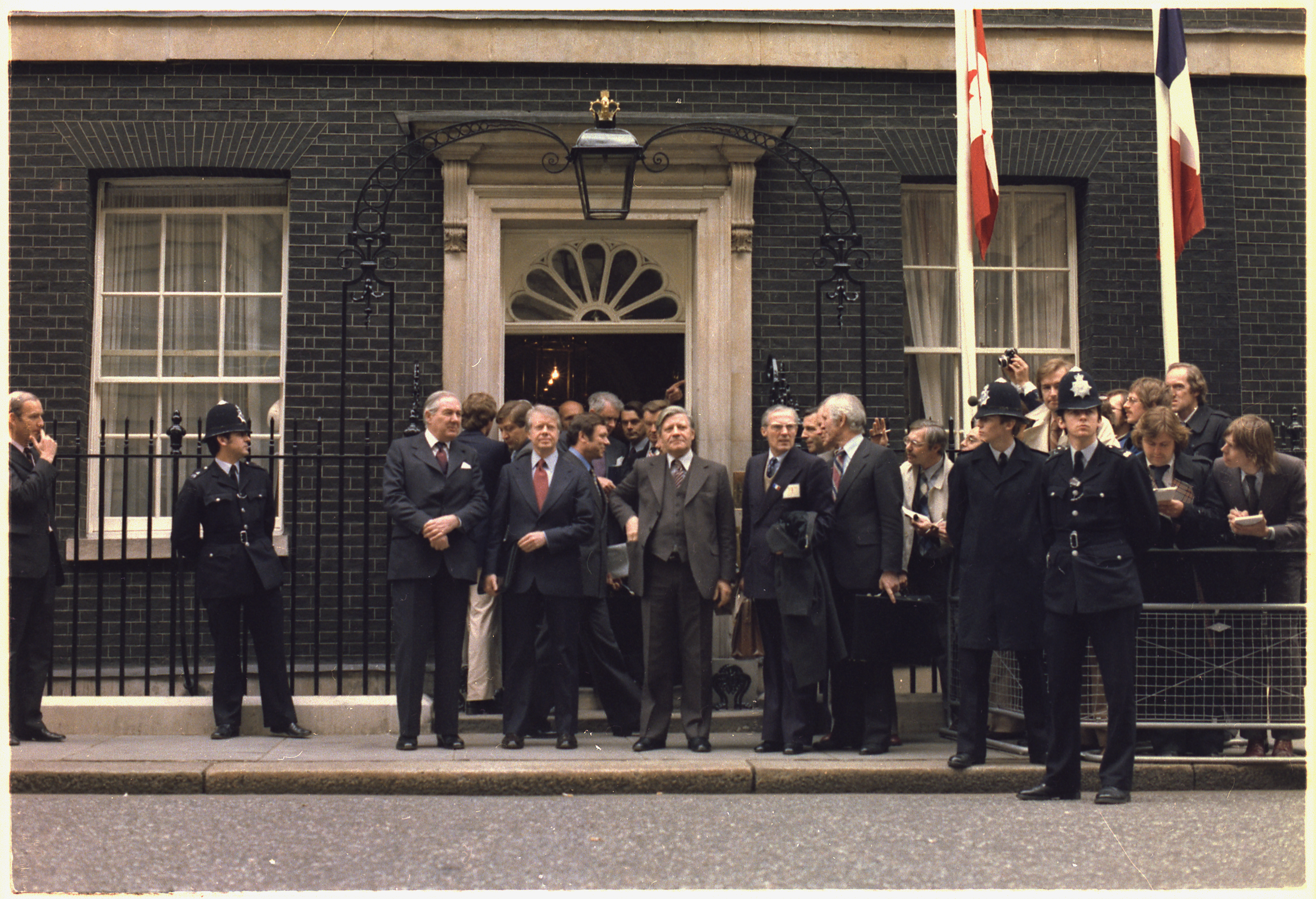
The prime minister, at 10 Downing Street, exercises political power of the British government, when they command majority support of the House of Commons.

The executive branch, while subservient to Parliament and judicial oversight, exercises day to day power of the British government. In form, the UK remains a constitutional monarchy. The formal head of state is His Majesty King Charles III, a hereditary monarch since 2022. In reality, no Queen or King has attempted to usurp the will of Parliament since 1708, and all constitutional duties and power are accepted by binding convention to have shifted to the prime minister, Parliament or the courts. Over the 17th century, the Petition of Right 1628 was asserted by Parliament to prevent any taxation by the monarch without Parliament's consent, and the Habeas Corpus Act 1640 denied the monarch any power to arrest people for failing to pay taxes. The monarch's continued assertion of the divine right to rule led to Charles I being executed in the English Civil War, and finally the settlement of power in the Bill of Rights 1689. Following the Act of Union 1707 and an early financial crisis as South Sea Company shares crashed, Robert Walpole emerged as a dominant political figure. Leading the House of Commons from 1721 to 1742, Walpole is generally acknowledged to be the first prime minister (Primus inter pares). The PM's modern functions include leading the dominant political party, setting policy priorities, creating Ministries and appointing ministers, judges, peers, and civil servants. The PM also has considerable control through the convention of collective responsibility (that ministers must publicly support the government even when they privately disagree, or resign), and control over the government's communications to the public. By contrast in law, as is necessary in a democratic society, the monarch is a figurehead with no political power, but a series of ceremonial duties, and considerable funding. Aside from private wealth and finance, the monarchy is funded under the Sovereign Grant Act 2011, which reserves 25 per cent of the net revenue from the Crown Estate. The Crown Estate is a public, government corporation, which in 2015 held £12 billion in investments, mostly land and property, and therefore generates income by charging rent to businesses or people for homes. The monarch's major ceremonial duties are to appoint the prime minister who can command the majority of the House of Commons, to give royal assent to Acts of Parliament, and to dissolve Parliament upon the calling of an election. Minor ceremonial duties include giving an audience to the Prime Minister, as well as visiting ministers or diplomats from the Commonwealth, and acting on state occasions, such as delivering the "King's speech" (written by the government, outlining its political platform) at the opening of Parliament. It has frequently been debated whether the UK should abolish the monarchy, on the ground that hereditary inheritance of political office has no place in a democracy. On the other hand, there are powerful attachments of emotion and tradition: in Australia a referendum was held in 1999 on becoming a Republic, but failed to get a majority.

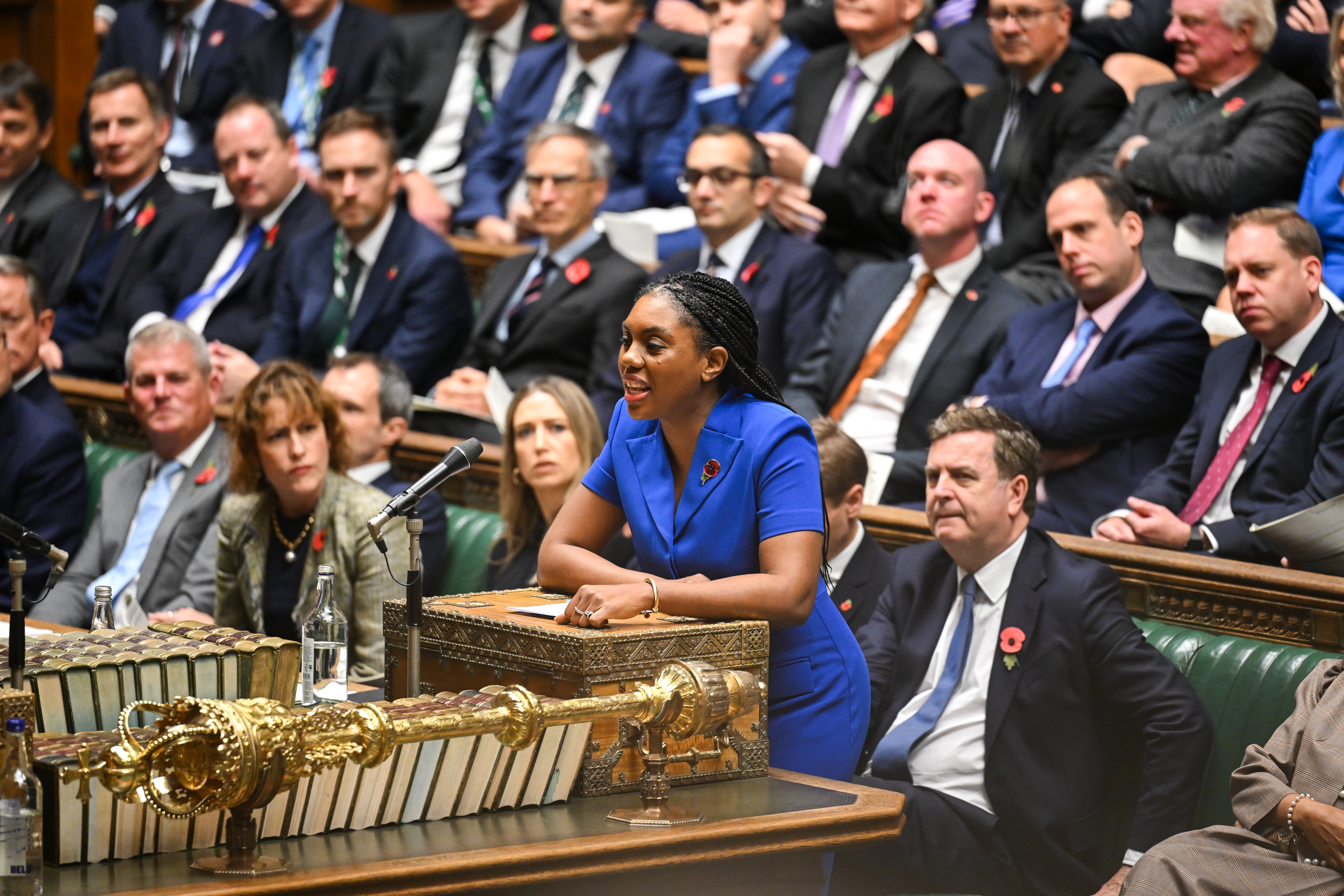
The task of the official opposition, currently led by Kemi Badenoch of the Conservatives, is to hold the government and the Prime Minister to account in and out of Parliament.

Although called the royal prerogative, a series of important powers that were once vested in the king or queen are now exercised by government, and the prime minister in particular. These are powers of day-to-day management, but tightly constrained to ensure that executive power cannot usurp Parliament or the courts. In the Case of Prohibitions in 1607, it was held that the royal prerogative could not be used to determine court cases, and in the Case of Proclamations in 1610 it was held new prerogative powers could not be created by the executive. It is also clear that no exercise of the prerogative can compromise any right contained in an Act of Parliament. So, for instance, in R (Miller) v Secretary of State for Exiting the EU the Supreme Court held that the Prime Minister could not notify the European Commission of an intention to leave under Article 50 of the Treaty on European Union without an Act of Parliament, because it could result in rights being withdrawn that were granted under the European Communities Act 1972, such as the right to work in other EU member states or vote in European Parliament elections. Royal prerogative powers can be categorised in different ways, there are around 15. First, the executive may create hereditary titles, confer honours and create peers. Second, the executive can legislate by an Order in Council, though this has been called an 'anachronistic survival'. Third, the executive can create and administer financial benefits schemes. Fourth, through the Attorney General the executive can stop prosecutions or pardon convicted offenders after taking advice. Fifth, the executive may acquire more territory or alter limits of British territorial waters. Sixth, the executive may expel aliens and theoretically restrain people from leaving the UK. The executive can sign treaties, although before it is considered ratified the treaty must be laid before Parliament for 21 days and there must be no resolution against it. Eighth, the executive governs the armed forces and can do "all those things in an emergency which are necessary for the conduct of war". The executive cannot declare war without Parliament by convention, and in any case has no hope in funding war without Parliament. Ninth, the Prime Minister can appoint ministers, judges, public officials or royal commissioners. Tenth, the monarch needs to pay no tax, unless statute states it expressly. Eleventh, the executive may by royal charter create corporations, such as the BBC, and franchises for markets, ferries and fisheries. Twelfth, the executive has the right to mine precious metals, and to take treasure troves. Thirteenth, it may make coins. Fourteenth, it can print or license the authorised version of the Bible, Book of Common Prayer and state papers. And fifteenth, subject to modern family law, it may take guardianship of infants. In addition to these royal prerogative powers, there are innumerable powers explicitly laid down in statutes enabling the executive to make legal changes. This includes a growing number of Henry VIII clauses, which enable a Secretary of State to alter provisions of primary legislation. For this reason it has often been argued that executive authority should be reduced, written into statute, and never used to deprive people of rights without Parliament. All uses of the prerogative, however, are subject to judicial review: in the GCHQ case the House of Lords held that no person could be deprived of legitimate expectations by use of the royal prerogative.

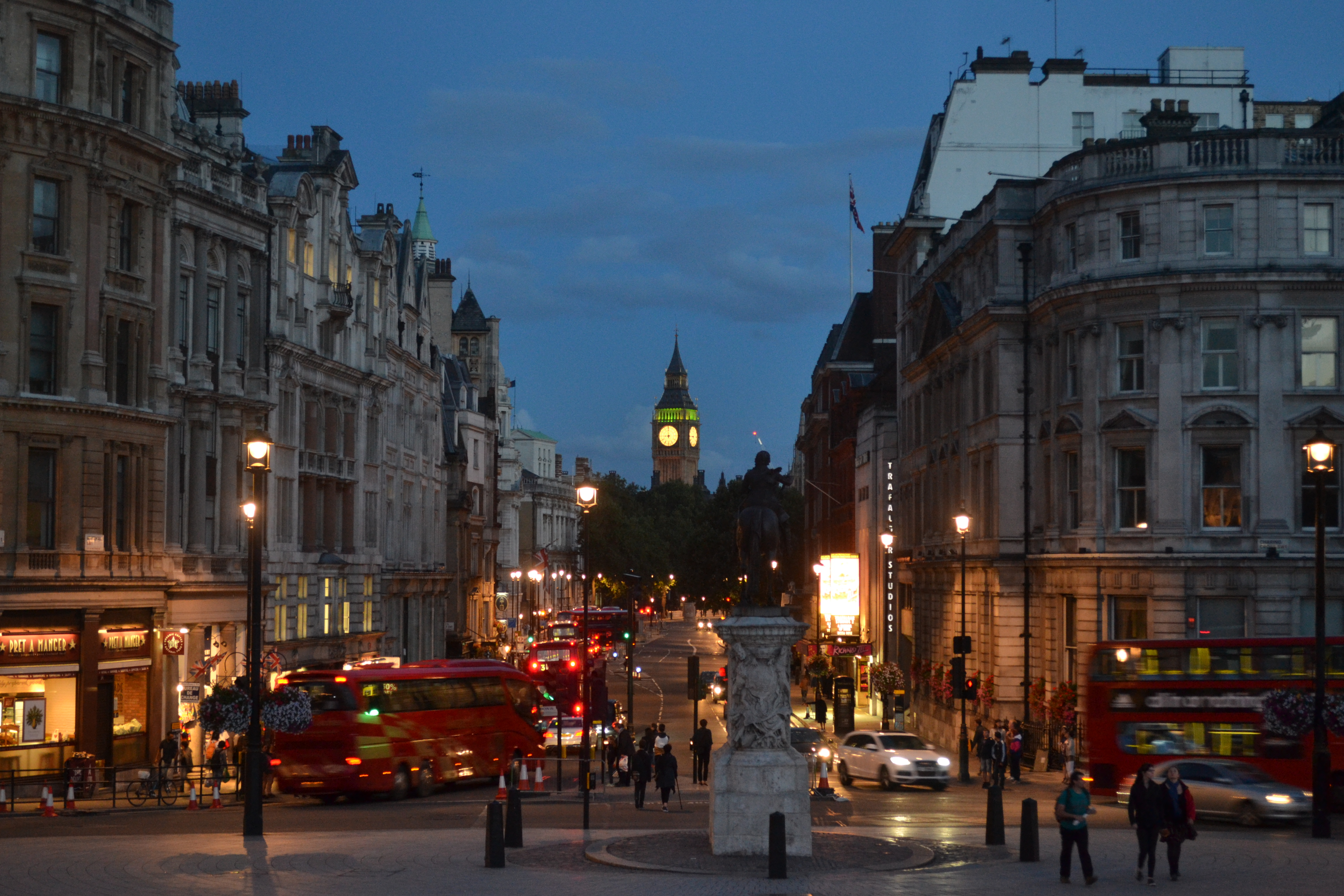
Whitehall hosts the major offices of the British government, led by cabinet ministers. Facing towards Big Ben is a statue of Charles I, who was executed in 1649 for denying the rights of Parliament.

Although the Prime Minister is the head of Parliament, Her Majesty's Government is formed by a larger group of Members of Parliament, or peers. The "cabinet" is a still smaller group of 22 or 23 people, though only twenty ministers may be paid. Each minister typically heads a Department or Ministry, which can be created or renamed by prerogative. Cabinet committees are usually organised by the Prime Minister. Every minister is expected to follow collective responsibility, and the Ministerial Code 2010. This includes rules that Ministers are "expected to behave in a way that upholds the highest standards of propriety", "give accurate and truthful information to Parliament", resign if they "knowingly mislead Parliament", to be "as open as possible", have no possible conflicts of interest and give a full list of interests to a permanent secretary, and only "remain in office for so long as they retain the confidence of the Prime Minister". Assisting ministers is a modern civil service and network of government bodies, who are employed at the pleasure of the Crown. The Civil Service Code requires civil servants to show "high standards of behaviour", uphold core values of "integrity, honesty, objectivity and impartiality", and never put themselves in a position that "might reasonably be seen to compromise their personal judgment or integrity". Since the Freedom of Information Act 2000, it has been expected that government should be open about information, and should disclose it upon a request unless disclosure would compromise personal data, security or may run against the public interest. In this way the trend has been to more open, transparent and accountable governance.

=== Public services and enterprise ===
Public services and enterprise aim to protect the well-being of people in the UK. They create most social and economic rights in practice, which generally match government departments, particularly in nine main enterprises of education, health, full employment and social security, clean energy, housing, food and water, transport infrastructure, communications, a deliberative media, and security. Funding for public services comes from a range of taxes, mainly on workers' incomes and consumption (rather than capital), levied through annual budgets and Appropriate Acts, organised by HM Treasury. The UK has not yet developed a coherent approach to its public services, with a clear set of universal basic services free at the point of use, even though this is calculated to be cheaper to run than systems of prices and private ownership.

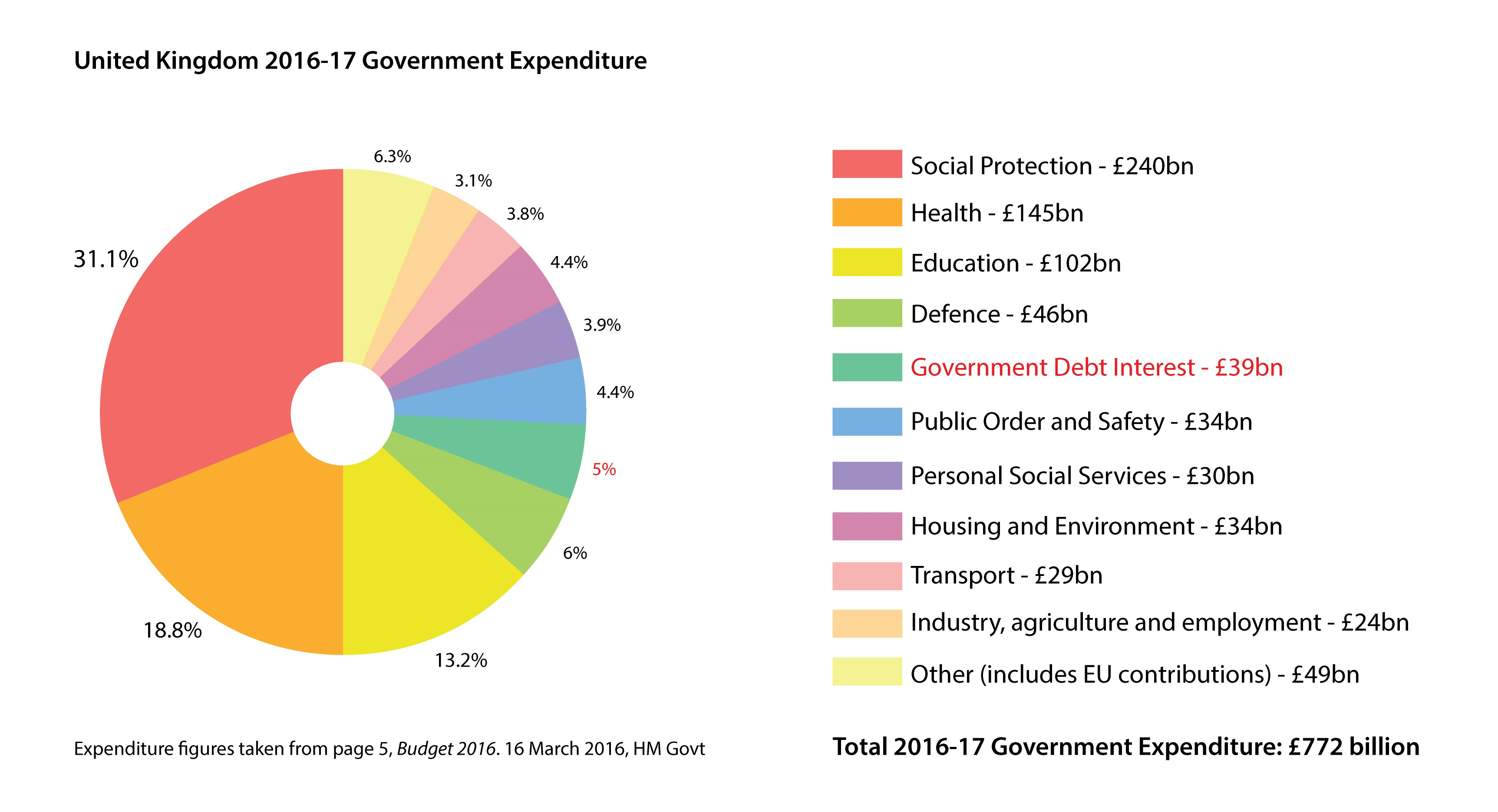
British central government expenditure, 2016-17. Social protection includes pensions and welfare.

First, the UK does not yet have a "National Education Service", but instead the Department for Education oversees a splintered system of nurseries, schools and universities. Around 70% of nurseries are controlled by private entities, which tend to have higher fees, pay lower wages and have less parental involvement than non-profit nurseries. There is a right to 30 hours of government subsidised childcare after 3 years old, lowering to 9 months old from 2025. Schools are mostly public, while 6.5% of students attend fee-paying schools that refuse access to children who do not have parents with money. Most children attend local authority maintained schools, academies and free schools, which are accessed freely. Local authority schools have governing bodies that typically include parents, the headteacher, staff, and council representatives. Universities are, since 2011, mainly funded by £9250 tuition fees from home students, and unlimited fees from international students, departing from the previous tradition of tuition free study and grants. The UK government also gives a limited sum of research funding through UK Research and Innovation, which is appointed by the Secretary of State, without any right of academics to vote. Governing bodies vary between Cambridge, Oxford, Scottish and London universities having a majority or high number elected by staff, while 46 newer universities are limited to two staff-elected members of their governing bodies. Second, the National Health Service Act 2006 codifies the rules of the UK's comprehensive health service, free at the point of use. Yet since 2012 the NHS has increased the 2% cap on private work done by NHS trusts to 49%, had more outsourcing, and private finance in buildings, coinciding with stagnating life expectancy. Where people are not paying privately, the Department of Health and Social Care distributes money to NHS England (or Scottish, Welsh and Irish counterparts), which in turn distributes money (among others) to General Practitioner doctors, and 42 Integrated Care Boards that in turn distribute funds to NHS trusts that run hospitals. GP surgeries are typically partnerships of self-employed doctors, while NHS foundation trusts that run most hospitals have a Council of Governors where three to one-half are employee elected, one by local authorities, one by any nearby university, but the rest typically appointed by the incumbent board. Third, the responsibility for overall economic management that underpins full employment and social security is split between HM Treasury, the Bank of England, and the Department for Work and Pensions. While HM Treasury ultimately sets economic policy, including fiscal policy, that will affect the investment for jobs, the Bank of England Act 1998 states that the Bank determines monetary policy independently. The Bank's board is appointed by the government without any formal requirement for labour or regional representation, and it carries out monetary policy mainly by changing the interest rate it charges to private banks, which in turn affects overall levels of borrowing, and in turn private investment, and in turn employment, or possibly inflation. The Bank also supervises private banks, and jointly regulates their practices such as guaranteeing fair loans and consumer bank accounts. Social security, including Jobseeker's Allowance and the State Pension, is administered by the Department for Work and Pensions. Its finance ultimately depends on the extent to which Treasury achieves full employment with fair wages and working time, thus reducing the cost of unemployment benefit claims, and ensuring better funding for pensions.

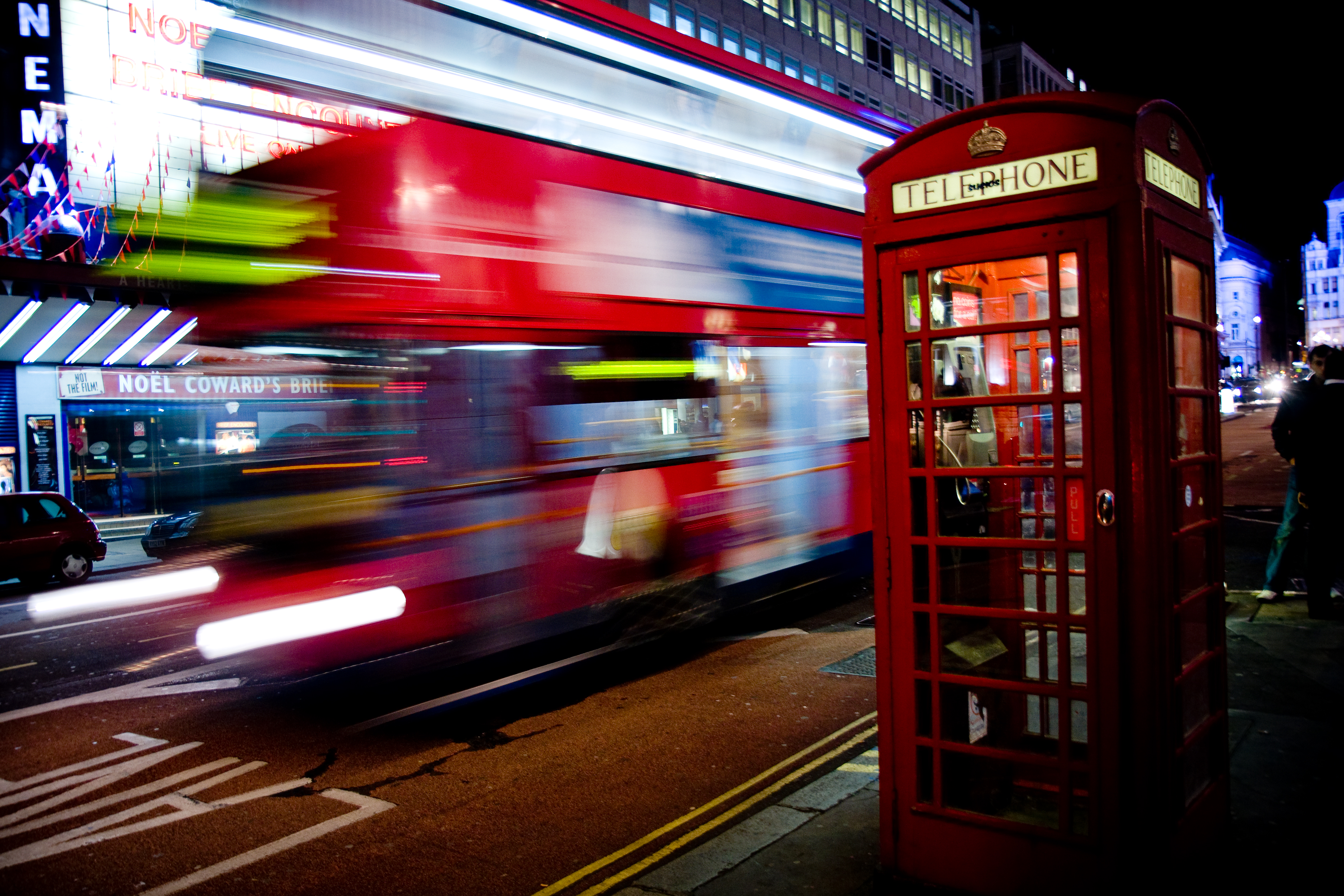
Public services and enterprise, such as bus and communication networks, are overseen by the UK government, although many have been privatised, raising bills and prices.

Fourth among major public services is energy, overseen by the Department for Energy Security and Net Zero. Despite the Climate Change Act 2008 requiring an end to greenhouse gas emissions by 2050, the Oil and Gas Authority and Coal Authority continue to license fossil fuel extraction, and since 2015 the OGA has a duty to "maximise the economy recovery of oil". Electricity is transmitted and distributed around the UK by National Grid plc, which (despite being a natural monopoly) was sold to private shareholders after the Electricity Act 1989, as were the generating companies of UK energy. Six big companies held 70% of the market in 2022, namely British Gas, SSE, Scottish Power, EdF, and Ovo, although the growth of renewable energy has enabled working competition from household solar, clean generating firms such as Octopus Energy, or public providers such as London Power. The Gas and Electricity Markets Authority (known as Ofgem) oversees the whole sector, entirely appointed by the Secretary of State, who can give directions, including capping prices. Ofgem's main function is to license large energy companies, and ensure they abide by the standard licence conditions. Fifth, housing is overseen by the Department for Levelling Up, Housing and Communities, but there was a sharp decline in building affordable homes, and no fair rent rules since the Housing Act 1985. Sixth, the Department for Environment, Food, and Rural Affairs oversees the food and water sectors. Farming was subsidised by the EU Common Agricultural Policy, but now this is being replaced by a UK system with wide discretion to make payments for environmental or farm support criteria. Unlike nearly all other countries, England's water system was privatised, and the Water Industry Act 1991 merely established a regulator, Ofwat that is meant to promote competition to protect consumers, despite each water company being a natural monopoly. Scottish Water, by contrast, remains public, and Welsh Water is non-profit, each having lower bills and cleaner rivers and beaches than in England. Seventh, the Department for Transport manages rail and road networks through spending on infrastructure, and the Secretary's appointment of the Office of Rail and Road. Both rail and buses in England are banned from being owned by UK public bodies (outside London, and with some exceptions), even though foreign governments can and do own many rail and bus companies. Eighth, communications and media are overseen by the Department for Culture, Media and Sport and Ofcom, whose directors are appointed by the Secretary of State. Ofcom regulates TV and radio for fairness and accuracy and has licensing powers, but has not used its powers to regulate broadcasting on the internet, and has no power so far to regulate print media. The British Broadcasting Corporation and Channel 4 are publicly owned media networks, funded by a licence fee (BBC) and advertising (C4). Ofcom also licences internet broadband companies, which are nearly all private. Ninth, the Ministry of Defence controls the army, navy and air force with a strict line of command and discipline. The Home Office, often jointly with elected mayors, controls the police.

=== Regional government ===
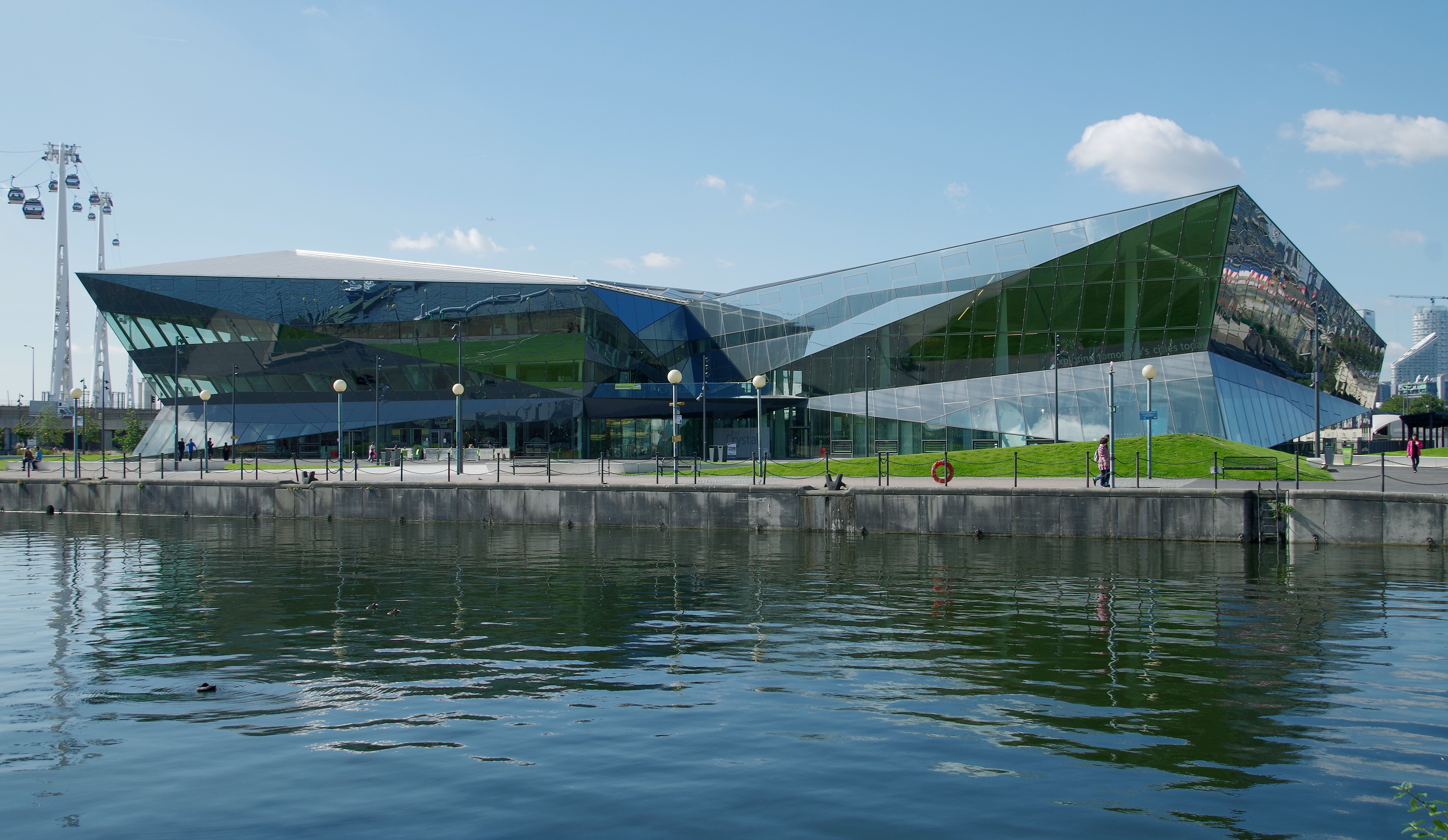
The London Assembly and Mayor of London work at City Hall. The only region of England with representation, it has limited powers including over transport, the environment and housing.

The constitution of British regional governments is an uncodified patchwork of authorities, mayors, councils and devolved government. In Wales, Scotland, Northern Ireland and London unified district or borough councils have local government powers, and since 1998 to 2006 new regional assemblies or Parliaments exercise extra powers devolved from Westminster. In England, there are 55 unitary authorities in the larger towns (e.g. Bristol, Brighton, Milton Keynes) and 36 metropolitan boroughs (surrounding Liverpool, Manchester, Leeds, Birmingham, Sheffield, and Newcastle) which function as unitary local authorities.

In other parts of England, local government is split between two tiers of authority: 32 larger County Councils, and within those 192 District Councils, each sharing different functions. Since 1994, England has had eight regions for administrative purposes at Whitehall, yet these have no regional government or democratic assembly (like in London, Scotland, Wales or Northern Ireland) after a 2004 referendum on a North East Assembly failed. This means that England has among the most centralised, and disunified systems of governance in the Commonwealth or Europe.

While eight in England remain unrepresented, in the twelve regions of the UK, Scotland, Northern Ireland, Wales and London have their own Parliaments or Assemblies. Each have varying powers, for instance, over transport, the environment, housing, and some limited parts of labour rights, and tax.

Three main issues in local government are the authorities' financing, their powers, and the reform of governance structures. First, councils raise revenue from council tax (charged on local residents according to property values in 1993) and business rates charged on businesses with operations in the locality. These powers are, compared to other countries, extreme in limiting local government autonomy, and taxes can be subjected to a local referendum if the Secretary of State determines they are excessive. In real terms since 2010, central government cut local council funding by nearly 50 per cent, and real spending fell by 21 per cent, as councils failed to make up cuts through business rates. Unitary authorities and district councils are responsible for administering council tax and business rates. The duties of local governments are also extremely limited compared to other countries, but also uncodified so that in 2011 the Department for Communities and Local Government enumerated 1340 specific duties of local authorities. Generally, the Localism Act 2011 section 1 states local authorities may do anything an individual person may do, unless prohibited by law, but this provision has little effect because human beings or companies cannot tax or regulate other people in the way that governments must. The Local Government Act 1972 section 101 says that a local authority can discharge its functions through a committee or any officer, and can transfer functions to another authority, while section 111 gives authorities the power to do any thing including spending or borrowing 'which is calculated to facilitate, or is conducive or incidental to, the discharge of any of their functions'. However the real duties of local council are found in hundreds of scattered Acts and statutory instruments. These include duties to administer planning consent, to carry out compulsory purchasing according to law, to administer school education, libraries, care for children, roads or highway maintenance and local buses, provide care for the elderly and disabled, prevent pollution and ensure clean air, ensure collection, recycling and disposal of waste, regulate building standards, provide social and affordable housing, and shelters for the homeless. Local authorities do not yet have powers common in other countries, such as setting minimum wages, regulating rents, or borrowing and taxing as is necessary in the public interest, which frustrates objectives of pluralism, localism and autonomy. Since 2009, authorities have been empowered to merge into 'combined authorities' and to have an elected mayor. This has been done around Manchester, Sheffield, Liverpool, Newcastle, Leeds, Birmingham, the Tees Valley, Bristol and Peterborough. The functions of an elected mayor are not substantial, but can include those of Police and Crime Commissioners.

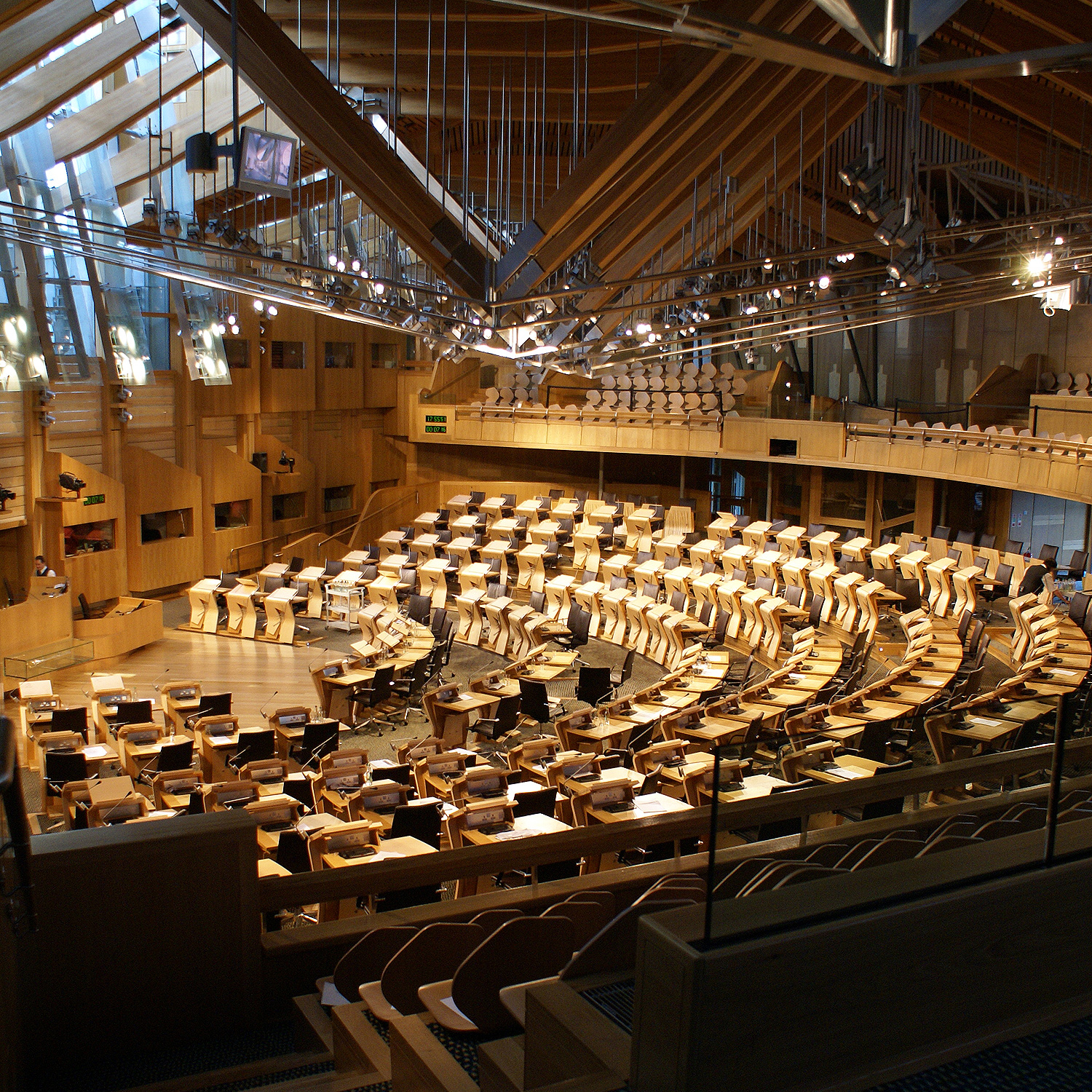
The Scottish Parliament at Holyrood has 129 MSPs with extensive powers, including taxation.

In Scotland, Wales, Northern Ireland and London there are also regional assemblies and Parliaments, similar to state or provincial governments in other countries. The extent of devolution differs in each place. The Scotland Act 1998 created a unicameral Scottish Parliament with 129 elected members each four years: 73 from single member constituencies with simple majority vote, and 56 from additional member systems of proportional representation. Under section 28, the Scottish Parliament can make any laws except for on 'reserved matters' listed in Schedule 5. These powers, reserved for the UK Parliament, include foreign affairs, defence, finance, economic planning, home affairs, trade and industry, social security, employment, broadcasting, and equal opportunities. By convention, members of the British Parliament from Scottish constituencies do not vote on issues that the Scottish Parliament has exercised power over. This is the most powerful regional government so far. The Northern Ireland Act 1998 lists which matters are transferred, but the Northern Ireland Assembly has been suspended since 2017 because of basic disagreements among its members, stemming from long-standing violence and civil conflict, before a delicate peace deal was brokered in the Good Friday Agreement. The Government of Wales Act 2006 requires a 40-member assembly with elections each four years, and sets out in Schedule 5 twenty fields of government competence, with some exceptions. The fields include agriculture, fisheries, forestry and rural development, economic development, school education, environmental policy, highways and transport, housing, planning, and some aspects of social welfare. The Supreme Court has tended to interpret these powers in favour of devolution.

== Human rights ==
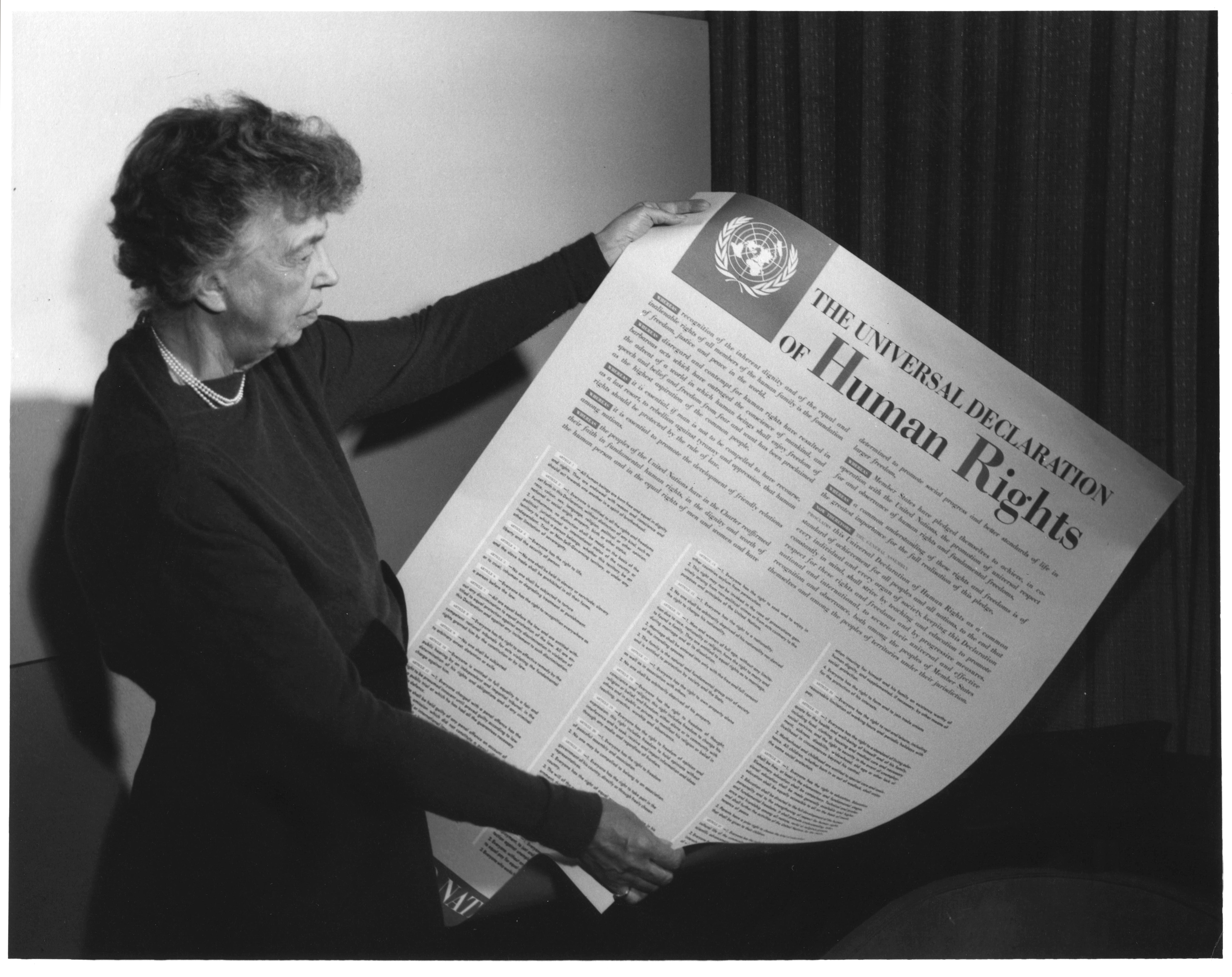
Eleanor Roosevelt, one of its drafters, said the Universal Declaration of Human Rights "may well become the international Magna Carta" when it was released in 1948. The Universal Declaration was recast in two International Covenants in 1966, treaties ratified by the UK.

Codification of human rights is recent, but before the Human Rights Act 1998 and the European Convention on Human Rights, British law had one of the world's longest human rights traditions. Magna Carta bound the King to require Parliament's consent before any tax, respect the right to a trial "by lawful judgment of his Peers, or by the Law of the Land", stated that "We will sell to no man, we will not deny or defer to any man either Justice or Right", guaranteed free movement for people, and preserved common land for everyone. After the English Civil War the Bill of Rights 1689 in England and Wales, and the Claim of Rights Act 1689 in Scotland, enshrined principles of representative democracy, no tax without Parliament, freedom of speech in Parliament, and no "cruel and unusual punishment". By 1789, these ideas evolved and inspired both the US Bill of Rights, and the Declaration of the Rights of Man and of the Citizen after the American and French Revolutions.

Although some labelled natural rights as "nonsense upon stilts", more legal rights were slowly developed by Parliament and the courts. In 1792, Mary Wollstonecraft began the British movement for women's rights and equality, while movements behind the Tolpuddle martyrs and the Chartists drove reform for labour and democratic freedom. Upon the catastrophe of World War II and the Holocaust, the new international law order put the Universal Declaration of Human Rights 1948 at its centre, enshrining civil, political, economic, social and cultural rights. In 1950, the UK co-authored the European Convention on Human Rights, enabling people to appeal to the European Court of Human Rights in Strasbourg even against Acts of Parliament: Parliament has always undertaken to comply with basic principles of international law. Because this appeals process was long, Parliament legislated to "bring rights home" with the Human Rights Act 1998, so that people can raise human rights claims in British courts based on the Convention directly. The Convention contains the rights to life, rights against torture, against forced labour, to marry, to an effective remedy, and the right to suffer no discrimination in those rights. Most case law concerns the rights to liberty, privacy, freedom of conscience and expression, and to freedom of association and assembly. The UK also enshrines rights to fair labour standards, social security, and a multitude of social and economic rights through its legislation.

=== Liberty and a fair trial ===
The right to liberty of the person, to be free from the domination or servitude of others, and only to lose one's liberty 'by lawful judgment of his Peers, or by the Law of the Land' has been fundamental to the UK's and English law since Magna Carta. This said, slavery and serfdom took until the 16th century to break down in England, and was maintained at least until 1833 within the British Empire, before full abolition of forced labour was passed, extending the writ of habeas corpus (the right to one's own body) to everyone. Benjamin Franklin's adage, that people who sacrifice liberty for security will lose both and deserve neither, is reflected in human rights law. Like international law, the European Convention on Human Rights article 5 states no 'one shall be deprived of [their] liberty' unless law expressly allows that person's detention after conviction, a lawful arrest or detention on suspicion of an offence, detention of a minor for education, detention for health or stopping infectious diseases spreading, or for lawful deportation or extradition. People must be told reasons for any detention, be put on trial in a reasonable time, or released immediately with compensation if detention was unlawful. Article 6 requires a fair trial, with a presumption of innocence, and legal aid if justice requires it, according to principles of natural justice. Article 7 prohibits criminal offences applying retroactively to acts done before something was made criminal. In practice, every power of the police or the state to maintain order and security 'inevitably means a corresponding reduction in the liberty of the individual', and the UK has among the highest spending on policing in the world. For this reason the Police and Criminal Evidence Act 1984, and the limits to police powers, is a key legislative guardian of liberty in the UK today.

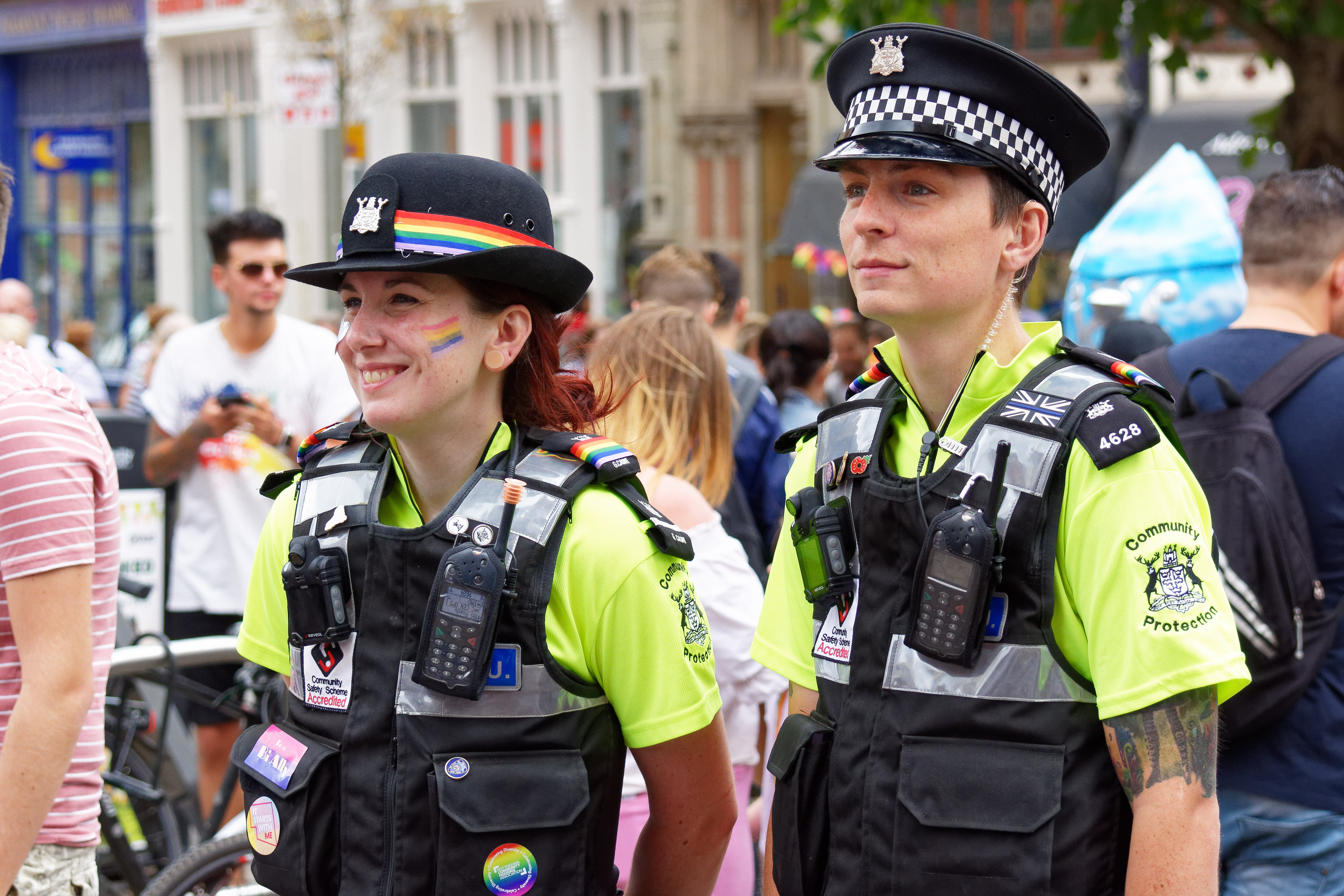
Chief constables can grant limited powers to community support officers including giving a fixed penalty notice, but not the wider search or arrest powers of police.

Three main issues of police power and liberty are (1) powers of arrest, detention and questioning, (2) powers to enter, search or seize property, and (3) the accountability of the police for abuse of power. First, the Police and Criminal Evidence Act 1984 section 1 allows a constable to stop and search people if a constable 'has reasonable grounds for suspecting' that they will 'find stolen or prohibited articles', they may seize the articles, and they may use reasonable force. The constable must give their name, police station, and grounds for the search. People cannot be made to remove clothing in public, except an outer coat, jacket or gloves. Because of the widespread problem of race discrimination in stop and search, the Home Office Code A says that 'reasonable suspicion cannot be based on generalisations or stereotypical images' of people being involved in crime. It was formerly seen as 'contrary to constitutional principle' to search someone to find whether or not there are grounds for arrest. But since 1994, there is no need for police to show reasonable suspicion to search someone to prevent violence or the carrying of offensive weapons. In 2015 the Supreme Court held suspicionless searches were held to be compatible with ECHR article 5. Under section 24, constables can arrest people without a warrant if they are committing an offence, or if there are reasonable grounds for suspecting they will. The meaning of 'reasonable grounds' is not exacting, but a police officer must not arrest someone in bad faith, or irrationally, or if a suspect is cooperating and arrest is therefore unnecessary. Otherwise, a justice of the peace may issue a warrant for arrest, require attendance at court, in writing, and it can be executed by a constable. With a warrant, a constable can enter and search premises to make an arrest, or enter and search after an arrest. In addition, any person can make a 'citizens' arrest of another person who is in the act of committing an indictable offence. Anyone being arrested mus be told the fact of arrest, and the reasons, or be told as soon as practicable, and if they are not the arrest is unlawful. People who are arrested must be brought to a police station as soon as practicable, and there must either be released, charged or detained for questioning. People can only be detained without charge for 24 hours, but this can be extended to 36 hours for an indictable offence, or another 36 hours (i.e. 72 hours in total) but only with approval of a magistrate's court where the detainee has a right to legal representation. People can be searched at a police station with an inspector's authority, but can only do intimate searches of orifices if there are reasonable grounds for thinking there is a class A drug or article that could cause injury. A detainee has the right to inform a friend or relative, and consult a solicitor, but this right can be delayed by 36 hours if arrested for an indictable offence or 48 hours for terrorism. Interviews should be recorded, people can be photographed and drug tested without their consent. 'Intimate' samples of bodily fluids, blood and swabs cannot be taken without consent, but courts may draw adverse inferences. When being questioned by police, it is acknowledged that the right to silence is ultimately 'at the heart' of a fair trial, and 'particular caution [is] required before a domestic court [should] invoke an accused's silence against him.' No statement or confession is admissible unless it is voluntarily given. A clear exception, however, is that a vehicle owner can be required to reveal the identity of a driver, and this does not breach ECHR article 6.

'The great end, for which men entered into society, was to secure their property. That right is preserved sacred and incommunicable in all instances, where it has not been taken away or abridged by some public law... wherein every man by common consent gives up that right, for the sake of justice and the general good. By the laws of England, every invasion of private property, be it ever so minute, is a trespass. No man can set his foot upon my ground without my licence, but he is liable to an action, though the damage be nothing... If no excuse can be found or produced, the silence of the books is an authority against the defendant, and the plaintiff must have judgment.'

— Entick v Carrington [1765] EWHC KB J98, Lord Camden CJ

Second, police officers have no right to trespass upon property without a lawful warrant, because as Lord Camden said in Entick v Carrington by 'the law of England every invasion of private property, be it ever so minute, is a trespass.' Here a sheriff searched and seized property at the home of a journalist, John Entick, but the 'warrant' used by the sheriff had no legal basis. The Court held that the sheriff had to pay damages. Today, under the Police and Criminal Evidence Act 1984 section 8 enables officers to enter premises and search but only based on a warrant granted by a justice of the peace. There is no right to search communications between lawyer and a client, or confidential personal records, some medical materials, and confidential journalistic material, unless there is an order of a judge. A common law power to enter premises to stop a breach of peace was held in McLeod v UK to have unjustifiably violated the right to privacy under ECHR article 8, because the police used it to help an ex-husband recover property when an ex-wife was absent from a home. Under section 19, an officer can seize material if they have reasonable grounds to believe it was obtained by committing an offence, or if it is evidence, but not if it is subject to legal privilege. Third, although 'the law does not encourage' someone to 'resist the authority of... an officer of the law', there is an inherent right to resist an unlawful arrest, but it is an offence to resist a lawful arrest. By contrast, before being formally arrested, in R v Iqbal a man accused of drug offences was detained and handcuffed by police while attending a friend's trial, but before being arrested he broke free and escaped. He was caught again, and convicted for escaping lawful custody, but the Lord Chief Justice overturned the conviction because there was no lawful arrest, and the offence could not be widened 'by making it apply to those whose arrest has been deliberately postponed.' Anyone can bring a claim against police for unlawful conduct, the chief constable is vicariously liable for constables' conduct, and exemplary damages are available for 'oppressive, arbitrary or unconstitutional actions'. Evidence illegally obtained, such as a confession, and certainly anything through 'torture, inhuman or degrading treatment and the use or threat of violence' must be excluded, and a court can refuse evidence if it would have an adverse effect on the fairness of proceedings. Since 2011, Police and Crime Commissioners are directly elected in England and Wales (on low turnouts) and have a duty to 'secure that the police force is efficient and effective'. The Home Secretary is meant to issue a 'strategic policing document' that chief constables pay regard to, but can intervene and require 'special measures' if there is mismanagement. This means the Home Secretary is ultimately politically responsible, but administration is largely local. Commissioners have a duty to enforce the law, but decisions about how to allocate scarce resources mean that police forces can choose to prioritise tackling some kinds of crime (e.g. violence) over others (e.g. drugs). Generally police forces will not be liable in tort for failing to stop criminal acts, but positive duties do exist to take preventative measures or properly investigate allegations.

=== Privacy ===
The constitutional importance of privacy, of one's home, belongings, and correspondence, has been recognised since 1604, when Sir Edward Coke wrote that the 'house of every one is to him as his castle and fortress'. While rights to liberty and a fair trial also protect against unjustified search or seizure, the European Convention on Human Rights article 8 enshrines the right to one's 'private and family life', 'home' and 'correspondence' unless interference is 'in accordance with the law' and 'necessary in a democratic society' for public security, safety, economic well-being, preventing crime, protecting health or morals or rights of others. The law of trespass, as in Entick v Carrington, traditionally protected against unjustified physical violations of people's homes, but given extensive powers of entry, and with modern information technology the central concerns of privacy are electronic surveillance, both by the state and by private corporations aiming to profit from data or 'surveillance capitalism'. The four main fields of law relating to privacy concern (1) listening devices and interference with private property, (2) interception of mail, email or web communications by government, (3) mass data storage and processing by corporations or state bodies, and (4) other breaches of confidence and privacy, particularly by the press.

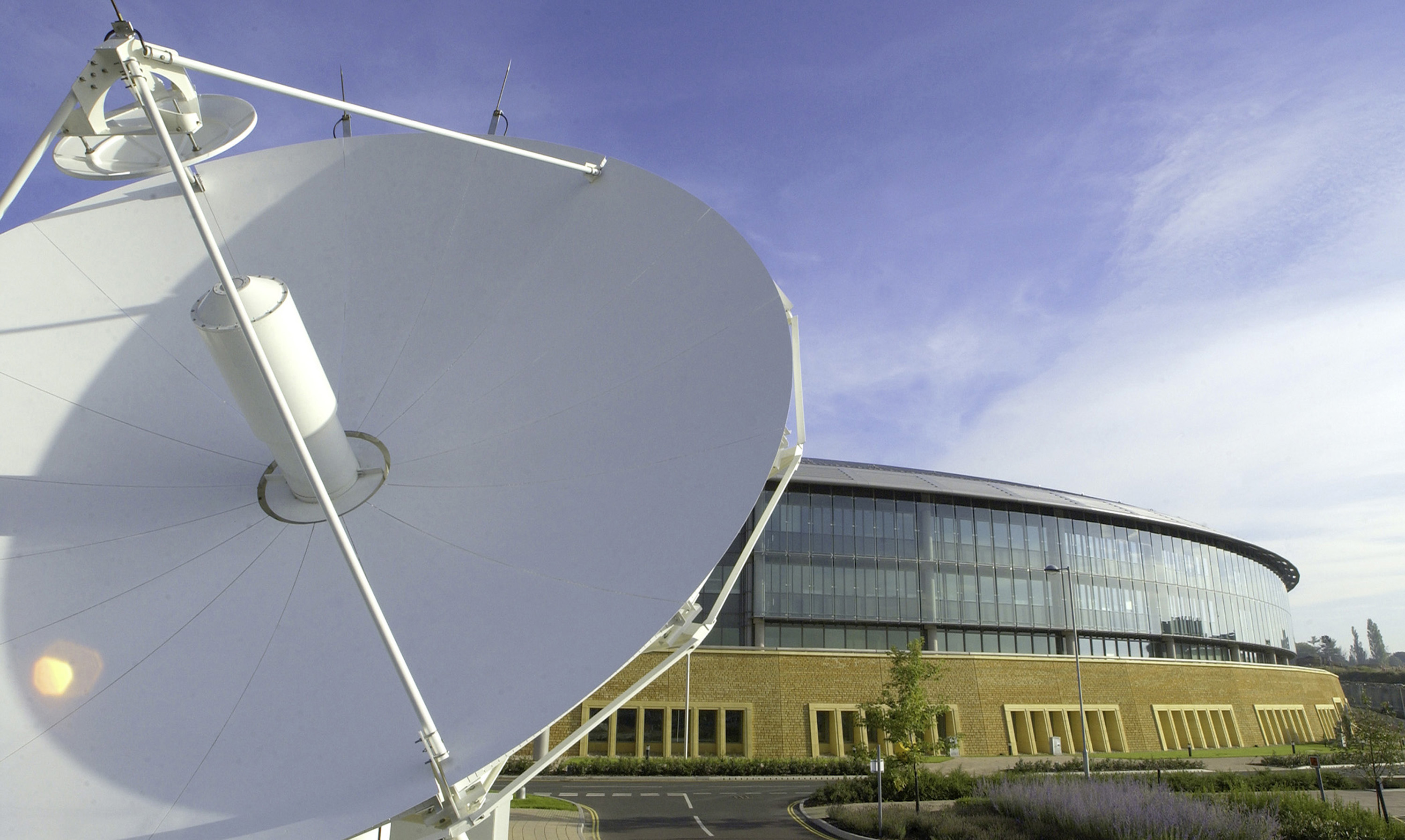
Government Communications HQ, part of British intelligence, is among the public bodies which can apply for warrants to put people under surveillance to detect serious crime. With the Investigatory Powers Act 2016 these powers have steadily grown.

First, the Police Act 1997 sections 92 prohibits 'interference with property or with wireless telegraphy' without authorisation by a chief constable or others. Such listening or bugging devices may only be used 'for the prevention or detection of serious crime' that could lead to over 3 years of jail. A judicial commissioner's approval is further needed if a dwelling, bedroom or office is being bugged, and if refused the police can appeal to the Investigatory Powers Commissioner. On top of this, the Regulation of Investigatory Powers Act 2000 which also generally allows surveillance by police, intelligence, HMRC and councils to obtain private information ('directed'), or surveillance of a residence or vehicle ('intrusive') if for the purpose of national security, preventing serious crime, or protecting British economic well-being. Only 'intrusive' surveillance requires approval by a judicial commissioner. This has frequently led to abuse, for instance, in one case with a family being put under surveillance to see if they lived in a catchment area of an oversubscribed school, and in another an intelligence officer infiltrating a protest group and fathering a child, after taking a dead child's identity. Surveillance in public places does not engage the human right to privacy, according to Kinloch v HM Advocate, where evidence of the defendant money laundering was gathered by police following the suspect in public spaces. Second, although the Investigatory Powers Act 2016 section 2 creates a duty to consider whether means less intrusive to privacy could be used, warrants can be issue for targeted or bulk interception of any data, including to assist other governments, but only to detect serious crime, protect national security, or protect the UK's economic well-being, and this must be proportionate. Applications are made to the Home Secretary or other appropriate ministers, and must be approved by a judicial commissioner with written reasons for any refusal. Warrants can also be issued against Members of Parliament with the consent of the prime minister. Interception should not be disclosed in judicial proceedings. Local councils are able to carry out interceptions, albeit with authority of a justice of the peace. Journalists' material can be intercepted, though only with authority of a judicial commissioner. The government can also require internet service providers retain data, including bulk data, for up to a year. Judicial commissioners must have held high judicial office, while the Investigatory Powers Commissioner audits, inspects and investigates the exercise of public body powers. In 2015, over 3059 warrants were granted, and it is argued by MI5 that bulk data enables security services to 'make the right connections between disparate pieces of information'. The fact of bulk data collection, however, inevitably means people who have nothing to do with serious crime remain under state surveillance.

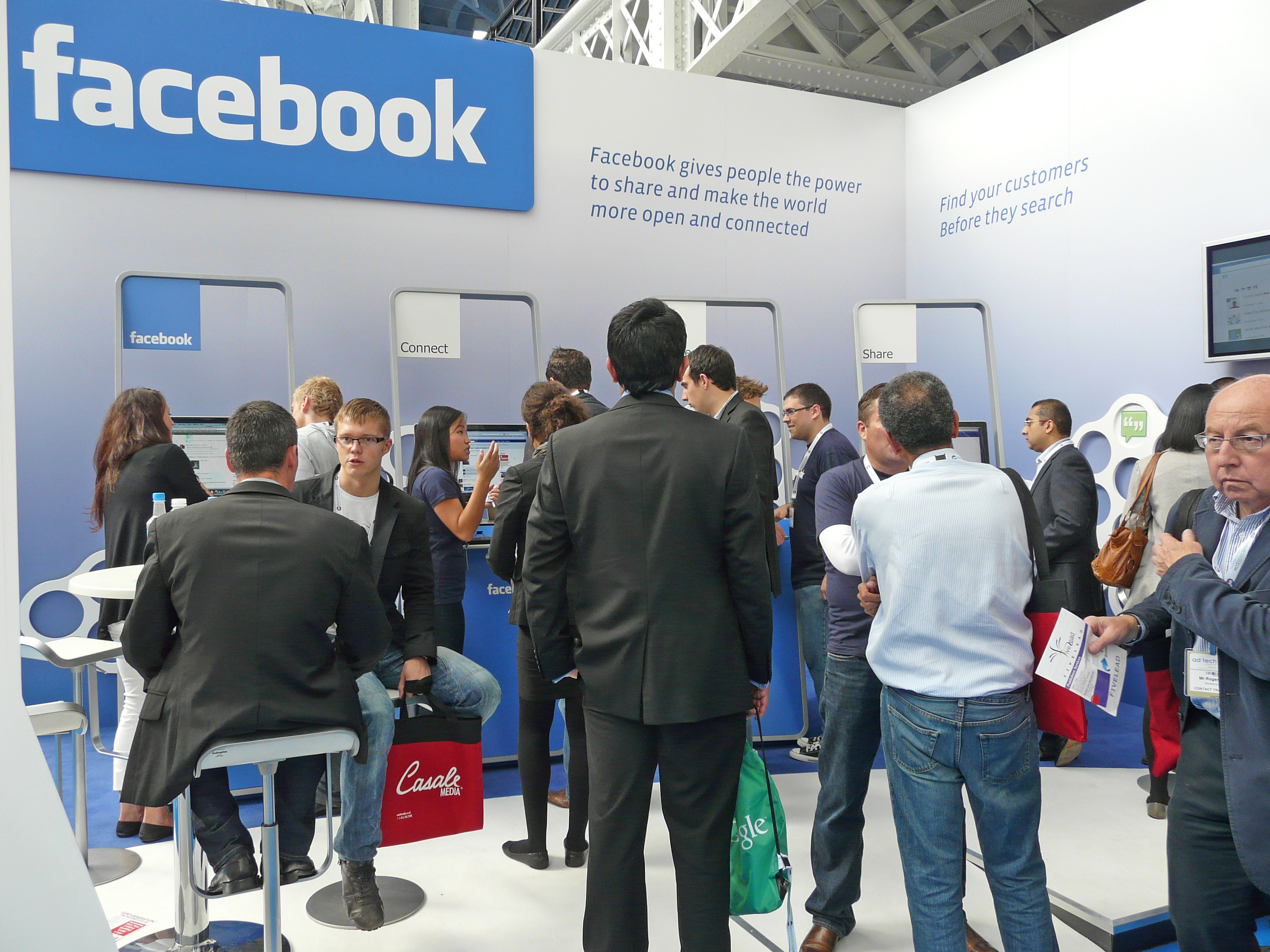
The world's biggest tech corporations, particularly Facebook, Google, Amazon, Microsoft and Apple have vast databases on user behaviour. In 2016, a scandal broke as it was found Facebook and other data was illegally taken and used for psychologically targeted adverts in the 2016 Brexit poll. The GDPR 2016 creates minimal data rights.

Third, it has been recognised that the 'right to keep oneself to oneself, to tell other people that certain things are none of their business, is under technological threat' also from private corporations, as well as the state. Through standard form contracts, tech corporations routinely appropriate users' private data for targeted advertising, particularly Google (e.g. search and browsing history, email, locations), Facebook (e.g. personal interactions, hobbies, messages), Microsoft (e.g. emails, or cloud documents) and others. Because people have no choice but to agree to the terms and conditions, consent is defective and contract terms are often unfair, legislation has been increasing in strength to reflect the fundamental 'right to the protection of personal data' in the European Union. The General Data Protection Regulation 2016 requires that all data is processed lawfully, fairly and transparently, and on the basis of 'consent' or a contract. The meaning of 'consent' requires more than the basic rules for commercial contracts, and must be clearly and distinctly identifiable, and revocable at any time. Contract terms may be subject to more protective rights contained in British law. Whenever a 'data subject' has personal data processed or stored, they have basic rights to be provided with transparent information about the data stored including when they have not given that information themselves, to access the data and rectify any inaccuracies, and to demand that the data is erased when it is no longer necessary for the purpose for which it was originally given. There is a further right that data must be portable 'to another controller without hindrance', for instance in switching phone contacts. Data may be disclosed for legitimate reasons, so in Rugby Football Union v Consolidated Information Services Ltd the Supreme Court held that a ticketing agency had no data protection defence against disclosing information to the Rugby Football Union about people who touted tickets against its rules, because the legitimate interest in stopping theft was stronger. Article 32 states a data controller must ensure the security of people's data, and notify supervisory authorities of any breach, including transfers to 'third countries' where the rule of law is defective. However, during the 2016 Brexit referendum the House of Commons fake news committee found that Facebook enabled massive breaches of users' data, being sold onto third parties including Cambridge Analytica, which psychologically targeted voters with political adverts, and this data spread into Russia. The penalties for breach of GDPR rules, since it came into force in May 2018, can be up to 4% of a company's worldwide turnover, or €20m, whichever is higher. There are also databases kept by British state bodies, including the National Domestic Extremism Database, a DNA Database, and a Police National Computer, Related to this, the Supreme Court held in R(L) v Metropolitan Police Commissioner that there was no breach of privacy when a primary school's enhanced criminal record check on an applicant for a teaching assistant job showed the applicant's son was put on a child protection register because of neglect, and she was refused a job. A planned NHS patients' database, care.data, was abandoned because of protests about confidentiality and security of data. Finally, claimants may sue any private party on the grounds of breach of confidence, an old equitable action, although one that may be giving way to a tort of misuse of private information. For instance, it was held that it was an unlawful breach of privacy for the Daily Mail to publish private journals of the Prince of Wales about the handover of Hong Kong to China stolen and leaked by a former employee. It was also held to be unlawful for a newspaper to publish details of an applicant's private sexual life, even though in other countries the story had spread around the internet, because there was no 'public interest... in the disclosure or publication of purely private sexual encounters, even though they involve adultery or more than one person at the same time'. In this way the common law has developed to uphold human rights.

=== Conscience and expression ===
The rights to freedom of conscience, and freedom of expression, are generally seen as being the 'lifeblood of democracy.' The trial and executions of Socrates in ancient Athens for 'corrupting the youth', of Jesus Christ in ancient Rome for blasphemy and sedition, of Sir Thomas More for refusing to bless Henry VIII's remarriage and split from the Catholic Church, or the house arrest of Galileo Galilei in the Inquisition for heresy, exemplified how people's conscience and expression in the ancient and medieval worlds were crushed for challenging people in political and economic power. After the English Civil War, it was established that a jury could acquit a Quaker who preached to a crowd even against the judge's direction and 'against full and manifest evidence'. The Bill of Rights 1689 article 9 guaranteed the 'freedom of speech and debates or proceedings in Parliament' and stated they were 'not to be impeached or questioned in any court or place out of Parliament', but the first full, legal guarantees for free speech came from the American Revolution, when the First Amendment to the US Constitution guaranteed 'freedom of speech'. The government and employers suppressed free speech through the French revolution and after the Napoleonic wars, until the repeal of the anti-Catholic laws, and the abolition of restraints on trade union organising, as well as throughout the British Empire. But after World War II, the UK signed the Universal Declaration on Human Rights and joined the European Convention. Article 9 states that everyone has the right to freedom of conscience, including religion and belief. Only the manifestation of a belief can be limited on justifiable legal grounds as strictly necessary in a democracy. Article 10 enshrines the right to freedom of expression which includes the rights 'to hold opinions and to receive and impart information and ideas without interference by public authority and regardless of frontiers.' This does not prevent 'the licensing of broadcasting, television or cinema enterprises.' Like all other rights these are subject to restrictions set out in law, and as necessary in a democratic society, to stop crime, or protect security, territorial integrity, safety, health, morals, the rights of others, and to maintain the judiciary's impartiality. (Note: In international law, the duty to stop war propaganda and incitement of discrimination is made explicit.)

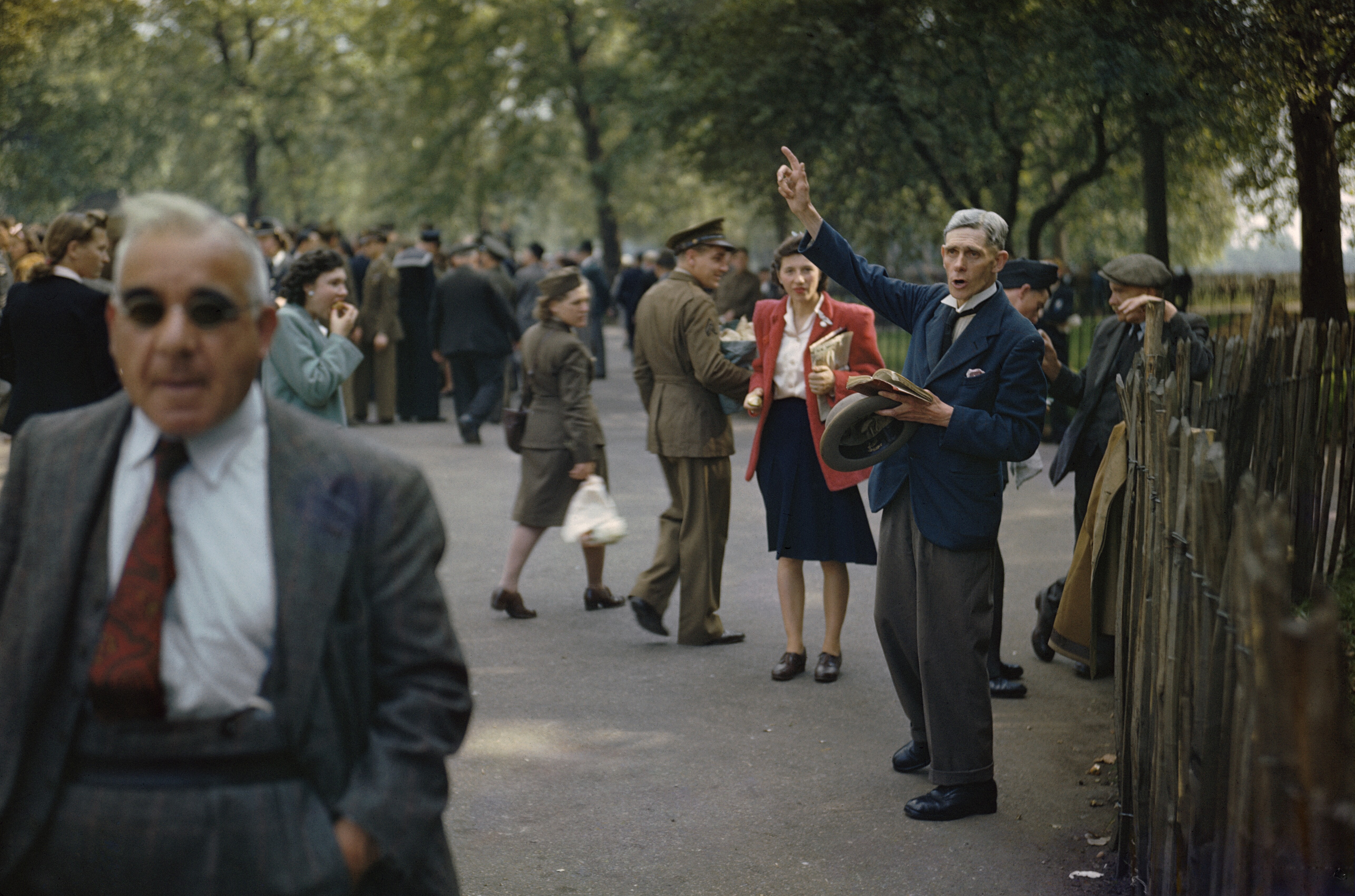
At Speakers' Corner of Hyde Park, London, here in 1944, people traditionally gather to exchange views, debate, and listen. Debating and free speech societies are found throughout the UK and regularly feature on TV. (Note: The oldest free speech and debating society in the world is Cogers (est 1755), while The Cambridge Union was established in 1815, and the Oxford Union in 1823. Most universities have student debating societies.)

The practical right to free expression is limited by (1) unaccountable ownership in the media, (2) censorship and obscenity laws, (3) public order offences, and (4) the law of defamation and breach of confidence. First, although anybody can stand on Speakers' Corner, in Parliament Square, or in Trafalgar Square and speak freely to a crowd, (Note: Generally the same laws apply to these places of free speech as in the whole country: see Redmond-Bate v DPP [2000] HRLR 249 (Speakers' Corner), Bailey v Williamson (1873) 8 QBD 118 (Hyde Park), and DPP v Haw [2007] EWHC 1931 (Admin).) the communication channels with the biggest audiences are owned by large corporate entities: three internet media networks, (Note: In 2019, these were: 1. YouTube and Google, owned by Alphabet, which is controlled by Larry Page and Sergey Brin; 2. Facebook, controlled by Mark Zuckerberg, and; 3. Twitter, controlled by Jack Dorsey.) five television networks, (Note: In 2019, these were: 1. the BBC, owned by an arms-length public corporation ultimately accountable to the UK government; 2. Channel 4, a public corporation set up under the Department for Culture, Media and Sport, 3. ITV, owned by asset managers such as Capital Group Companies, Ameriprise Financial and BlackRock; 4. Channel 5, owned by Viacom Inc, where 80% of votes on shares are controlled by Sumner Redstone, and; 5. Sky, owned by Comcast which is controlled by Brian L. Roberts.) and six corporate-owned newspaper groups, (Note: In 2019, the largest by website and circulation were: 1. the Daily Mail, Metro and Evening Standard, largely owned by Jonathan Harmsworth, 4th Viscount Rothermere through Daily Mail and General Trust plc, 2. The Times, and The Sun, controlled by Rupert Murdoch through Newscorp, 3. the Daily Mirror, Daily Express and Daily Star, controlled by Reach plc; 4. the Guardian and the Observer, owned by Scott Trust Limited which has a board must guard editorial independence, but which appoints itself, 5. the Daily Telegraph, controlled by the Barclay Brothers, and; 6. The Independent and The i, controlled by Alexander Lebedev (who also has a majority stake with Lord Rothermere in the Evening Standard.) almost all of which aim have shareholders that demand to make a profit. (Note: There is no formal legal duty to maximise shareholder returns under the Companies Act 2006 s 172, but in practice where shareholders monopolise votes to dismiss the board under CA 2006 s 168, this becomes the duty in practice, and the culture.) This means that most speech, with most reach, is designed to be compatible with generating advertising revenue and shareholder profit for the newspaper, TV, or Internet corporation, and controllers choose which speech or images are acceptable, unless the law creates different rights. While there are loose limits on cross-ownership of TV and newspapers, there is no regulation yet separate advertising business and internet media platforms where their interests conflict with public goals. The Communications Act 2003 sections 319-321, regulates television (but not explicitly Internet broadcasts, or newspapers) to ensure that diverse views are heard, and to restrict discriminatory viewing, or the stop misleading information, and allows a complaints procedure. (Note: This is detailed by the Ofcom Broadcasting Code (2017)) An Independent Press Standards Organisation operates for newspapers, but this has no publicly accountable legal basis after the industry chose to boycott one. The UK's transparent, and publicly accountable system of TV media regulation is consistently held to be compatible with freedom of expression. (Note: For example, R (Pro-Life Alliance) v BBC [2003] UKHL 23 finding that a ban on an anti-abortion group showing 'prolonged and deeply disturbing' images of an aborted foetus for a TV campaign advert did not violate ECHR article 10. cf R v Central Independent Television plc [1994] Fam 192) Two of the UK's TV networks, the BBC and Channel 4, are publicly owned and accountable, through an arm's length appointment process overseen by the government. However, most television channels are funded through advertising revenue. There is also effectively no regulation of standards on Internet media, although the House of Commons committee on fake news called for the same regulation as on TV to be applied after Facebook data theft and psychologically targeted political ads were used by 'Vote Leave' in the 2016 Brexit poll.

Second, censorship and obscenity laws have been a highly traditional limit on freedom of expression. The Theatres Act 1968 prohibits obscenity in plays, that is 'indecent, offensive, disgusting or injurious to morality' but with a defence in the public good, while the Video Recordings Act 1984 section 9 makes it illegal to supply of a video without a classification certificate, which is graded according to sexual or violent activity. Obscene publications, since early common law, have been banned although the idea of what is 'obscene' has changed from Victorian values. The Obscene Publications Act 1959 defines 'obscene' as having the effect to 'deprave and corrupt' people, and allows police or the Director of Public Prosecutions to search and seize obscene material, subject to a defence for literary, artistic, scientific or other merit. Pornography, but also non-sexual gay literature, was suppressed until the 1990s, There are around 70 cases each year, but today the Criminal Prosecution Service guidelines only recommend charges for 'extreme' cases. The controversial Digital Economy Act 2017, which would have required age verification on the basis of protecting children to access all pornographic websites, by requiring companies take bank card details, has been repeatedly delayed. Third, there are three main public order offences, based on incitement to disaffection, racial hatred, and terrorism. (Note: Old offences of seditious libel and blasphemous libel were removed by the Criminal Justice and Coroners Act 2009 s 73. See previously R v Burns (1886) 16 Cox CC 355, R v Aldred (1909) 22 Cos CC 1, R v Lemon [1979] AC 617, and Gay News Ltd v UK (1982) 5 EHRR 123 (linking Jesus Christ to homosexuality).) Disaffection means attempting to persuade the armed forces, police, or others, to revolt or even withhold services. Racial hatred means 'hatred against a group of persons defined by reference to colour, race, nationality (including citizenship) or ethnic or national origins', and it is an offence to threaten, abuse or insult anyone, including through displays, to stir up racial hatred. The same idea extends to religious hatred, sexual orientation and in practice disability. In international law, it is also explicit, that advocacy of hatred includes 'incitement to discrimination' (as well as hostility or violence). The Terrorism Act 2006 defines incitement to terrorism as 'direct or indirect encouragement or other inducement' for 'commission, preparation or instigation of acts of terrorism', as well as glorifying terrorist acts (that is 'any form of praise or celebration') punishable with 7 years in prison. Fourth, the laws of defamation and breach of confidence are designed to balance people's reputations and rights to privacy. The Defamation Act 2013 states that defamation means a statement that has or would 'cause serious harm to the reputation of the claimant', and if that claimant is a profit-making body this requires 'serious financial loss'. (Note: Trade unions, central and local government appear unable to bring defamation claims: EETPU v Times Newspapers [1980] 1 All ER 1097 (trade unions), Derbyshire CC v Times Newspapers Ltd [1993] AC 534 (local government).) The truth is always a defence for stating something factual, and a defendant may always show their statement 'is substantially true', or that they made a statement of honest opinion, rather than an assertion of fact. Further, if the statement is in the public interest, it will not be unlawful. Connected to this, news outlets should ask someone who is a subject of a story for their side. Internet operators are liable for statements on their websites that are defamatory if the poster is hard to identify, and they fail on a notice by the claimant to remove the statement within 48 hours. There can be no claim for defamation if a defendant has the 'absolute privilege' of making a statement in Parliament or reports, in the course of high state duty, internal documents or a foreign embassy, or reports of courts' proceedings. There is also 'qualified privilege' which gives a defence to defamation, but only if the writer asks the subject for an explanation or contradiction, for any legislative proceedings outside the UK, public enquiries, non-British government documents, and matters of an international organisation. Given the global nature of media, a claim in the UK must ensure that the UK is the 'most appropriate place', there is no long trial by jury, and courts can order removal of claims from many websites if it has spread. Claims for breach of confidence are meant to protect the right to privacy. Examples have included an injunction against a retired security service officer who wrote a book called Spycatcher that revealed official secrets. But the government lost its claim to have an injunction against a newspaper on the effects of thalidomide on new births.

=== Association and assembly ===
The rights to freedom of association and freedom of assembly are central to the functioning of democracy because they are the basis for political organisation and discourse. Political parties, trade unions, social campaign groups, and businesses all associate freely in democratic societies, and take action upon that freedom, including through assemblies, strikes, or protests. Also protected in international law, the European Convention on Human Rights article 11 states: "Everyone has the right to freedom of peaceful assembly and to freedom of association with others" including joining "trade unions for the protection of" one's interests. Like with other rights, freedom of association cannot be restricted without a lawful justification that is further than necessary in a democratic society, to protect security, safety, health or other people's rights. Freedom of association involves three main principles. First, there is a right to suffer no disadvantage for associating with others, for instance, because if an employer penalises workers for joining a trade union. Second, one must be able to associate with others on the terms one wishes so that, for example, a political party or a trade union must be able to admit or expel members based on their political values and actions. Third, there is a right to act upon the goals of the association, for instance by campaigning for election as a political party, or as a trade union collectively bargaining with an employer for better wages or if necessary going on strike. British law generally imposes no restriction on people forming groups for political purposes, with the significant exception of organisations banned under the Terrorism Act 2000, such as the neo-Nazi white hate group National Action or Jihadi fundamentalists in Al Qaeda.

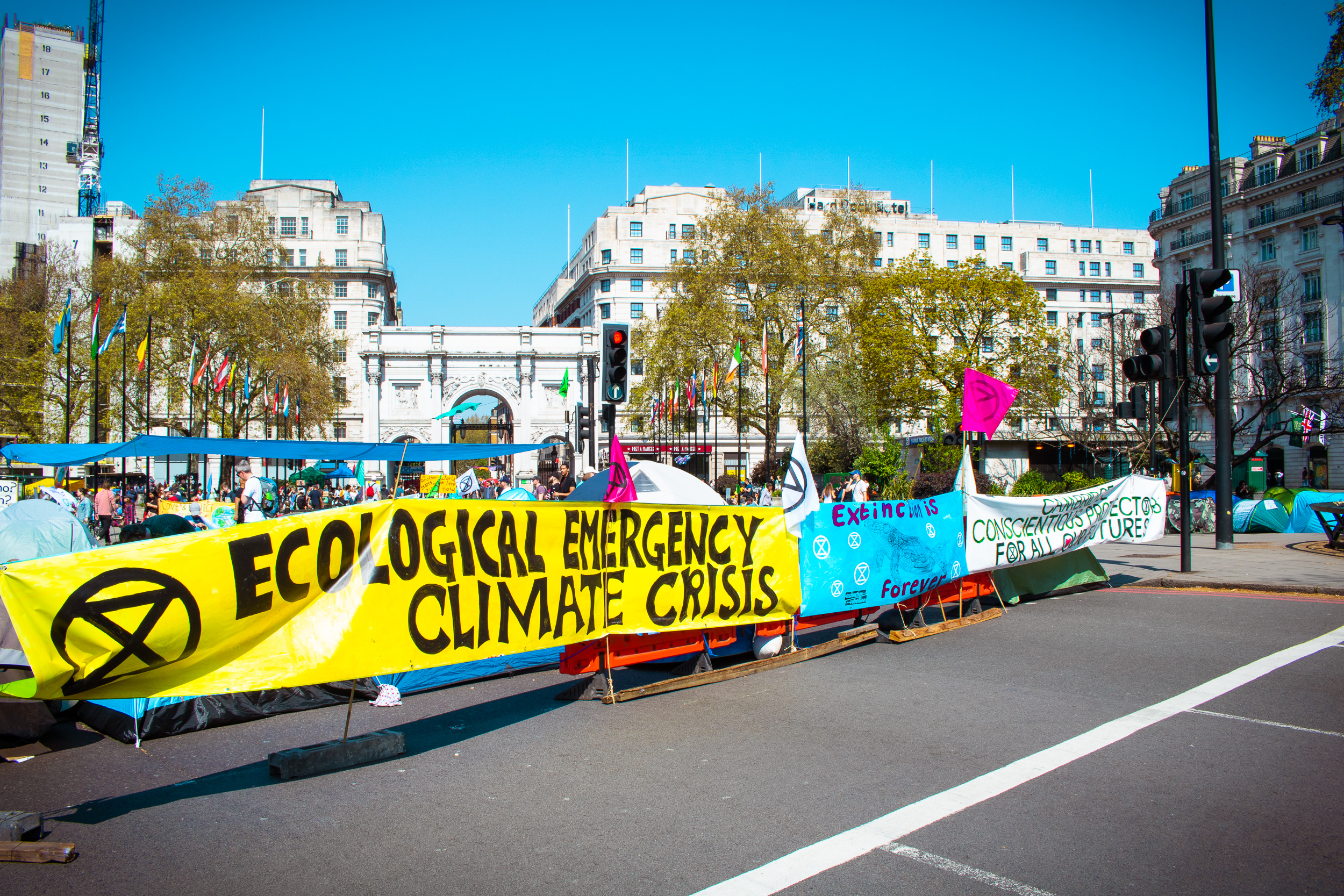
Extinction Rebellion protests in London.

Like freedom of association, the right of peaceful assembly was recognised at common law. For instance, in Beatty v Gillbanks the Salvation Army wanted to march against alcohol. The march was halted by the police over concerns that a rival 'skeleton army' of local brewers would violently disrupt them, and result in a breach of the peace. The court held that nobody could 'say that such an assembly [was] in itself an unlawful one' and said there was 'no authority' for saying anyone 'may be convicted for doing a lawful act'. Any procession in the streets or highways is lawful, although there is a duty to inform police 6 days in advance if it is to demonstrate for a cause. This said, in Kay v Metropolitan Police Commissioner the House of Lords held that a regular cycling protest called Critical Mass required no notification because under the Public Order Act 1986 section 11(2) it was "commonly or customarily held" and it did not have a planned route. Although the Highways Act 1980 section 137 makes it an offence to obstruct a highway, in DPP v Jones the House of Lords held that protestors who assembled on roads around Stonehenge despite police ordering them to disperse from a four-mile radius, could not be lawfully arrested or convicted, because their occupation was 'not inconsistent with the primary right of the public to pass and repass.' As well as rights to use public spaces, the law creates positive rights to use public property, such as school halls, for public political meetings. Universities also have a special duty, imposed in 1986, to 'ensure that freedom of speech within the law is secured for members... and for visiting speakers' and people are not denied use of premises based on their views or objectives. This does not mean, however, that student societies cannot protest or that universities cannot prohibit speakers based on likely threats to property or good order. Anomalously it was held in Hubbard v Pitt that an estate agent might be able to sue a group of protestors in the tort of private nuisance for giving out leaflets and displaying placards opposed to it, on the ground that frustrated its business. Lord Denning MR dissented, and would have held the protestors used the highway reasonably, there was no nuisance at common law, and any picket was lawful if to obtain or communicate information for peaceful persuasion. Whenever a picket is made in the "contemplation or furtherance of a trade dispute" it is lawful, so mushroom workers leafleting customers outside a supermarket to boycott their employers' mushrooms acted lawfully even though it caused the employers economic loss.

The right to assembly does not yet extend to private property. In Appleby v UK the Court of Human Rights held there was no interference in ECHR article 11 when the owners of a private shopping mall in Washington, Tyne and Wear excluded protestors collecting signatures to stop the loss of open space from their mall. Although British law could provide more protection than the minimum European level, it does not, and makes it an offence under the Criminal Law Act 1977 to enter 'any premises' without leave, or threaten violence to secure entry. For 'residential premises' it is also an offence to remain as a trespasser after being required to leave. Further, a law dating from 1875, still makes it an offence to 'wrongfully and without legal authority... watch and beset' premises. In R v Jones, Jones entered a Royal Air Force base intending to damage military equipment during the 2003 invasion of Iraq, which was itself a violation of international law. The House of Lords held that it was no defence even if the invasion was itself unlawful in international law, and there was still a conspiracy to cause criminal damage in violation of the Criminal Law Act 1977 section 1. The Criminal Justice and Public Order Act 1994 also makes it an offence to trespass and reside, disrupt or quat on premises without the owner's consent. Genuine beliefs in the importance of the cause is no defence, and an injunction can be obtained for violations. However, in all of these offences, the human right of freedom of assembly or expression of the protestors must be taken into account. There are also four further significant public order offences. First, it is unlawful to riot, where 12 or more people use or threaten unlawful violence. Second, using threatening, abusive or insulting words or behaviour, including on signs, is an offence if this could make people believe they will suffer immediate unlawful violence, or if it causes or is likely to cause "harassment, alarm or distress." Insults did not include anti-apartheid protests at Wimbledon that spectators resented, and did not include books, such as Salman Rushdie's The Satanic Verses where the immediacy of any result is lacking. Third, harassment is an offence under the Protection from Harassment Act 1997 section 4 if it causes someone to fear on two or more occasions that violence will be used against them. Fourth, while breach of peace is not an offence itself, the apprehension that it is about to happen is grounds for arrest. This has included selling a National Front paper outside a football ground, and a homophobic preacher holding signs in Bournemouth saying 'Stop Immorality', 'Stop Homosexuality' and 'Stop Lesbianism'. Generally the police may arrest people who they honestly and reasonably think will risk a breach of the peace, but in R (Laporte) v Gloucestershire Chief Constable the House of Lords held it was unlawful for police to stop a coach of demonstrators from travelling to RAF Fairford and turn it back to London. There was no evidence that a breach of peace was imminent. By contrast, in Austin v United Kingdom the European Court of Human Rights held there was no breach of article 5, the right to liberty, when protestors were kettled in Oxford Circus without food or drink for 7 hours. They were held not to have been falsely imprisoned and the conduct was justified to stop breach of the peace. Arguments were not, however, made under article 11. This said, the police must use their 'operational discretion' at all times with regard to human rights.

=== Social and economic rights ===
The United Kingdom has historically been at the forefront of guaranteeing social and economic rights through its legislative framework, common law, and public services, although in recent history it has repeatedly fallen below international standards. As a founding member of the United Nations, the UK voted in a unanimous General Assembly for the Universal Declaration of Human Rights 1948, and ratified the codifying treaties, primarily the International Covenant on Economic, Social and Cultural Rights 1966 to enshrine rights to education, health, full employment on fair pay and social security, housing, clean energy, food and water, transport infrastructure, communications, a deliberative media, and personal security. The right to education means "free education" and this includes higher education, accessible solely on the basis of merit. While the UK has universal free schools, it fails to ensure university is free since it abolished grants and introduced among the highest tuition fees in the world after 2011. There is a universal right to "medical service", and in this the UK's National Health Service goes further than most countries in ensuring it is free at the point of use. However, since 2012 there has been a marked decline in standards and stagnating life expectancy. The rights to full employment on fair pay and social security engage the full scope of UK labour law, which has been an outlier for bad standards since 1979. There has been persistent unemployment, or under-employment, and the Bank of England Act 1998 prioritises reducing inflation (even where this means reducing wages) over maximum employment. Fair pay has disappeared with no protection except a minimum wage, although there is a right to 28 days' paid holidays and an enforceable system of equal treatment in the Equality Act 2010. The right of freedom of association in trade unions and the right to take collective action is the most restricted in the western world, or in Europe aside from Russia and Turkey. Social security is minimal, and often fails to guarantee a living wage in the event of unemployment or for pensioners, particularly in the face of housing costs and energy bills. The right to housing is precarious, since there is no meaningful control on unaffordable rents, and many young people have wages too low to afford escalating house prices. The "right to the benefits of scienctific progress", which includes clean energy and transport, is nominally protected through UK programmes to reduce emissions under the Climate Change Act 2008 framework, but bans on coal, gas and oil have been slow to be introduced. Rights to food and water are not well protected - although international standards are open, the UK's water pollution problems in particular violate accepted European norms on clean rivers and beaches. The right to freedom of expression, which includes the "licensing of broadcasting, television or cinema enterprises" as "necessary in a democratic society", is partially protected in the UK. While there is a robust system of licensing by Ofcom and public broadcasters in the BBC and Channel 4, internet media and print media remain largely unregulated, with standards of information that risk undermining the democratic process.

=== Security and intelligence ===
- article 3 (no torture), article 2 (life)
- Counter-Terrorism and Security Act 2015
- Terrorism Prevention and Investigation Measures Act 2011
- Protection of Freedoms Act 2012 s 59
- Prevention of Terrorism Act 2005 s 1
- Anti-terrorism, Crime and Security Act 2001 s 23
- A v Home Secretary [2004] UKHL 56
- A v Home Secretary (No 2) [2005] UKHL 71
- Home Secretary v JJ [2007] UKHL 45
- Home Secretary v AP [2010] UKSC 24
- Gillan v United Kingdom [2009] ECHR 28
- Olmstead v. United States, 277 U.S. 438 (1928) per Brandeis J 'In a government of laws, existence of the government will be imperiled if it fails to observe the law scrupulously. Our government is the potent, the omnipresent teacher. For good or for ill, it teaches the whole people by its example. Crime is contagious. If the government becomes a lawbreaker, it breeds contempt for law; it invites every man to become a law unto himself; it invites anarchy. To declare that in the administration of the criminal law the end justifies the means -- to declare that the government may commit crimes in order to secure the conviction of a private criminal -- would bring terrible retribution.'

== Administrative law ==
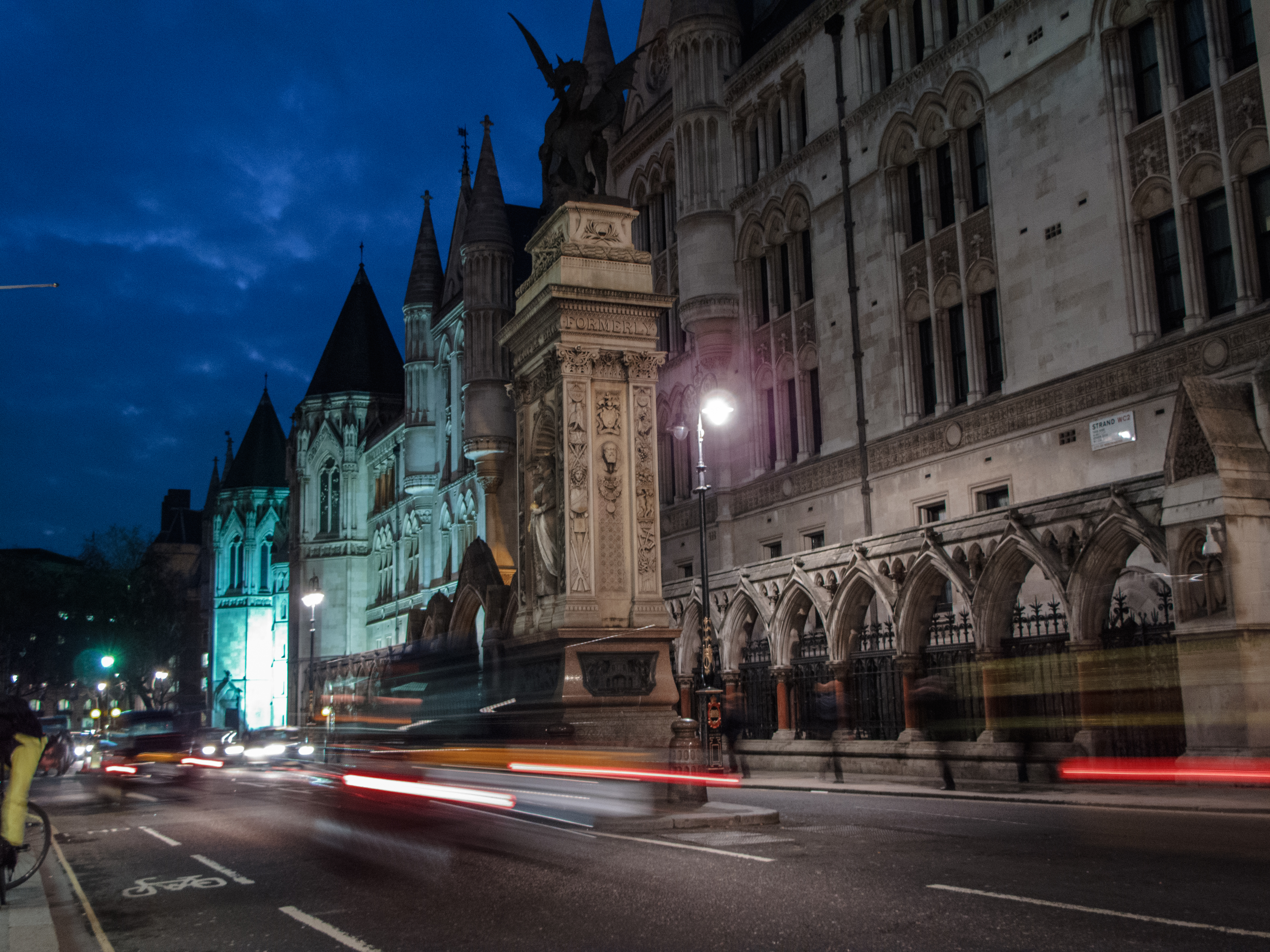
Any person in the UK who is significantly affected by a public body's act can challenge a decision by judicial review. The claims usually begin in the High Court.

Administrative law, through judicial review, is essential to hold executive power and public bodies accountable under the law. In practice, constitutional principles emerge through cases of judicial review, because every public body, whose decisions affect people's lives, is created and bound by law. A person can apply to the High Court to challenge a public body's decision if they have a "sufficient interest", within three months of the grounds of the cause of action becoming known. By contrast, claims against public bodies in tort or contract, where the Limitation Act 1980 usually sets the period as 6 years. Almost any public body, or private bodies exercising public functions, can be the target of judicial review, including a government department, a local council, any Minister, the Prime Minister, or any other body that is created by law. The only public body whose decisions cannot be reviewed is Parliament, when it passes an Act. Otherwise, a claimant can argue that a public body's decision was unlawful in five main types of case:

1. it exceeded the lawful power of the body, used its power for an improper purpose, or acted unreasonably,
2. it violated a legitimate expectation,
3. it failed to exercise relevant and independent judgement,
4. it exhibited bias or a conflict of interest, or failed to give a fair hearing, and
5. it violated a human right.

As a remedy, a claimant can ask for the public body's decisions to be declared void and quashed (via a quashing order), or it could ask for an order to make the body do something (via a mandatory order), or prevent the body from acting unlawfully (via a prohibiting order). A court may also declare the parties' rights and duties, give an injunction, or compensation could also be payable in tort or contract.

=== Substantive judicial review ===
Applications for judicial review are generally divided into claims about the 'substance' of a public body's decision, and claims about the 'procedure' of a decision, although the two overlap, and there is not yet a codified set of grounds as is found in other countries or in other fields of law. First, a claimant may allege that a public body's decision was outside the 'letter and spirit of the law': that an act was ultra vires or did not follow the 'proper purpose' for which the public body's powers were conferred. For example, in R (McCarthy and Stone Ltd) v Richmond Council the House of Lords held that Richmond Council had no statutory power to charge residents a £25 fee to consult its planning officers, because deciding planning permission was a statutory duty, and no charge can be levied by a public body without clear statutory authority. Similarly, in Hazell v Hammersmith and Fulham LBC the House of Lords held that the council acted beyond its powers in the Local Government Act 1972 by entering interest rate swaps transactions, a functional equivalent of borrowing money, which was limited by statute. The courts particularly guard against the executive's attempt to overreach its power. In Ahmed v HM Treasury the Supreme Court held that the United Nations Act 1946 section 1 did not confer on the Prime Minister the right to pass two orders that froze or seized funds of people designed by the UN Security Council as suspected terrorists without any possibility for review. The Act could not have left the definition of what was 'necessary' or 'expedient' to the uncontrolled judgement of the Prime Minister, which affected the rights of citizens without the clear authority of Parliament. A public body may also act unlawfully by misinterpreting its own powers. In Anisminic Ltd v Foreign Compensation Commission the House of Lords held that the Foreign Compensation Commission (a body to compensate British persons who lost property when Gamal Abdel Nasser nationalised the Suez canal during the Suez crisis of 1956) made an error of law by interpreting its powers narrowly. The FCC thought an Order in Council about its powers, which excluded claims by anyone whose 'successor in title' was not a British company, applied to Anisminic Ltd, whose assets were acquired by an Egyptian company after 1956. But the House of Lords held that the Egyptian company was not Anisminic Ltd's 'successor' in title, that the FCC had therefore taken an irrelevant factor into account (its own error of law) in denying a claim, and that the decision had to be a nullity. It was also not possible for an ouster clause in the Act, saying nothing should question the FCC's decisions, to prevent judicial review.

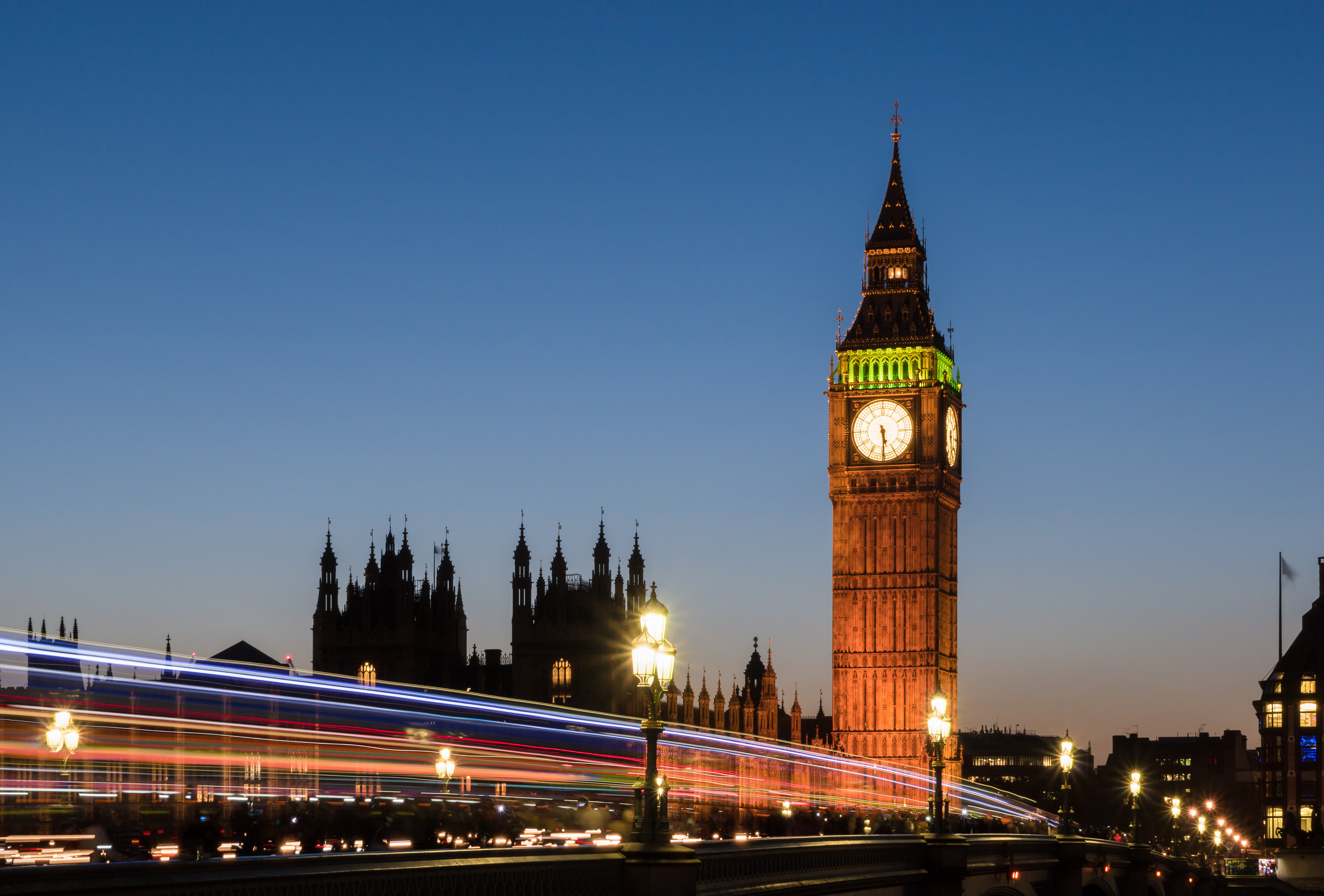

Determining the legality of a public body's action also extends to the purpose and therefore the policy objectives behind the legislation. In Padfield v Minister of Agriculture milk producers successfully argued that the Minister for Agriculture had wrongly exercised his power in the Agricultural Marketing Act 1958 section 19 by not raising subsidies for milk when transport costs changed. The country was divided into eleven milk regions, with different milk prices based on estimates of how much it cost to transport milk. The House of Lords held the Minister was wrong to refuse an investigation into milk price disparities because this frustrated a central policy of the Act: to ensure fair milk subsidies were paid, taking into account costs of production. If public bodies take into account factors outside those necessary for exercising their judgment, a decision will also be quashed. So in R v Home Secretary ex parte Venables and Thompson the House of Lords held that the Home Secretary (Michael Howard) unlawfully took into account the irrelevant consideration of a petition organised by The Sun newspaper to not allow two men release from prison. Instead he should have taken into account the prisoners' progress during detention. In the best known case, Associated Provincial Picture Houses v Wednesbury Corporation, a cinema claimed that the council's requirement that it stop admitting children aged under 15 on Sundays after a local poll was unreasonable. The Court of Appeal (in 1948) held that this was not an unreasonable, irrational or absurd condition and therefore lawful. Lord Greene MR said that the different grounds of judicial review (including an error of law, regarding only relevant considerations, and absurd decisions) all 'run into one another', but that as a general concept a decision would only be unlawful if 'no sensible person could ever dream that it lay within the powers of the authority'. One established ground by which decisions will automatically be unreasonable is if they have a discriminatory impact, violating the principle of equality. In Kruse v Johnson, Lord Russell CJ held that if a public body's actions 'were found to be partial and unequal in their operation as between different classes' it would be unreasonable and ultra vires. However, this test of "Wednesbury unreasonableness" has been repeatedly criticised as having little principled meaning, unless it is coupled with the purpose or policy of the law. The 'proportionality' test has been increasingly favoured, and sometimes said to reach similar outcomes. The proportionality test asks whether a public body's act has a legitimate aim, and then is appropriate, necessary, and reasonably balances individual and social interests, in achieving that aim. This test is routinely used in human rights, discrimination law, and trade law reasoning.

The second major group of cases concern claims that a public body defeated an applicant's 'legitimate expectations'. This is similar to a contract (without the need for consideration) or estoppel, so that if a public body promises or assures somebody something, but does not deliver, they will be able to claim a 'legitimate expectation' was defeated. For example, in R v North and East Devon Health Authority, ex p Coughlan, Miss Coughlan claimed that she should be able to remain in social housing, a care home for people with severe disabilities after the health authority had assured her it was a 'home for life'. Coughlan had become tetraplegic after a severe road accident. The Court of Appeal held that it would be an abuse of power, breaking the assurance was 'equivalent to a breach of contract in private law', and it 'was unfair because it frustrated her legitimate expectation of having a home for life'. By contrast, in Council of Civil Service Unions v Minister for the Civil Service the House of Lords held that the trade union at GCHQ had been given the assurance through the 'existence of a regular practice' that the employer would negotiate over a fair pay scale. However, Margaret Thatcher's decision to stop negotiation through an Order in Council on pay was justified (ostensibly) on grounds of 'national security'. On this point, and while the prerogative was also subject to judicial review, security was 'par excellence a non-justiciable question', their Lordships saying they were 'totally inept to deal with the sort of problems which it involves.' This has been criticised on the basis that the courts should have required reasons as to why workers bargaining for fair pay threatened national security. A third group of cases concern a failure of a public body to exercise independent judgement, for instance by fettering their discretion. In British Oxygen Co Ltd v Minister of Technology the Minister had a rule in handing out capital grants to firms that it would not fund claims under £25. An oxygen cylinder company claimed it should receive the grants it has spent £4m on gas cylinders: they unfortunately just cost £20 each. The House of Lords held that while a government department was entitled to make a rule or policy in exercising its discretion, it must be 'always willing to listen to anyone with something new to say' and to make an exception, a principle akin to equity (mitigating strict legal rules) in administrative law.

=== Procedural review ===
As well as reviewing the substance of a decision, judicial review has developed to ensure that public bodies follow lawful and just procedures in making all decisions. First, like the substance of a decision may go beyond the powers of a public body, a procedure actually followed by a public official may not follow what was required by law. In Ridge v Baldwin a chief constable was summarily dismissed by a Brighton police committee, even though the disciplinary regulations made under the Police Act 1919 required an inquiry into charges against someone before they were dismissed. The House of Lords held the regulations applied, and should have been followed, so the dismissal was ultra vires. But in addition, basic principles of natural justice required the constable should have had a hearing before being dismissed. According to Lord Hodson, the 'irreducible minimum' of natural justice is (1) the right to decision by an unbiased tribunal, (2) notice of any charges, and (3) a right to be heard. The same principles with regard to dismissal have been applied to a wide range of public servants, while the law of unfair dismissal and the common law quickly developed to protect the same right to job security.

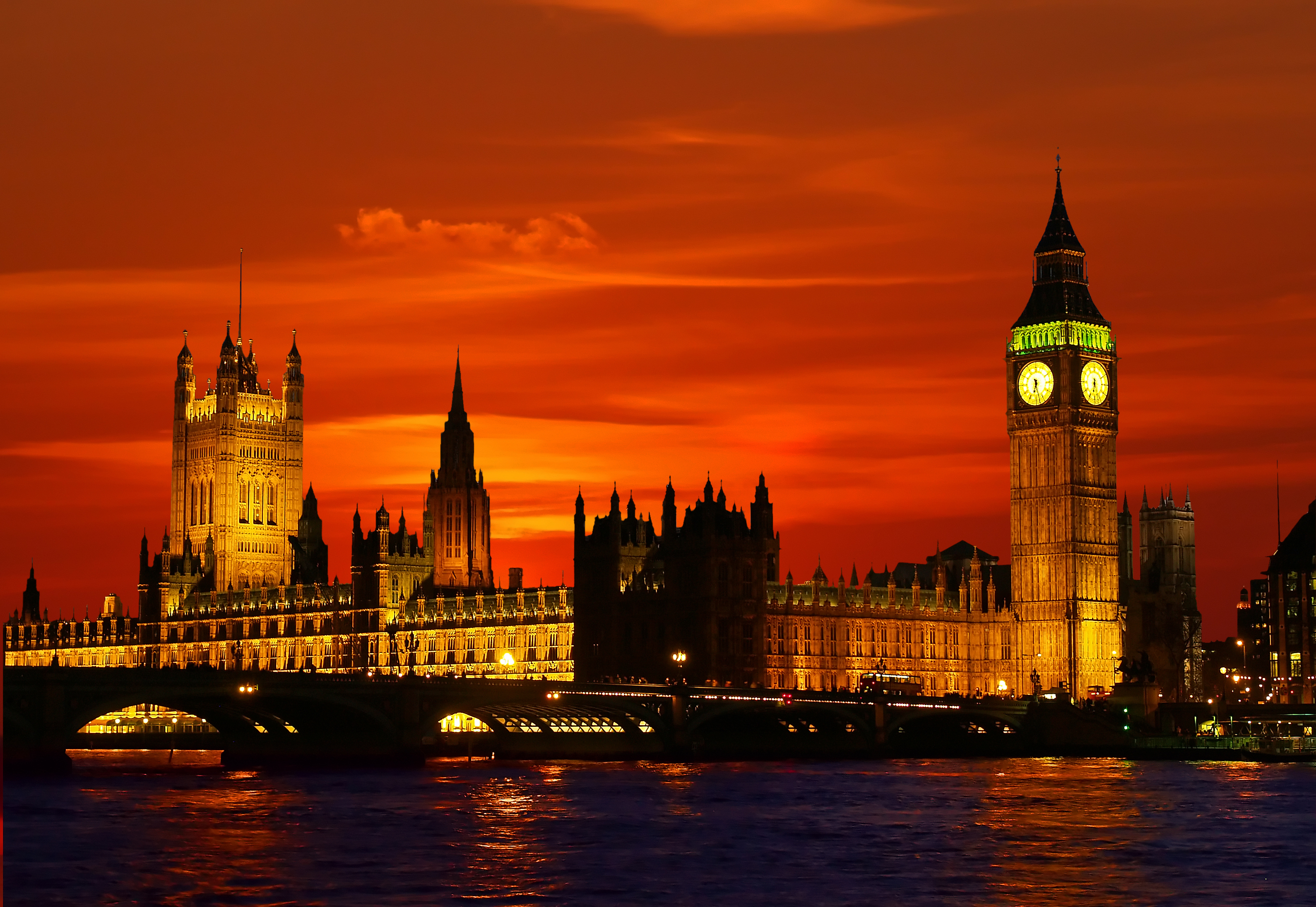

If statutes are silent, the courts readily apply principles of natural justice, to ensure there is no bias and a fair hearing. These common law principles are reinforced by the European Convention on Human Rights article 6, which in determining anyone's 'civil rights and obligations', or 'any criminal charge', requires 'a fair and public hearing within a reasonable time by an independent and impartial tribunal established by law.' The rule against bias includes, for example, not allowing a judge to sit on any case in which he is financially interested, such as being a shareholder in a company that is a litigant. This rule, which reflects a principle of equity that there must be no possibility of a conflict of interest, was applied in R v Bow Street Stipendiary Magistrate, ex p Pinochet (No 2) after the ex-dictator General Pinochet had been ordered by the House of Lords to be extradited to Chile to stand criminal trial. The charity, Amnesty International had argued in the appeal to support extradition, and Lord Hoffmann had not disclosed that he was a director of the charity. The House of Lords, after a complaint, held that its decision could not stand and had to be heard again. According to Lord Nolan, even if there was no actual bias or conflict, 'in any case where the impartiality of a judge is in question the appearance of the matter is just as important as the reality.' Justice 'should not only be done but should manifestly and undoubtedly be seen to be done'. Where conflicts of interest taint any public body's decision, they may be quashed. In Porter v Magill the Conservative majority in Westminster City Council had a policy of selling off council houses in parts of the city where they believed new owners would be more likely to vote conservative. For this reason, the House of Lords held that the councillors had exercised their powers for improper purposes, and were motivated by bias.

The requirements of a fair hearing are that each side knows the case against them, can present their version of the facts, makes submissions on the rules of law, comments on material considered by the judge, and does not communicate with the judge without the other having the same opportunity. For instance, in Cooper v Wandsworth Board of Works, Mr Cooper failed to notify his intention to build a house. The Board of Works decided to demolish the house without giving him any hearing. Byles J held that although 'there are no positive words in a statute requiring that the party shall be heard, yet the justice of the common law shall supply the omission of the legislature.' The right to know any case against you was illustrated in R v Secretary of State for the Home Department, ex p Doody, where prisoners who received life sentences were told a minimum period they had to stay in prison before any review, but not the judiciary's recommendations. The House of Lords held that they had to be able to know the recommended period, and to be able to make representations, before any time was fixed. Often, although there is no hard right to them, a failure to give reasons for a decision will be regarded as unfair, because giving reasons 'is one of the fundamentals of good administration'. In all cases where human rights are at stake, the standards are higher.

=== Human rights review ===
Like the common law grounds (that public bodies must act within lawful power, uphold legitimate expectations, and natural justice), human rights violations are a major ground for judicial review. Since World War II, the Holocaust, and the end of the British Empire, ensuring compatibility between international human rights and British law has generally been considered a binding duty of the courts, but it was only since the Human Rights Act 1998 that the courts have had structured, statutory guidance for how to do this. The Supreme Court has, at least since 2014, adopted a practice of giving indirect effect to international law, to which the UK has acceded through binding treaties. The post-war 'international Magna Carta', the Universal Declaration of Human Rights 1948 was expanded into two human rights Conventions, ratified by the UK, in 1966: the International Covenant on Civil and Political Rights and the International Covenant on Economic, Social and Cultural Rights. Within Europe, the UK was a founding signatory to the European Convention on Human Rights 1950 and the European Social Charter 1961. These documents were not also written into British statute, because it was generally thought that the ordinary mechanisms of judicial review were sufficient. However, to establish a violation of the Convention, claimants had to exhaust the judicial process within the UK before making another application to the Strasbourg court system, and there was no guarantee that British courts would explicitly engage with human rights reasoning in their decisions. The Human Rights Act 1998 was eventually passed to 'bring rights home' in order to make the judicial process quicker, and to ensure greater influence by the British judiciary in formulating what human rights meant.

Under the Human Rights Act 1998 section 3, courts have a duty to interpret legislation so 'far as it is possible to do so' to be compatible with the European Convention on Human Rights. This is a strong duty, and courts must, if a compatible interpretation is possible, use it because the Act presumes Parliament cannot have intended to violate international human rights law. For instance, in Ghaidan v Godin-Mendoza an applicant argued that he should have the right to succeed in title to a flat of his recently deceased homosexual, because the Rent Act 1977 said there was a right of succession if two people lived together 'as his or her wife or husband'. The landlord argued this did not apply, because Godin-Mendoza was gay. This was clearly discriminatory in violation of ECHR article 14, and also an interference in the right to private life and one's home under ECHR article 8. The House of Lords held they could interpret the Act compatibly with the right to equal treatment and one's home, by reading the Rent Act 1977 like it said that they lived together 'as if they were his wife or husband'. If a compatible interpretation is impossible, a court must under section 4 issue a 'declaration of incompatibility', a (rare) notice to Parliament that the law does not match the Convention and should be changed. Parliament has always, since it was written in 1950, ultimately upheld the Convention. Under section 10(2) a Minister may if 'there are compelling reasons' amend legislation to remove the inconsistency, although Parliament often passes a new Act. For instance, in Bellinger v Bellinger a transsexual woman, Elizabeth, married a man called Michael and sought a declaration that this was a lawful marriage under the Matrimonial Causes Act 1973 section 11, which described marriage as being between a 'male' and a 'female'. The judge refused because Elizabeth was classified as male at her birth, and the House of Lords held that, despite being 'profoundly conscious of the humanitarian considerations underlying Mrs Bellinger's claim', they could not interpret the statute compatibly (to give the word 'woman' a non-biological meaning), and so they instead issued a declaration of incompatibility. Parliament soon amended the law in the Gender Recognition Act 2004. Section 6 requires all public bodies to act compatibly with the Convention, and this includes courts in developing common law and equity. Section 8 enables the courts to give any 'relief or remedy' that is 'just and appropriate'. Despite indirect effect, there is not yet direct effect codified in statute for important economic and social rights, such as the right to work, fair pay, increased leisure time, and social security.

A central difference between judicial review based on human rights, and judicial review based on common law ground that a decision is "Wednesbury unreasonable" and ultra vires, is that infringements of rights can only be defended if the infringement is 'proportionate'. If the infringement is disproportionate, the right is violated. The proportionality test requires the court to ask, first, if the public body had a legitimate aim. For most rights, the legitimate aims are set out in sub-article 2, such as infringements for the purpose of national security, health, morals, or the rights of others. Second, the court asks whether the public body's conduct was 'appropriate' or 'suitable' to achieve the aim. Third, it asks if the public body's conduct was 'necessary', and particularly whether it could have taken an alternative course of action that would not have interfered with the applicant's human rights. For instance, in R (Daly) v Secretary of State for the Home Department the House of Lords held that searches of a prisoner's cells which contained legally privileged correspondence with the prisoner's solicitor went further than necessary to achieve the aim of maintaining security and preventing crime, because it was a blanket policy that could be tailored to individual prisoners' circumstances, depending on whether they had been disruptive, a result the same as the common law. Fourth, the court asks whether the action was 'reasonable' in striking a balance between the interests of the individual and society. If anything is lacking, if there is no legitimate aim, or the public body's actions are not appropriate, necessary, and reasonable, its actions will be disproportionate and violate the applicant's right.

=== Standing and remedies ===
Judicial review applications are more limited than other forms of legal claims, particularly those in contract, tort, unjust enrichment or criminal law, although these may be available against public bodies as well. Judicial review applications must be brought promptly, by people with a 'sufficient interest' and only against persons exercising public functions. First, unlike the typical limitation period of six years in contract or tort, the Civil Procedure Rules, rule 54.5 requires that judicial review applications must be made within 'three months after the grounds to make the claim first arose'. Often, however, the same set of facts could be seen as giving rise to concurrent claims for judicial review. In O'Reilly v Mackman prisoners claimed that a prison breached rules of natural justice in deciding they lost the right to remission after a riot. The House of Lords held that, because they had no remedy in 'private law' by itself, and there was merely a 'legitimate expectation' that the prison's statutory obligations would be fulfilled, only a claim for judicial review could be brought, and the three month time limit had expired. It was an abuse of process to attempt a claim in tort for breach of statutory duty.

Second, according to the Senior Courts Act 1981 section 31 an applicant must have a 'sufficient interest' to bring a case. In R (National Federation of Self-Employed and Small Businesses Ltd) v Inland Revenue Commissioners a taxpayer group (the NFSE) claimed that the Revenue should collect tax from 6000 casual Fleet Street newspaper workers, after they had decided to end a practice of tax evasion over many years by collecting for a previous two years and not investigate earlier infringements. The House of Lords held the NFSE did not have a sufficient interest in the issue because this would interfere with the Revenue's general management powers. It was also held that a theatre preservation group had no standing to review a minister's decision refusing to designate a site as an historic monument. On the other hand, it has been consistently recognised that public interest groups have standing to challenge decisions of public bodies, such as a respected and expert environmental group over pollution concerns, a development campaign group over excessive spending in an international dam project, and the government equality watchdog, the Equal Opportunities Commission, for whether British legislation complied with EU law on redundancy protection. Occasionally, the government has attempted to exclude judicial review through putting an ouster clause in an Act, providing that a public body's decisions should not be 'called into question'. However, in R (Privacy International) v Investigatory Powers Tribunal the Supreme Court suggested that ouster clauses cannot restrict the right to judicial review without the most express words, because of a strong common law presumption that Parliament intends for public bodies to act lawfully and within their jurisdiction.

A third issue is which bodies are subject to judicial review. This clearly includes any government department, minister, council, or entity set up under a statute to fulfil public functions. However, the division between 'public' and 'private' bodies has become increasingly blurred as more regulatory and public actions have been outsourced to private entities. In R (Datafin plc) v Panel on Take-overs and Mergers the Court of Appeal held that the Takeover Panel, a private association organised by companies and financial institutions in the City of London to enforce standards in takeover bids, was subject to judicial review because it exercised 'immense power de facto by devising, promulgating, amending and interpreting the City Code' with 'sanctions are no less effective because they are applied indirectly and lack a legally enforceable base'. By contrast, the Jockey Club was not thought to exercise sufficient power to be subject to judicial review. Nor was the Aston Cantlow Parochial Church Council, because although a public authority, it was not a 'core' public authority with any significant regulatory function. In a controversial decision, YL v Birmingham CC held that a large private corporation called Southern Cross was not a public authority subject to judicial review, even though it was contracted by the council to run most nursing homes in Birmingham. This decision was immediately reversed by statute, and in R (Weaver) v London and Quadrant Housing Trust the Court of Appeal held that a housing trust, supported by government subsidies, could be subject to judicial review for unjust termination of a tenancy.

Finally, the Supreme Court Act 1981 section 31 sets out the main remedies available through judicial review: a mandatory order (previously called mandamus) to make a public body do something, a prohibiting order (prohibition) to stop a public body doing something, a quashing order (certiorari) to cancel an act, an injunction, or a declaration. The old writ of habeas corpus also remains available, to require that a person be delivered to court and freed. Further, in contract, tort or unjust enrichment claims against public bodies, the courts may order standard remedies of compensation for loss, restitution of gains, or an award of specific performance. In Chief Constable of the North Wales Police v Evans, however, the House of Lords held that although a police officer was unlawfully dismissed in violation of statute, compensatory damages were a more appropriate remedy than a mandatory order for reinstatement given the rarity (at the time) of specific performance in employment contracts. Occasionally the law makes provision for special privileges or immunities of public bodies from the ordinary law, but these are generally construed restrictively.

== See also ==
- Law of the European Union
- English contract law
- English trust law
- English land law
- English tort law
- English criminal law
- United Kingdom enterprise law
- United Kingdom labour law
- United Kingdom company law
- Constitutional reform in the United Kingdom
- Ancient constitution of England
