= Clark v University of Lincolnshire and Humberside =

UK legal case

Clark v University of Lincolnshire
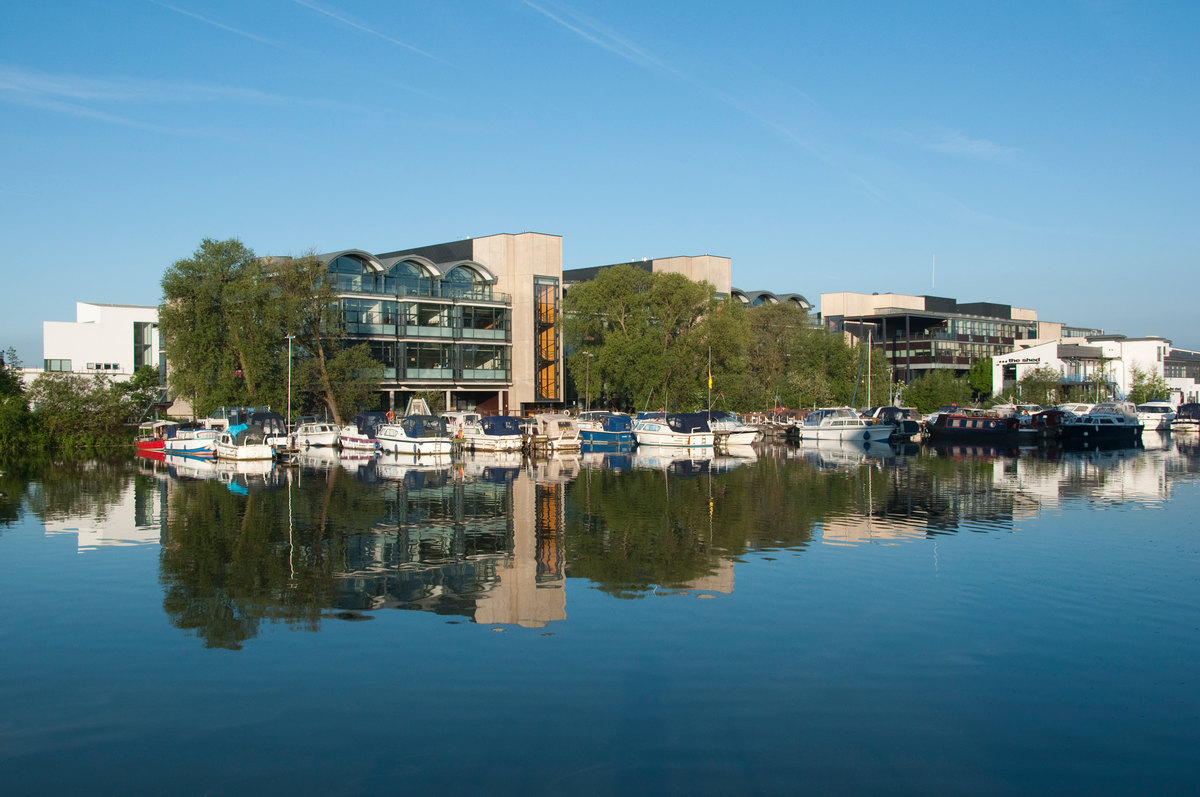
- University of Lincoln
- Court: UK Supreme Court
- Citation: [2000] EWCA Civ 129, [2000] 1 WLR 1988

Keywords
- Enterprise, education, judicial review

Clark v University of Lincolnshire and Humberside [2000] EWCA Civ 129 is a UK judicial review and enterprise law case, concerning the regulation of education.

== Facts ==
Ms Clark claimed that the procedures for reviewing her grades were unlawful, after she got a third class degree from the University of Lincolnshire and Humberside (now called the University of Lincoln), established under the Education Reform Act 1988. Her computer had crashed, and the assignment she wrote on A Streetcar Named Desire in her Humanities undergraduate degree was lost. After she submitted some notes copied from a Methuen commentary, she was failed for plagiarism. On appeal the Academic Appeals Board decided this finding should be abandoned. It was, she was awarded zero, it was appealed again, and the same result. She claimed in contract that it was a breach. The University applied for a strike out action.

== Judgment ==
=== High Court ===
The High Court held that breach of contract claims were not justiciable in the courts. She appealed, and the University argued it was an abuse of process to bring a contract action with a six year limitation period, rather than judicial review with a three month limitation period.

=== Court of Appeal ===
Sedley LJ held that the claim should not be struck out. The relationship of a university to a fee paying student was contractual and courts could adjudicate upon them. Much had changed since O'Reilly v Mackman. However, questions of academic judgment had to be excluded as unsuitable for adjudication by the courts: Hines v Birkbeck College [1986] Ch 524 applied. A claim against a public body for breach of contract should not be struck out simply because judicial review might be more appropriate. The CPR 1998 enabled courts to prevent unfair exploitation of the longer time limits for civil suits. Some aspects of were 'unsuitable' for adjudication 'because these are issues of academic or pastoral judgment which the university is equipped to consider in breadth and depth, but on which any judgment of the courts would be jejune and inappropriate'. But there was a public law dimension for statutory HEIs and judicial review available. This, with a 3 month time limit was preferable to the 6 year limit for contract.

Ward LJ agreed.

Lord Woolf MR agreed and added a set of points on O'Reilly v Mackman [1983] 2 AC 237, Lord Diplock.

A university is a public body... Court proceedings would, therefore, normally be expected to be commenced under Order 53 [for judicial review]. If the university is subject to the supervision of a visitor there is little scope for those proceedings (Page v Hull University Visitor [1993] AC 682). Where a claim is brought against a university by one of its students, if because the university is a "new university" created by statute, it does not have a visitor, the role of the court will frequently amount to performing the reviewing role which would otherwise be performed by the visitor. The court, for reasons which have been explained, will not involve itself with issues that involve making academic judgments.

== See also ==
- UK enterprise law
