= Cheall v APEX =

UK labour law case

- Court: House of Lords

Keywords
- Trade union, governance

Cheall v APEX [1983] 2 AC 180 is a UK labour law case, concerning the governance of trade unions in the United Kingdom.

== Facts ==
Mr Cheall was expelled by Association of Professional, Executive, Clerical and Computer Staff (APEX) after he accepted membership, because he was a member of another union. He knew he was a member of Association of Clerical, Technical and Supervisory Staffs. ACTSS complained to the TUC that APEX acted in breach of the Bridlington Principles. Mr Cheall challenged his expulsion, which followed the union's rules.

In the High Court, Bingham J held that the union rule applied, so Mr Cheall could be expelled. The Court of Appeal overturned the High Court.

== Judgment ==
The House of Lords, Lord Diplock giving the lead judgment, held that the TUC Disputes Committee was entitled to hear the claim before it made its decision. Mr Cheall had no standing to be heard in the hearing between ACTTS and the TUC. He was also not entitled to be heard by APEX ‘where nothing he said could affect the outcome.’ He said the following.

... different considerations might apply if the effect of Cheall’s expulsion from APEX were to have put his job in jeopardy, either because of the existence of a closed shop or for some other reason. But this is not the case.... ... freedom of association can only be mutual; there can be no right of an individual to associate with other individuals who are not willing to associate with him.

== See also ==
- UK labour law
