= Pulau Senang prison riots =

1963 rioting incident in a former prison island of Singapore

Coordinates: 1.173224°N 103.739219°E

- Daniel Dutton, one of the victims killed during the Pulau Senang riots
- Date: 12 July 1963
- Location: Pulau Senang, Singapore
- Outcome: 59 rioters charged with murder in a 64-day jury trial; 18 found guilty of murder and sentenced to death in 1964; 18 found guilty of rioting with deadly weapons and sentenced to three years' jail; 11 found guilty of rioting and sentenced to two years' jail; 12 found not guilty of all charges and acquitted; 18 murder convicts executed by hanging at Changi Prison in 1965
- Deaths: Daniel Stanley Dutton; Arumugam Veerasingham; Tan Kok Hian; Chok Kok Hong
- Injuries: Several others
- Convicted: Tan Kheng Ann and 17 others (murder); 18 people (rioting with dangerous weapons); 11 people (rioting)
- Verdict: Guilty
- Convictions: Murder; Rioting with dangerous weapons Rioting
- Sentence: Death penalty (murder); Three years' imprisonment (rioting with dangerous weapons); Two years' imprisonment (rioting)

The Pulau Senang riots was a case of armed rioting and murder that happened at the Singaporean island of Pulau Senang, where a reformative prison settlement was operated by the government of Singapore to imprison and rehabilitate secret society members, as well as to avoid prison overcrowding at Changi Prison. The settlement first opened in 1960, and had seen bouts of success in reforming many gang members and allowing them to rejoin society.

On 12 July 1963, about 70 to 90 out of the island prison's 300 detainees staged an uprising, resulting in a riot that devastated the whole settlement and killed four prison officers - consisting of Prisons Superintendent Daniel Stanley Dutton, and three of Dutton's assistants Chok Kok Hong (simplified Chinese: 植国雄; traditional Chinese: 植國雄; Jyutping: Zik6 Gwok3 Hung4), Tan Kok Hian (simplified Chinese: 陈国贤; traditional Chinese: 陳國賢; Pe̍h-ōe-jī: Tân Kok-hiân) and Arumugam Veerasingham. Several others, including prison officers and some of the detainees who refused to join the riot, were also injured, but later survived. At the end of the riots, police reinforcements and the Marine Police arrived at Pulau Senang to arrest the rioters, with 71 of them being charged with murder.

In an unprecedented 64-day trial ever conducted in the history of both Malaysia and Singapore, 59 rioters were brought to trial for four charges of murder, with both a special jury of seven and the veteran judge Murray Buttrose set to hear the case. Eventually, eighteen of the defendants, including the ringleader Tan Kheng Ann (alias Robert Black; simplified Chinese: 陈庆安; traditional Chinese: 陳慶安; Pe̍h-ōe-jī: Tân Khèng-an) were sentenced to hang for the murders while another 29 rioters were jailed between two and three years for both rioting and aggravated rioting with deadly weapons, and the remaining twelve defendants were acquitted of all charges.

== Background ==
In 1960, an experimental-type offshore penal colony was established on Pulau Senang by the Singapore government, after the proposal was made by former political prisoner and future president Devan Nair. On the island, the secret society members were allowed to roam freely and were put to manual labour, as part of a rehabilitation programme to allow them to rejoin society. The settlement was established as a countermeasure to resolve the issue of prison overcrowding, as attributed to the large number of suspected gang members being arrested and detained without trial per the government's tough crackdown on secret societies in Singapore.

The prison-settlement was started on 18 May 1960, when about 50 detainees, sent from Changi Prison, arrived with Irish-born Prisons Superintendent Daniel Stanley Dutton, the appointed chief of the penal settlement; another 20 officers and attendants were appointed to the island. Over the next three years, the number of detainees from the mainland rose to 320 and together they transformed the island into an attractive settlement, and there were bouts of success from the results. By September 1962, about 200 offenders had been deemed sufficiently rehabilitated and suitable to return to society.

Dutton was known to be a largely benevolent and lenient leader of the island prison, as he believed that not all humans are born evil and believed that reformation is possible for them through hard work. He also did not allow guards to carry arms as part of the need to build trust between the guards and inmates. However, despite such an outlook, he was also a strict enforcer of discipline and would not tolerate any rule-breaking or defiance of orders from any inmates, and often harshly penalized those detainees who broke the rules. Hence, while he was held in high regard by many detainees and guards, he also earned an unfavourable opinion and dislike from others. Also, the abuse of detainees by some of the prison wardens add to the displeasure the detainees harboured against the authorities who operated the Pulau Senang settlement.

Out of the detainees, Dutton shared the closest bond with Tan Kheng Ann, a high-ranking member of the underworld and one of the few gang members who was English-educated. Tan, also known as Robert Black or Ang Chuar (meaning "Red Snake" in Hokkien and so-named due to his birth in 1941, the year of the Snake), was said to be a charismatic man who mixed well with others and deeply trusted by Dutton. However, when the riots happened on 12 July 1963, Tan was ironically the ringleader who led more than 70 detainees to kill Dutton and cause a revolt.

== Prison riot and killings ==
Tan Kok Hian, who was one of the other three prison officers killed alongside Dutton.

On the afternoon of 12 July 1963, after lunchtime, the guards escorted the 320 detainees to their workplace, where they would carry out their work as usual according to their routine.

It was at this point, about 70 to 90 detainees, armed with parangs and changkols, began to attack the prison guards, as well as the other detainees who refused to join the riot, which lasted for forty minutes and led to a severe destruction of the settlement on Pulau Senang. During the unrest, 39-year-old Daniel Stanley Dutton escaped to the radio room, where he called for help, calling for the assistance of the Marine Police. However, soon after sending the distress signal, Dutton was attacked by the rioters, who poured petrol on him and set him on fire, and he was subsequently slashed and chopped to death by the rioters, who mutilated his body. Three other prison guards - Arumugam Veerasingham, Chok Kok Hong and Tan Kok Hian - were also killed by the rioters in midst of the uprising. Several other people, including Deputy Superintendent John William Tailford, were grievously hurt but they later survived with timely medical intervention. According to Low Ah Kok, a settlement guard, the hospital and petrol station on Pulau Senang was not spared from the damage inflicted by the rioters.

Later, police reinforcements arrived at Pulau Senang, and they all arrested the rioters, who were seen dancing and singing in rejoice at their spoils and destruction of the settlement. Prior to the arrival of the police, one of the rioters Tan Yim Chwee (later known as Accused No. 27; simplified Chinese: 陈殷水; traditional Chinese: 陳殷水; Pe̍h-ōe-jī: Tân In-chúi), whose shirt was stained in Dutton's blood, used it as a flag mast per their celebration of succeeding to kill Dutton. The arrested rioters were all charged with rioting and murder.

== Trial proceedings ==
=== Selection of jury and lawyers of trial ===
On 18 November 1963, after several preliminary hearings, about 59 alleged rioters stood trial at the High Court for the murders of Dutton and three other guards. The number of accused was reduced from 71 to 59 after the preliminary hearings ended with the discharge of 12 defendants from the case.

Till today, the trial was known to be the largest ever conducted in the legal history of both Singapore and Malaysia (since Singapore was still a part of Malaysia at the time of the trial), given that there was a high number of defendants being charged with murder. For easier identification, the 59 accused were to wear number tags: the ringleader Tan Kheng Ann was labelled as Accused No. 1, while his two trusted henchmen Chia Yeow Fatt (alias Botak; simplified Chinese: 谢有发; traditional Chinese: 謝有發; Pha̍k-fa-sṳ: Chhia Yû-fat) and Cheong Wai Sang (alias See Jap Kau Sian; simplified Chinese: 钟伟生; traditional Chinese: 鍾偉生; Jyutping: Zung1 Wai5 Sang1), who were also among the principal perpetrators of the riot, were labelled as Accused No. 2 and 3 respectively. A special courtroom dock was designed to accommodate the 59 defendants.

The trial prosecutor was Francis Seow, who was notable for prosecuting law student Sunny Ang and bar hostess Mimi Wong for murder. The trial judge was Murray Buttrose, who was best known for sentencing the aforementioned killer Sunny Ang to death for killing his girlfriend. A special jury of seven members was selected to hear the case, and back then in Singapore, jury trials were conducted to hear capital cases up until 1970, before the abolition of the jury system.

=== Prosecution's case ===
Major Peter James, a retired British army officer and director of the Singapore Prison Service, testified that he received a phone call from Dutton on the morning of 12 July 1963 before the riots happened, and he stated that Dutton told him there were signs of people who wanted to oppose him, but despite Major James' concern and his pressing demands for a reserve unit to be dispatched to Pulau Senang, Dutton maintained that there was no need for reinforcements, as he was assured that a majority of the detainees would be at his side. However, James went ahead with the dispatch of the reinforcement, but it was too late since the riots had happened. Although the nine defence lawyers of the rioters accused Dutton of torturing and oppressing the detainees into working overtime and became a slave driver who abused his authority, Major James defended Dutton and stated that Dutton was the "kindest of men" he ever knew, and that he was a naturally born leader whom he felt suitable to run the island. Allen Tan Kiat Peng, a detainee who was serving the remainder of his seven-year sentence for robbery on Pulau Senang, stated that the treatment of the detainees were generally "okay" and there was little to no abuse coming from the officers, despite conceding that there was indeed excessive workload on the island.

Tan Kheng Ann, who was Dutton's favourite detainee, was alleged by many witnesses to have led the riot and hacked Dutton to death

Chong Sek Ling, a former gang leader who spent time on Pulau Senang, testified that after an event in July where thirteen carpenters were sent back from Pulau Senang to Changi Prison due to their refusal to repair a jetty during nighttime, he overheard more than ten high-ranking gang leaders discussing about their plan to kill Dutton and the other officers of the settlement, due to their dissatisfaction of the treatment they faced and hatred against Dutton for his supposed iron-fist rule and discipline. Among these people, Chong identified Dutton's closest friend and detainee Tan Kheng Ann, Tan's two henchmen Cheong and Chia, and Hoe Hock Hai (alias Ah Hai; Accused No. 11; Chinese: 侯福海; Pe̍h-ūe-jī: Hôu Hok-hái). Chong stated that he warned Dutton about the upcoming murder plot, but Dutton, whose nickname was "Laughing Tiger", laughed it off and thought that it would not be a big threat on his life even if there was such a conspiracy, although he did ask for the names of the ringleaders. According to Chong, Hoe remarked during their discussion that this unrest would shake the whole of Malaya (present-day Malaysia).

Chong further testified about what he witnessed on the day when the riots happened. One of the things he saw while hiding in the forest was some of the rioters going after Goh Keng Wah (alias See Kar Chua or monitor lizard in Hokkien), a detainee who was an informant of the guards. Goh tried to seek help from Corporal Choo Ah Kim, who was subsequently beaten by the guards despite managing to help Goh escape. During the assault, Corporal Choo was saved by another detainee Quek Hai Cheng, who shielded the blows aimed at the officer, who also confirmed Quek's actions during the preliminary hearing. Liew Woon, another former detainee, also said that he saw two of the defendants – Chan Wah (Accused No. 9; simplified Chinese: 陈华; traditional Chinese: 陳華; Jyutping: Can4 Waa4) and Sim Hoe Seng (Accused No. 25; Chinese: 沈和成; Pe̍h-ōe-jī: Sím Hô-sêng) – climbing the roof of the radio room (where Dutton was using the radio to call for help), chopping through the roof and pouring petrol before starting a fire, causing Dutton, whose body was on fire, to run out of the building, upon which the rioters killed him in a deadly assault. Tan King Hak, an engine diesel instructor of the settlement, also testified that after escaping the radio room, he saw a detainee Lim Tee Kang (Accused No. 5; Chinese: 林志康; Pe̍h-ūe-jī: Lîm Tsì-khang or simplified Chinese: 林志刚; traditional Chinese: 林志剛; Pe̍h-ūe-jī: Lîm Tsì-kang) cutting the wires of the radio with an axe as he and three other rioters Lim Kim Chuan (Accused No. 7; Chinese: 林金泉; Pe̍h-ōe-jī: Lîm Kim-choân), Ponapalam Govindasamy (Accused No. 12) and Ng Cheng Liong (Accused No. 26; Chinese: 黄清良; Pe̍h-ōe-jī: N̂g Chheng-liông) surrounded the burning radio room to prepare their fatal attack on Dutton (who was still inside).

Witnesses also told the court about the deaths of the other three victims. Among them, Allen Tan testified in court that one rioter Chan Wah was responsible for the killing of the officer Tan Kok Hian, who was chopped to death by Chan with a parang. Robert Choo Chiang Eng, a former detainee who later became a prison guard, corroborated that Chan directly killed Tan Kok Hian with the assistance of six other rioters, two of whom he identified as Tan Kheng Ann and Peh Guan Hock (Accused No. 13). As for the attack on Arumugam Veerasingham, Choo identified Lim Tee Kang, Somasundarajoo Vengdasalam (Accused No. 6), Ng Cheng Liong and Ng Chuan Puay (Accused No. 22) as among the seven or eight rioters chasing Veerasingham. Yong Thiam Huat, a clerk from the prison, identified Chew Seng Hoe (Accused No. 15) as the rioter who directly killed Veerasingham.

Lee Mow Cheng (Chinese: 李茂忠; Jyutping: Lei5 Mau6 Zung1; pinyin: Lǐ Màozhōng), a settlement guard who was formerly jailed in 1960 on Pulau Senang before his subsequent release and employment as a guard, stated that while hiding from the rioters under an unserviceable car, he witnessed several detainees, including Quek Hai Cheng, rescuing the heavily injured Tailford and brought him to safety. Lee said that prior to his murder, Dutton refused to arm himself despite telling Lee to arm himself before sending him away to safety.

Many other detainees, as well as the surviving prison settlement attendants and guards - including Wang Loke Hai (alias Cartoon), Chia Teck Whee and Robert Choo - were also called to the stand to give evidence for the prosecution, and they identified those whom they seen taking part in the riots. At one point, when Robert Choo identified Chua Hai Imm (Accused No. 24) as a rioter, Chua angrily shouted at Choo and told him to stop framing him despite the judge's warnings. Deputy Superintendent John Tailford, who survived his injuries, also appeared as a witness but he suffered from retrograde amnesia and had no memory of the riots, hence he could not identify the rioters and can only tell the court that his injuries resulted from "some fighting" on Pulau Senang.

The prosecution's case was presented between November 1963 and February 1964. A month before the prosecution ended their case, one of the 59 defendants Tan Eng How (or Tan Eng Hoe), known as Accused No. 45, was acquitted of all charges and set free since a prosecution witness clearly stated Tan was hiding with him during the onslaught. The release of Tan Eng How left 58 men to remain on trial for murder.

=== Defence's case and summing-up of case ===
In February 1964, the 58 accused rioters were ordered to make their defence. 42 of them elected to remain silent, while the remaining accused either testified on the stand or made unsworn statements on the dock. For those who made their defence, including Somasundram Subramaniam (Accused No. 4), Aziz bin Salim (Accused No. 36), Lim Heng Soon (Accused No. 53) and Chia Tiong Guan (Accused No. 55), their main defences were that they were being wrongfully charged due to mistaken identities, or that they were named by some of the witnesses due to personal grudges with these people, including the guards. The defence sought to argue that the men only revolted due to their dissatisfaction over the living conditions of Pulau Senang and they claimed that the rioters should not be guilty of murder, given that not all of them shared the common intention to spark destruction and make attempts on the lives of Dutton and his assistants.

After the defence and prosecution made their final submissions, the trial judge Murray Buttrose spent five days summing up the case for the jury to consider before reaching their verdict and adjourned the proceedings on 11 March 1964. The trial lasted for a total of 64 days, the longest ever in the history of both Singapore and Malaysia.

== Final verdict ==
On 12 March 1964, after an adjournment overnight to consider the verdict, the seven-men jury returned with the verdict they had decided upon, and presented it to the judge.

Acquittal

Out of the 58 accused, the jury found eleven of the defendants not guilty of all charges and therefore, Justice Buttrose granted these twelve people a discharge amounting to an acquittal.

Rioting

As for the remaining 47 accused, the jury found eleven of these rioters guilty of rioting. Before passing sentence, Justice Buttrose addressed to these eleven men in his own words:

"Here, I feel bound to tell them that they have to consider themselves among the most fortunate people alive, in that evidence apparently failed in the eyes of the jury, to come up to the standard which the law requires before they could be convicted of the charges of murder."

Justice Buttrose stated that nonetheless, the verdict did not dispute the fact that these eleven people were part of an unlawful assembly and had taken part in the armed uprising. He considered the sentence he was about to pass as "inadequate" given the circumstances, but his hands were tied since it "represents the maximum the law allows (Buttrose) to impose", and concluded his remarks by sentencing the eleven defendants to two years' imprisonment, which was the highest punishment under the laws back then for rioting.

Rioting with deadly weapons

After which, the jury stated that they found eighteen out of the remaining 36 defendants guilty of rioting with dangerous weapons. Here once again, Justice Buttrose personally addressed to these eighteen convicts that they should consider themselves, like the eleven guilty of rioting before them, the luckiest people alive and repeated essentially the same remarks he did to the eleven rioters before these eighteen guilty of armed rioting. At this point again, Justice Buttrose stated that the sentence he passed was "inadequate" and yet the maximum he was legally allowed to mete out, before sentencing these eighteen rioters to the maximum of three years' imprisonment for rioting with deadly weapons.

Murder

At the final stage of the verdict, the jury found the last eighteen rioters, including the ringleader Tan Kheng Ann and his henchmen Chia Yeow Fatt and Cheong Wai Sang, guilty of three of the original charges of murder, relating to the killings of Daniel Dutton, Arumugam Veerasingham and Tan Kok Hian. The fourth charge of murder for the killing of Chok Kok Hong was not mentioned among these murder charges since it was stood down during the proceedings.

Justice Buttrose personally addressed the final eighteen in his own words before he passed the sentence:

"I cannot see how the jury could possibly have arrived at any other verdict than guilty. You and each of you have been convicted of the murder of Dutton, Arumugam Veerasingham and Tan Kok Hian. The evidence was established that these murders were committed in circumstances of such utter brutality, ruthlessness and savagery as defies description."

Justice Buttrose went on to further remark that the case had indeed "shaken the whole of Malaya (currently known as Malaysia)" like what Accused No. 11 (real name Hoe Hock Hai; one of the eighteen guilty of murder) allegedly proclaimed based on the testimony of prosecution witness Chong Sek Ling. He stated that the rioters had not only violently murdered the four victims, they also destroyed the whole penal settlement on Pulau Senang within more than half an hour, in an impossibly devastating and ferocious manner and of immeasurable speed. He therefore stated, "The time has now come to pay the penalty for your dreadful acts."

Before Justice Buttrose imposed the death penalty (the mandatory sentence for murder) on the eighteen rioters, every person present in the courtroom (including the defendants, prosecution and defence counsel) were ordered to stand as Justice Buttrose publicly pronounced the verdict of death in his own words:

"The sentence of the Court upon you is that you be taken from this place to a lawful prison and hence to a place of execution, and that you be hanged by the neck until you be dead and may the Lord have mercy on your souls."

When they were all sentenced to death, the eighteen men guilty of murder were reportedly silent, with some red-eyed with tears and some sweating profusely with anxiety as they heard the judge pronouncing the verdict of death upon them.

== Sentences of the rioters ==
The following list contains the names of the rioters and the sentences they received at the end of the Pulau Senang trial.

Acquittal - Not guilty

1. Kwek Kok Wah - Accused No. 28
2. Tay Teck Bok - Accused No. 35
3. Leow Ah Chai - Accused No. 41
4. Lim Kim Sian - Accused No. 42
5. Soh Ah Kang - Accused No. 44
6. Tan Eng How - Accused No. 45 (acquitted halfway throughout the trial)
7. Koh Ah Tiaw - Accused No. 48
8. Tan Tian Lay - Accused No. 50
9. Gan Kim Siong - Accused No. 52
10. Ng Pang Leng - Accused No. 54
11. Chia Tiong Guan - Accused No. 55
12. Low Chai Kiat - Accused No. 59

Rioting - Two years' imprisonment

1. Heng Lian Choon - Accused No. 20
2. Sim Cheng Tee - Accused No. 23
3. Tok Kok Peng - Accused No. 29
4. Ang Teck Kee - Accused No. 34
5. Cheong Kim Seng - Accused No. 39
6. Yong Ah Chew - Accused No. 43
7. Choy Peng Kwong - Accused No. 46
8. Teng Ah Kow - Accused No. 49
9. Lim Heng Soon - Accused No. 53
10. Koh Teck Thow - Accused No. 56
11. Lim Thiam Huat - Accused No. 57

Rioting with deadly weapons - Three years' imprisonment

1. Chin Kiong - Accused No. 10
2. Peh Guan Hock - Accused No. 13
3. Chia Geok Choo - Accused No. 14
4. Yeow Yew Boon - Accused No. 16
5. Teng Eng Tay - Accused No. 17
6. Ong Aik Kwong - Accused No. 18
7. Lim Teck San - Accused No. 21
8. Ng Chuan Puay - Accused No. 22
9. Chua Hai Imm - Accused No. 24
10. Teo Han Teck - Accused No. 30
11. Sia Ah Kow - Accused No. 32
12. Tan Tian Soo - Accused No. 33
13. Aziz bin Salim - Accused No. 36
14. Chew Yam Mang - Accused No. 37
15. Teo Lian Choon - Accused No. 38
16. Tan Chin - Accused No. 40
17. Heng Boon Leng - Accused No. 47
18. Neo Kim Leong - Accused No. 51

Murder - Death penalty

1. Tan Kheng Ann - Accused No. 1
2. Chia Yeow Fatt - Accused No. 2
3. Cheong Wai Sang - Accused No. 3
4. Somasundram s/o Subramaniam - Accused No. 4
5. Lim Tee Kang - Accused No. 5
6. Somasundarajoo s/o Vengdasalam - Accused No. 6
7. Lim Kim Chuan - Accused No. 7
8. Khoo Geok San - Accused No. 8
9. Chan Wah - Accused No. 9
10. Hoe Hock Hai - Accused No. 11
11. Ponapalam s/o Govindasamy - Accused No. 12
12. Chew Seng Hoe - Accused No. 15
13. Chew Thiam Huat - Accused No. 19
14. Sim Hoe Seng - Accused No. 25
15. Ng Cheng Liong - Accused No. 26
16. Tan Yin Chwee - Accused No. 27
17. Sim Teck Beng - Accused No. 31
18. Cheng Poh Kheng - Accused No. 58

== Fates of the eighteen condemned ==
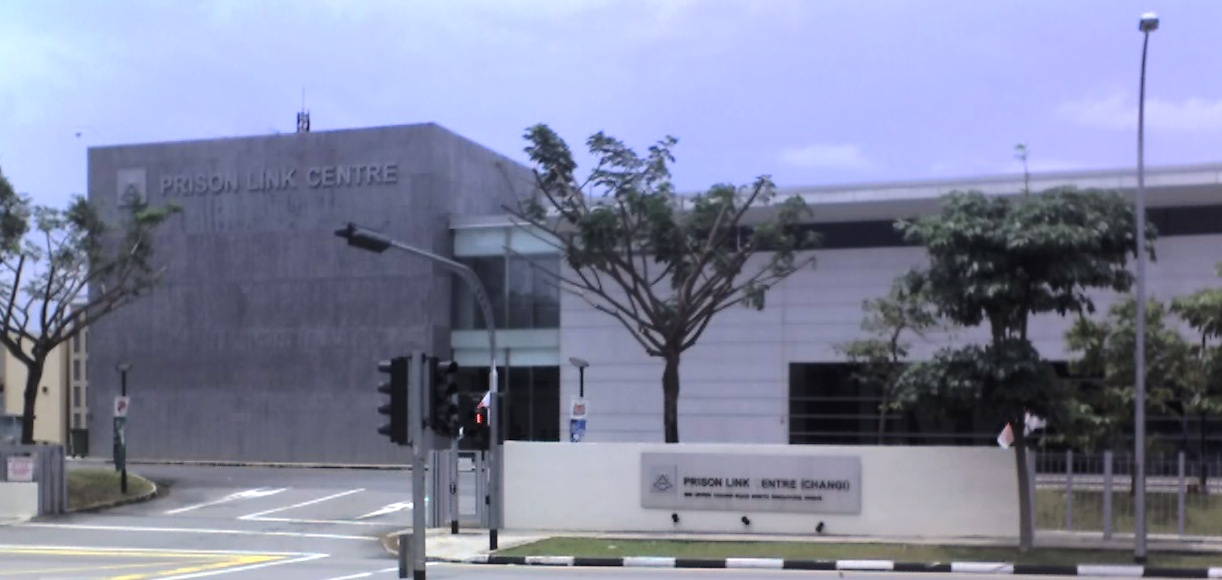
Changi Prison, where the eighteen rioters were incarcerated on death row before their executions at the prison gallows

After the end of the 64-day trial, the eighteen men on death row for murder later appealed to the Federal Court of Malaysia to review their cases, with veteran lawyer and opposition politician and former Chief Minister of Singapore David Saul Marshall representing them in the appeal, but they all lost their appeals in May 1965. They were also denied leave to appeal to the Privy Council of London against their sentences. In a final bid to escape the gallows, all the eighteen condemned submitted a plea for clemency.

By this time, Singapore became a sovereign state after its independence from Malaysia on 9 August 1965, meaning that the men's clemency petitions would be reviewed by Yusof Ishak, the first President of Singapore since its independence. However, President Yusof decided not to pardon the eighteen death row rioters and therefore on 19 October 1965, he dismissed their clemency appeal and finalized their death sentences for murder. Soon after, the death warrant was issued for all eighteen men, scheduling them all to be hanged ten days later on 29 October 1965.

During their time on death row, the eighteen condemned were counselled by Reverend Khoo Seow Wah (or Khoo Siau Hua), who preached to them his Christian beliefs and gradually, the eighteen men reflected on their wrongdoings and they showed both regret and repentance for their acts, as witnessed by Reverend Khoo, although some prison guards who supervised them did not feel that they were genuinely remorseful of their crimes. Before their hangings, Tan Kheng Ann, who was English-educated, penned a letter on behalf of himself and the seventeen others to show their gratitude to Reverend Khoo for his kindness and guidance.

On the Friday morning of 29 October 1965, the eighteen men, including Tan Kheng Ann (then 24 years old) and his two henchmen Cheong Wai Sang and Chia Yeow Fatt, were all hanged at Changi Prison, with the prison's veteran executioner Darshan Singh being solely in charge of their executions. The eighteen men were executed in batches of three by a ten-minute time interval, and all of them sang as they made their final steps to the gallows. Hundreds of relatives of the eighteen men, who all made their final visits on the eve of the executions, gathered outside the prison compound to reclaim the bodies.

A brother of Chew Thiam Huat (alias Baby Chye; Accused No. 19; Chinese: 周添发; Pe̍h-ōe-jī: Chiu Thiam-hoat; pinyin: Zhōu Tiānfā), who was one of the eighteen rioters hanged for the most serious charges of murder, told the press that his brother, a former star soccer player who once represented Singapore and had a bright future ahead, had paid the ultimate price for killing the four prison officers, and he expressed his sadness over Chew's execution. Lim Ah Mei, the 64-year-old mother of Hoe Hock Hai, who was also among the eighteen condemned, sadly stated that her son was only 24 when he was put to death.

According to a Sin Chew Jit Poh article published on 30 October 1965, the mother of one of the executed men was reportedly so distraught that she nearly collapsed at the sight of her son's body and had to be helped up by relatives. Out of the eighteen condemned, only one was married with two children, and all of the men were in their twenties and the oldest of them was at most thirty years old.

== Aftermath ==
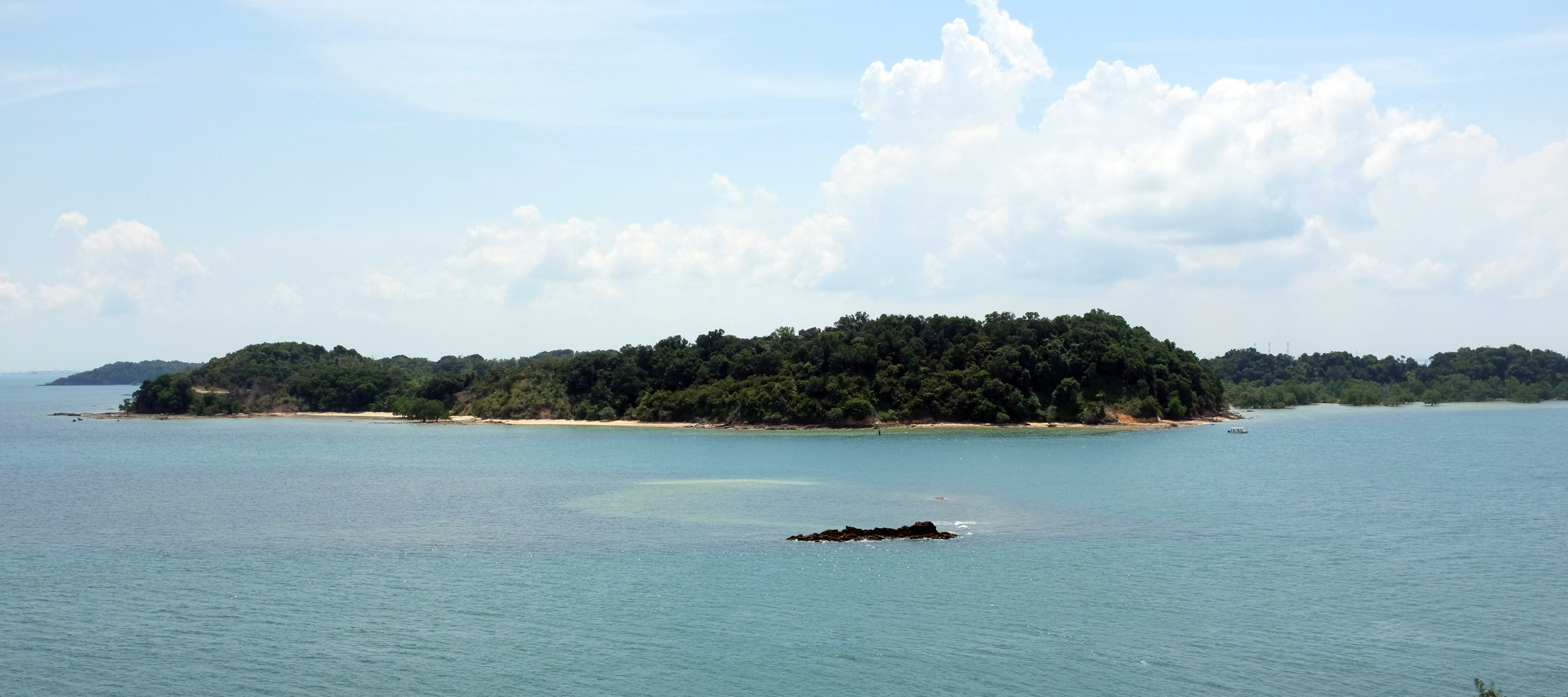
Pulau Senang, the island where the riots occurred.

Five years after the riots occurred, Pulau Senang was declared out of bounds in 1968, and the government's subsequent plans to renovate the island for economic means failed to materialize. In 1984, the island was converted to a live-firing range, where it was provided exclusively to the Singapore Armed Forces (SAF) for military training and restricted to outsiders.

In the aftermath of the riots, one of the survivors John Tailford, who was grievously injured in the riots, died of cancer in March 1988, at the age of 64. Murray Buttrose, the trial judge of the case, retired in 1968 and returned to Australia, where he lived until his death at the age of 84 in September 1987, and the Pulau Senang trial was cited as one of the iconic cases ever presided by Justice Buttrose, who was the last colonial judge to serve in independent Singapore.

Francis Seow, the trial prosecutor of the case, later switched to private practice in 1972, became a dissident and joined politics as a member of the opposition politics, but he later left Singapore in 1988 before his trial for tax evasion, which resulted in his conviction in absentia. Seow lived in political exile at the United States for the next 28 years before he died at the age of 88 in January 2016. In a Straits Times article which reported Seow's death and his former cases as a prosecutor, a retired civil servant recalled in an interview about Seow's determination to seek the death penalty for at least a dozen of the Pulau Senang rioters, as he firmly believed that a very clear signal should be given to all prisoners that anyone found guilty of the intentional killing of a prison officer would face the full brunt of the law, which he fulfilled in the end by successfully having eighteen of the 58 rioters sentenced to the gallows.

The Pulau Senang trial was known to be the case where the highest number of death sentences was imposed in a single trial, with eighteen people being sentenced to hang for murder. This highest record remained unsurpassed, even though the year 1976 was reported as the year where it had sixteen people sentenced to death, the highest record garnered in a decade.

== In popular media ==
The rioting incident at Pulau Senang was remembered as one of the bloodiest moments of Singapore's history before its independence. Singapore-based British journalist Alex Josey wrote a book about the case, titled Pulau Senang: The experiment that failed, and it was first published in 1980.

On 25 October 2004, 41 years after the rioting of Pulau Senang, Singaporean crime show True Files re-adapted the Pulau Senang incident and aired the re-enactment as the first episode of the show's third season. During an interview by the show producers, one of the former detainees Teng Ah Kow (labelled as Accused No. 49), who was one of the eleven jailed for rioting, spoke about his experience at Pulau Senang, stated that in contrast to the harsh, poor living conditions of Changi Prison, he preferred his more carefree prison life at Pulau Senang, as the living conditions was more relaxing and he freely get to have walks at night. When asked why the detainees revolted against Dutton and his allies, Teng stated he did not know exactly why the riots happened despite having taken part in the unrest, but he conceded that there are some detainees whom he knew had a grudge against Dutton. Two of the rioters' lawyers P. Suppiah and G. Abisheganaden were also interviewed in the episode, in which the latter stated that the main reasons behind the failure of Pulau Senang's experimental prison were due to the fact that the wrong people were picked to run the island prison and that the hardcore secret society members, instead of the other criminals, were being sent to the island.

In May 2014, a theatre adaptation of the Pulau Senang case, scripted by playwright Jean Tay, came to fruition. Kok Heng Leun directed the play, with an all-male ensemble cast, which included Oliver Chong, Chad O'Brien, Ong Kian Sin, Tay Kong Hui, Peter Sau, Rei Poh and Neo Hai Bin.

In 2022, 59 years after the riots at Pulau Senang, CNA produced a two-part documentary, which covered the Pulau Senang tragedy. Dutton's younger half-brother Michael and granddaughter Ferlynna were both interviewed in the documentary. Both expressed their pride in Dutton for having proven his beliefs of rehabilitating criminals through hard work, but also their sadness for his unfortunate death. Ferlynna also stated that the eighteen men hanged for her grandfather's murder "deserved" what they had gotten. This also marked the first time Michael Dutton get to come to Singapore to visit his elder half-brother's grave, seventy years after he last met his late brother. Michael stated that to a certain extent, he felt sorry for the eighteen condemned who killed his brother but eventually paid for it with their lives, although he agreed that they should be punished for the crime.

The rioters' ringleader Tan Kheng Ann's younger brother Richard Tan (the eighth out of eighteen children) also agreed to be interviewed about his brother's crime. Filled with sadness over the case, Richard stated that he was unable to believe how his fifth eldest brother, who had a few months left before his release date, would take part in the riot and commit such a brutal act and said that prior to his execution, Tan Kheng Ann, who at first denied murdering Dutton, eventually resigned to his fate and asked Richard to take care of their mother.

Similarly, former detainee Tan Sar Bee, who was not part of the rioters, claimed in the documentary interview that even though he witnessed the riots and destruction while in the island's hospital, he was in disbelief over how Tan Kheng Ann, whom he knew as a "mischievous and playful" young man who liked sports, would be capable of such utter violence and much less, the leader of the rioters as described by witnesses who saw Tan killing Dutton. Tan Sar Bee, who eventually died in January 2023, also spoke about how he did witness some detainees, as well as himself, suffer abuse from some of the officers during his three-month stay at Pulau Senang, and described one of the guards Chia Teck Whee (alias Ah Chia), as an infamously cruel devil beneath his kind-hearted appearance. Tan Sar Bee stated that when he heard from an elderly canteen worker at the hospital about the death sentence verdict, he did not take the news well and felt saddened as some of his friends were among the eighteen rioters who received the death penalty.

Also, law professors, lawyers, police officers and humanities experts, including some from the National University of Singapore, were approached to give an analysis of the case, stating that the Pulau Senang incident would have been averted had the shortcomings like the abuse from prison guards and overworking had been addressed adequately.

== See also ==
- Capital punishment in Singapore
