= Margaret Drive hawker murders =

1976 double murders of a mother and son at a hawker centre in Singapore

Phoon Ah Leong
- Phoon Ah Leong, who was stabbed to death
- Born: Phoon Ah Leong; 1952; Colony of Singapore
- Died: 12 December 1976 (aged 24); Queenstown, Singapore
- Cause of death: Stabbed
- Occupation: Hawker
- Parents: Phoon See (father); Hu Yuen Keng (mother)

Hu Yuen Keng
- Hu Yuen Keng, who was killed together with her son
- Born: Hu Yuen Keng; 1920; Singapore, Straits Settlements
- Died: 12 December 1976 (aged 56); Queenstown, Singapore
- Cause of death: Stabbed
- Occupation: Hawker
- Spouse: Phoon See
- Children: Phoon Hon Sun (son); Phoon Kai Kiew (daughter); Phoon Ah Leong (son); Phoon Hon Pun (son)

On 12 December 1976, at Margaret Drive Hawker Centre in Queenstown, 24-year-old Phoon Ah Leong (潘汉良 Pān Hànliáng) (Note: His name is 潘亚良 Pān Yàliáng in Chinese) and his 56-year-old mother Hu Yuen Keng (Note: Her name was sometimes spelt Hu Yue Kheng, Ho Yuen Kheng, Hue Yuen Keng, and Hu Yuen Kheng.) (许润琼 Xǚ Rùnqióng) were both murdered by another hawker operating at the same hawker centre, 35-year-old Haw Tua Tau (Note: His name was also spelt as Haw Tua Tow) (侯大头 Hóu Dàtóu), who used a hand scraper to stab the mother–son pair to their deaths. The murders were committed as a result of Haw being angered that the tables were not being cleaned properly and the prior quarrels Haw had with the victims over the cleaning of tables.

Haw was charged with the double murder and sentenced to death in March 1978. Haw was hanged in 1982 for the hawker killings, but his final appeal to the Privy Council in London became a landmark case in Singapore's legal history with regard to the prosecution's need to fulfil the burden of proof and presenting a prima facie case against a defendant in Singapore.

== Murders of Phoon Ah Leong and Hu Yuen Keng ==
On 12 December 1976, at Margaret Drive Hawker Centre in Queenstown, two hawkers working at the centre were brutally stabbed to death by another hawker over an alleged dispute, and the brutal stabbing ended with the murderer fleeing the scene. The two victims were 24-year-old Phoon Ah Leong and his 56-year-old mother Hu Yuen Keng, who were both operating a stall selling roast duck and noodles at the centre itself.

According to Professor Chao Tzee Cheng, the senior forensic pathologist who performed an autopsy on both the victims, he determined that Phoon was stabbed once in the heart, and the stab wound was the cause of Phoon's death. He similarly determined that Hu died as a result of two stab wounds that penetrated the heart.

At the time when the mother-son pair died, Hu was married to her husband Phoon See (潘诗 Pān Shī), (Note: His name was also spelt as 潘四 Pān Sì in Chinese) and Phoon Ah Leong was the second son and third child of both Hu and her husband; he had two brothers Phoon Hon Sun (潘汉生 Pān Hànshēng; (Note: His name was also spelt as 潘汉珊 Pān Hànshān in Chinese) Phoon's elder brother) and Phoon Hon Pun (潘汉彬 Pān Hànbīn; Phoon's younger brother) (Note: His name was also spelt as 潘汉宾 Pān Hànbīn in Chinese) and one sister Phoon Kai Kiew (潘佳巧 Pān Jiāqiăo), (Note: Her name was also spelt as 潘闰娇 Pān Rùnjiāo in Chinese) who were among the witnesses (including the stall assistant and customers) of the double murder.

== Criminal charges ==
Inspector Leong Kong Hong became in charge of the police investigations, and they managed to identify the suspect, who was arrested at Singapore General Hospital where he sought treatment for an arm injury he sustained from the earlier stabbing.

The killer was a 35-year-old hawker named Haw Tua Tau, who operated a neighbouring stall selling roast-pork, satay and oyster omelette. At the time of the offence, Haw was married with three daughters at the time of the double murders.

During the same month of his arrest, Haw Tua Tau was charged with two counts of murder in relation to the double deaths at Margaret Drive. In March 1977, the district court's magistrate accepted the prosecutor S Radakrishnan's contention that a prima facie case had been made out against Haw for the double murder, and he ordered Haw's case to be transferred to the High Court for trial hearing on a later date.

== Trial of Haw Tua Tau ==
=== Trial hearing ===
Haw Tua Tau
- Haw Tua Tau, the roast pork seller charged with murder
- Born: Haw Tua Tau c. 1941; Singapore, Straits Settlements
- Died: c. 1982 (aged 41 or 42); Changi Prison, Singapore
- Cause of death: Execution by hanging
- Occupation: Hawker
- Spouse: Chan Lee Kheng
- Children: Haw Swee Gek (daughter); Haw Swee Heok (daughter); Haw Swee Noi (daughter)
- Status: Executed
- Motive: Anger due to improper cleaning of hawker tables
- Conviction: Murder (2 counts)
- Criminal charges: 1st charge: Murder of Phoon Ah Leong; 2nd charge: Murder of Hu Yuen Keng
- Penalty: Death by hanging (x2; mandatory)

On 6 March 1978, Haw stood trial at the High Court for murdering Phoon and Hu. Haw was represented by J S Khosa, while the prosecution was led by E C Foenander. The trial was presided by two judges - Arumugam Ponnu Rajah (also known as A P Rajah) and Frederick Arthur Chua (蔡福海 Cài Fúhǎi; better known as F A Chua).

During the trial itself, the trial court was told that before the day of the murders, Haw had been involved in arguments with both Phoon and his mother for not cleaning the tables properly, and the relationship between Haw and the Phoon family had not been cordial as a result of these misunderstandings and petty arguments. On the day of the murders itself, Haw was angered to see that Phoon dropped some duck bones on the ground while wiping one of the tables, and feeling incensed over this and another matter of Haw overhearing Phoon grumbling about Haw's daughter not cleaning a table well, Haw thus grabbed a hand scraper to stab Phoon on the chest once while Phoon was taking orders from two female customers. Hu, who rushed over to help her second son, had a scuffle with Haw, who stabbed her twice in the chest.

This brutal attack caused both Hu and Phoon to die from the stabbing. Phoon's elder sister Kai Kiew, who witnessed the stabbing of her second brother and mother, tried to intervene, but Haw tried to attack and attempted to stab her, which was averted by Phoon's older brother Hon Sun, who rushed over and slashed Haw on the arm with a chopper, leading to Haw fleeing on a taxi to Singapore General Hospital, where he was arrested while warded for treatment. One of the witnesses, Soh Poh Choo (苏宝珠 Sū Bǎozhū), who was the helper of Haw's hawker stall, said she tried to intervene but was hurt by Phoon's brother. A patron named Wong Moi Chin (黄梅珠 Huáng Méizhū), who was present with her friend Heng Siew Khim (王秀金 Wáng Xiùjīn), verified that Haw had directly approached Phoon and attacked him while Phoon was taking down both their orders, and a third patron Chan Seng Chong (陈盛昌 Chén Shèngchāng) (Note: His name was also spelt as 陈成昌 Chén Chéngchāng in Chinese) witnessed Haw wielding a hand scraper at the time he murdered Hu and Phoon.

In his defence, Haw maintained that he never intended to kill both Phoon and Hu. He testified that he was approaching Phoon with the intention of telling him to clean the table properly and sweep up the duck bones that dropped onto the floor. Haw said during the conversation, he was hit on the head and noticed Phoon was holding a chopper, and Hu was rushing behind her son with a chopper in her hand while heading in the direction of Haw. Haw said that he pushed the mother-son duo in self-defence during the fight, and he never noticed he had an object resembling a piece of wood on his head until he pushed the two victims down, and as a result, it caused the fatal injuries on both Phoon and Hu. Overall, Haw's defence was he had accidentally stabbed the victims to death, and that he was not aware that he had a weapon in his hand when he confronted Phoon over the table cleaning issue. He also stated he never said he stabbed the victims in his statement, and claimed it was an error and he meant to say he had pushed the victims during the incident.

In rebuttal, the prosecution sought a verdict of murder in Haw's case, and they also urged the court to reject Haw's testimony of accidental stabbing and lack of awareness of being armed. They stated that Haw was not telling the truth, and he had intentionally used the scraper to stab both Phoon and Hu over a trivial matter of not cleaning the table properly, such that the injuries caused were sufficient in the ordinary course of nature to cause death, and they also stated that Haw was clearly aware he was carrying a weapon when he confronted Phoon and later stabbed Phoon and his mother. Aside from this, several prosecution witnesses, including Phoon's stall assistant Leong Ah Kum (梁亚金 Liáng Yàjīn), customers and the Phoon family members, also verified earlier during the trial that they never saw the mother-son pair attacking Haw with choppers, which further raised doubts over the credibility of Haw's defence in court.

=== Death penalty ===
On 17 March 1978, after a trial lasting ten days, the two trial judges - Justice A P Rajah and Justice F A Chua - delivered their verdict.

In their judgement, the two judges found that Haw's defence of accidental stabbing and not knowing he was armed was untenable. The two judges agreed that both Phoon and Hu never attacked Haw, and it was Haw himself who confronted the mother-son pair and used the hand scraper to violent attack the two victims, and the story of the victims conducting a chopper attack on Haw was therefore not true. They agreed that Haw knew he was armed and he had intentionally used the scraper to inflict the bodily injuries, such that they were fatal and led to the deaths of Phoon Ah Leong and Hu Yuen Keng, and he also had the intent to cause their death when he committed the stabbing, which also proven he did not done so accidentally. The two judges therefore concluded that on these above grounds, it was sufficient to return with a guilty verdict of murder in Haw's case.

As such, 37-year-old Haw Tua Tau was found guilty of murder on two counts, and he was sentenced to death by hanging for each count of murder. Prior to 2013, Singaporean law prescribed the death penalty as the mandatory sentence for all four degrees of murder under the Penal Code. Haw's wife Chan Lee Kheng (陈丽卿 Chén Lìqìng), who was present in court, reportedly wept as the death sentence was pronounced on her husband. Haw was the first person to be sentenced to death in Singapore during the year of 1978 itself.

== Court of Appeal ruling ==
During the period of Haw Tua Tau's incarceration on death row, the Court of Appeal, which was the highest court of Singapore, reserved judgement in the appeal of Haw against his conviction and sentence on 23 April 1979. Apart from re-using Haw's original two-tier defence of accidental stabbing and not knowing he was armed, Haw's new lawyer M P H Rubin argued that Haw should have been provided a chance to give an unsworn statement from the dock instead of being told to give evidence under oath. This option of giving unsworn statements from the dock was abolished in January 1977, a month after Haw was charged with murder.

On 7 September 1979, the Court of Appeal's three-judge panel, consisting of T Kulasekaram, D C D'Cotta, and Chief Justice Wee Chong Jin, rejected Haw's defence and in turn, they rejected his appeal, after they agreed that the trial court had not erred in convicting Haw of killing Hu and Phoon after duly considering the evidence presented in Haw's trial.

== Privy Council appeal ==
After his appeal was rejected, Haw Tua Tau went on to file a motion for special leave to appeal to the Privy Council in London to review his case. Subsequently, on 18 December 1980, Haw's motion was granted by the Privy Council, and an eminent Queen's Counsel, Louis Blom-Cooper, was assigned to defend Haw in his appeal. Haw's lawyer argued that Haw's murder conviction should not be affirmed on the grounds that it was unconstitutional for the trial court to prohibit Haw from making an unsworn statement on the dock when his defence was called, and that his defence should not be called when the prosecution had not proven his case beyond a reasonable doubt prior to the court ruling Haw had a case to answer.

On 22 June 1981, the Privy Council meted out their judgement for Haw's appeal. In their verdict, the Privy Council's judges, led by Lord Diplock, ruled that the prosecution should be allowed to proceed with their case against a defendant in court, as long as they were able to present sufficient evidence to substantiate a prima facie case to prosecute a defendant for any offence charged. Diplock, who delivered the verdict on behalf of the panel, stated it was not necessary for the prosecution to meet the criteria of proving a case beyond a reasonable doubt before calling for an accused to put up a defence in court. The judges also rejected Haw's argument of breach of constitutionality by not letting him opt to give unsworn statements, because this option was not available under the law, and they felt it would be invidious to allow an accused to give a story while not under oath and untested under cross-examination. The judges also touched on the right for judges to draw adverse inferences from a person's choice to not give his defence, and stated that judges were entitled to do so if the prosecution's case was left unrebutted and the accused did not answer to the charge, which may warrant a conviction of the accused. Overall, the Privy Council found that Haw's conviction for murdering Phoon and Hu should stand, and there was no basis to set aside his two death sentences and double murder conviction due to them agreeing with the courts of Singapore that Haw was rightfully convicted of the hawker murders back in 1976. Hence, Haw's appeal was dismissed by the Privy Council, leading to Haw failing in his final bid to escape the gallows.

== Execution ==
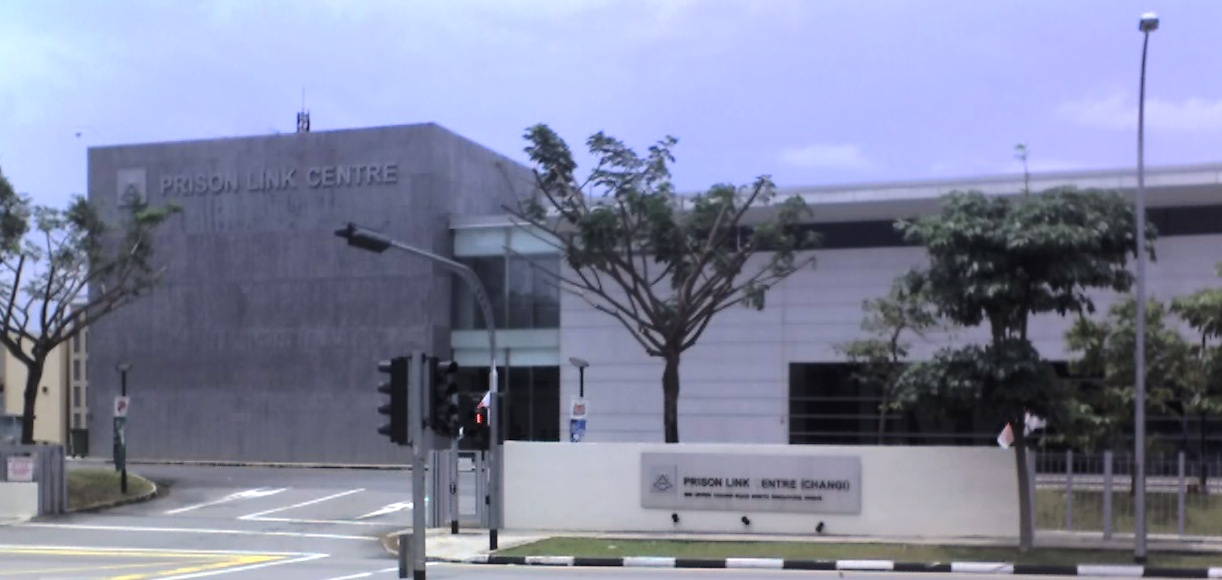
Changi Prison, where Haw was hanged in 1982 for the double murder.

After losing his final death row plea, 41-year-old Haw Tua Tau was hanged at Changi Prison in 1982, but the exact date of his execution is unknown.

== Aftermath ==
The Privy Council's ruling in the appeal of Haw was a landmark case in Singapore's legal history. This coined some of the major legal principles of Singapore's judicial system, which gave the prosecution the right to proceed with their cases against any defendants in Singapore, should there be sufficient evidence to satisfy the elements of the charge and made up a prima facie case for the defendant to answer in court, and this ruling also gave judges the power to convict defendants in such cases where an accused(s) refused to put up a defence and left the prosecution's case unrebutted, which would be the reason to warrant a conviction of the accused. This requirement became known as the "Haw Tua Tau test". The Haw Tua Tau test was first used in 1982 when the prosecution successfully appealed to overturn the acquittal of 42-year-old civil supervisor Abdul Ghani Mohd Mustapha, who was charged with receiving bribery, and a re-trial was conducted to call for Abdul Ghani to put up a defence. The re-trial concluded in 1983 with Abdul Ghani being acquitted a second time.

The landmark principles of Haw's case also had a legal effect in the Malaysian legal system and those of the other Commonwealth countries. However, during the appeal of a drug trafficker Arulpragasan Sandaraju in 1996, the Haw Tua Tau test was overruled by a majority decision of four to three from the Federal Court of Malaysia, after it deemed through Arulpragasan's appeal that the burden of proof by the prosecution should be the higher requirement of proving all elements of a case beyond a reasonable doubt at the end of its case, before the defence should be called to give an answer, rather than deploying the Haw Tua Tau test. This led to the acquittal of Arulpragasam for trafficking 1.2 kg of diamorphine, and it also enabled a hockey coach M Mahendran to succeed in his appeal to overturn his conviction and sentence of ten years' jail with four strokes of the cane for raping a student. A similar decision by Malaysia overruling the Haw Tua Tau test was also made in March the year before when the Federal Court of Malaysia heard the appeal of drug trafficker Khoo Hi Chiang; Khoo's appeal was dismissed despite the rejection of the Haw Tua Tau test. Over 200 death row cases in Malaysia were also seeing the possibility of having their cases reviewed in light of the Federal Court's ruling on the Haw Tua Tau case.

This ruling made an effect on Malaysian laws and led to a proposed reform in November 1996. The reforms in Malaysia did not have an effect in Singapore as the legal professionals of Singapore stated that the Haw Tua Taw test itself was a testament to two different views on how the defendant should receive the right to a fair trial, and the main focus of the Singaporean judicial system was to ensure that the guilty parties would not escape from justice. The two cases of Haw and Oh Laye Koh, a school bus driver who was hanged on 19 May 1995 for murdering a 17-year-old schoolgirl, were cited as the notable cases where the Singapore judicial system had demonstrated the ability of not allowing the guilty parties to go scot-free and escape justice, based on the requirement for the prosecution to put forward enough evidence that may prove their case against an accused and the right for judges to make an adverse inference from an accused's decision to remain silent, the latter which played an instrumental role behind the conviction of Oh during his re-trial for killing the student. Some lawyers in Singapore also questioned the use of the Haw Tua Tau test in many cases as they felt it made the prosecution having an easier job in securing a conviction for an accused, and they called for a higher tier of requirement for the prosecution to present a case that was sufficiently proven beyond a reasonable doubt and so sufficient that an accused was bound to put up his defence.

Notably, in January 1995, the case of Haw Tua Tau was referenced to by Malaysian lawyer Karpal Singh, who was defending a convicted gunman Ng Theng Shuang during his appeal against the death penalty. Ng, a Malaysian, was sentenced to hang in September 1994 for having illegally discharged his firearm and shot a Cisco officer during a firearm robbery in Singapore, and based on the Malaysian courts' stand, Singh argued that the Singapore jurisdiction should not continue practicing the Haw Tua Tau test to avoid the unfairness of calling an accused to answer to the prosecution's case when it was not sufficiently proven beyond a reasonable doubt like in his client's case, a contention which the Court of Appeal rejected when dismissing Ng's appeal, after they found there was sufficient evidence to prosecute and convict Ng of the offence charged, and Ng was subsequently hanged on 14 July 1995. The test itself was discussed among lawyers, with some agreeing to its application while some also believing that it was more sound to have a case proven beyond a reasonable doubt by the prosecution before calling for the accused to present his defence in court.

In December 1999, the case of Haw Tua Tau was listed as one of the ten most significant landmark cases that made an everlasting impact on Singapore's legal history during the 20th century era of Singapore.

On 28 October 2009, Law Minister K Shanmugam delivered a speech to the New York State Bar Association in the United States. In his speech about the Singapore judicial system, Shanmugam cited the case of Haw Tua Tau when coming to the topic of giving judges the power to draw an adverse inference from an accused's refusal to enter his defence, even though an accused cannot be compelled to testify in his own defence. He said the choice to remain silent was deemed a failure of the defendant to rebut the charge and evidence presented by the prosecution, and this was reasonable for the judge to draw an adverse inference from that decision to remain silent and thus convict an accused in a court of law.

== See also ==
- Capital punishment in Singapore
