= Ayerst (Inspector of Taxes) v C&K (Construction) Ltd =

- Court: House of Lords
- Full case name: Ayerst (Inspector of Taxes) v C&K (Construction) Ltd
- Decided: 21 May 1975
- Citation: [1976] AC 167

Court membership
- Judges sitting: Lord Diplock; Viscount Dilhorne; Lord Kilbrandon; Lord Edmund Davies

Case opinions
- Decision by: Lord Diplock

Ayerst (Inspector of Taxes) v C&K (Construction) Ltd [1976] AC 167 was a decision of the House of Lords relating to revenue law and insolvency law which confirmed that where a company goes into insolvent liquidation it ceases to be the beneficial owner of its assets, and the liquidator holds those assets on a special "statutory trust" for the company's creditors.

== Facts ==
Mactrac Ltd was a company carrying on the business of builders and civil engineers. Mactrac Ltd was the beneficial owner of 100% of the issued share capital in C&K (Construction) Ltd. On 3 March 1962 a receiver was appointed with respect to Mactrac Ltd by a debenture holder. Accounts would later show that at this time the company had a deficiency of assets against liabilities in the total sum of £389,977. On 21 May 1962 a petition of the compulsory winding-up of Mactrac Ltd was presented, and an order to that effect was made on 4 June 1962.

On 18 January 1963 the receiver (with the approval of the liquidator) sold all of the assets and undertaking of Mactrac Ltd to its wholly owned subsidiary, C&K (Construction) Ltd. On that date the unrelieved tax losses incurred Mactrac Ltd in its trade were £326,486 and it had a further £82,025 in unrelieved capital allowances. The receiver then sold the entire share capital of C&K (Construction) Ltd. to an outside purchaser. When the appellant company was assessed for tax, it claimed to be able to set-off the unrelieved losses and capital allowances of Mactrac under section 17 of the Finance Act 1954.

The central question in relation to the claim for tax relief was whether trade was "carried on" up until the date of the sale. Accordingly, for the purposes of the relevant analysis the only real question in the appeal was whether a company in liquidation (Mactrac Ltd) remained the beneficial owner of its assets.

== Judgment ==
The sole judgment of the House of Lords was given by Lord Diplock. His short judgment started by encapsulating the issue:

My Lords, the only question that has been argued in your Lordships' House is whether when a company is ordered to be wound up under the Companies Act 1948 the effect of the winding-up order is to divest the company of the "beneficial ownership" of its assets within the meaning of that expression as it is used under section 17(6)(a) of the Finance Act 1954.

His Lordship then reviewed the relief provisions in the Finance Act before turning to the effect of a winding-up order, holding that the principal effects of the statutory regime were that:

1. the custody and control of all the company's property are transferred to the liquidation (under section 243);
2. the duty of the liquidator is to collect all of the assets and apply them in discharge of its liabilities (section 257(1)); and
3. all powers of dealing with the company's assets are exercisable by the liquidator for the benefit of those persons only who are entitled to share in the proceeds of realisation of the assets under the statutory scheme. The company itself can never be entitled to any part of those proceeds, and after the completion of the winding-up it is dissolved (section 274).

The court noted that unlike the bankruptcy of a person, the winding-up of a company does not transfer legal title to the company's property to the liquidator. They referred to the comments of Lord Cairns in the decision of In re Albert Life Assurance Co., The Delhi Bank's case where he had held that upon winding-up the assets of a company become impressed by a trust, and the decision of the Court of Appeal in In re Oriental Inland Steam Co, and in particular the comment of Mellish LJ that "[i]t appears to me that that does, in strictness, constitute a trust for the benefit of all creditors". Lord Diplock noted that the editors of Buckley on the Companies Acts had treated that statement as authoritative from 1897 to the present time, and that Lord Diplock was content that this was correct.

His Lordship then considered arguments by the appellants that Parliament may have intended something different when they used the term "beneficial ownership" in the Finance Act, which he also dismissed.

== Commentary ==
Although the decision has never subsequently been doubted, commentators were quick to point out that "trust" is not used in the strictly technical term, as none of the creditors have any specific interest in the trust property. Other commentators have noted that "[i]t has long been objected that there is no real trust of the property of a company in liquidation and 'trust' should be used only as a convenient way of describing the status of property in a liquidation, not as a categorisation with legal consequences".

Subsequent cases have held that neither the company nor any other person has a beneficial interest in the assets of a company in liquidation. However, the decision has not been followed in Australia.

== See also ==
- United Kingdom insolvency law
