= United Dominions Trust Ltd v Kirkwood =

- Court: Court of Appeal
- Full case name: United Dominions Trust Ltd v Kirkwood
- Citation: [1966] 2 QB 431

Court membership
- Judges sitting: Lord Denning MR, Diplock LJ, Harman LJ

Keywords
- banking business

United Dominions Trust Ltd v Kirkwood [1966] 2 QB 431 was a decision of the Court of Appeal relating to what constitutes "banking business" as a matter of English law.

Ellinger's Modern Banking Law refers to the judgment as a "landmark decision".

== Facts ==
United Dominions Trust was a finance company which brought an action to recover payment of a loan which it had made to a dealer. The dealer defended the claim for repayment on the basis that the United Dominions Trust was not registered under the Moneylenders Act 1900 and hence the loan contract was unlawful. United Dominions Trust claimed that it was exempt under section 6(d) of that Act because it conducted "banking business". In support of this it argued that it was recognised in the City as a bank, it enjoyed certain privileges given only to banks, and it had a clearing number.

== Judgment ==
All three judges gave reasoned judgments.

The court considered an older Australian decision, Commissioners of the State Savings Bank of Victoria v Permewan, Wright and Co Ltd (1915)1 19 CLR 457 where Issacs J said (at 470):

The essential characteristics of the business of banking are, however, all that are necessary to bring the appellants within the scope of the enactments; and these may be described as the collection of money by receiving deposits upon loan, repayable when and as expressly or impliedly agreed upon, and the utilisation of the money so collected by lending it again in such sums as are required.

The court also considered decisions in Bank of Chettinad Ltd of Colombo v Commissioner of Income Tax, Colombo [1948] AC 378, 383 (PC); Banbury v Bank of Montreal [1918] AC 626 and Woods v Martins Bank Ltd [1959] 1 QB 5.

Lord Denning MR opined that normally a company would only constitute a bank if it undertook certain activities: (1) the acceptance of money from, and the collection of cheques for, customers and the placing of the funds to the customers’ credit; (2) honouring cheques or orders drawn on the bank by their customers when presented for payment and the debiting of the customers' accounts accordingly; and (3) keeping some form of current or running accounts for the entries of customers' credits and debits. But he further added that a company might still constitute a bank, even though it did not undertake these activities if it was regarded as a bank by other bankers. He stated that "[l]ike many other beings, a banker is easier to recognise than to define. In case of doubt, it is, I think, permissible to look at the reputation of the firm amongst ordinary intelligent commercial men." He also argued that when a business is running as a bank, judges should be reluctant to hold that it is not a bank.

Harman LJ (dissenting) thought the defining feature of a bank was the maintenance of current accounts, including deposit or savings accounts where notice is required before withdrawal of funds. The collection of cheques was "an additional requirement", but not an essential feature of a bank. Therefore, he opined, United Dominion Trust was not a banker because it did not operate current accounts. He acknowledged that it was regarded as such by other bankers, he regarded this as insufficient to make it a bank itself.

Diplock LJ stated:

What I think is common to all modern definitions and essential to the carrying on of the business of banking is that the banker should accept from his customers loans of money on "deposit," that is to say, loans for an indefinite period upon running account, repayable as to the whole or any part thereof upon demand by the customer either without notice or upon an agreed period of notice.

Both Lord Denning and Diplock LJ seemed to have been influenced by the consequence of not finding United Dominions Trust to be a banker within the meaning of the legislation, which would have meant that potentially thousands of agreements would have been rendered unenforceable. The court accepted that whilst acceptance of deposits was a necessary condition of being a bank, it was not of itself a sufficient condition. An institution cannot be a bank unless it opens on behalf of customers current accounts which are operable by cheque and into which customers can pay cheques and other financial instruments for collection.

== Commentary ==
The decision of the Court of Appeal has now been largely superseded for banking regulatory purposes in terms of defining what constitutes a bank - firstly by the Banking Act 1979 and then by the Financial Services and Markets Act 2000. However, the decision remains important for determination of who constitutes a banker (and accordingly, a customer) for the purposes of bankers' rights and duties at common law.

== See also ==
- Financial Services Authority v Anderson [2010] EWHC 599 (18 March 2010)
