= Lex Autolease =

Vehicle leasing company in the UK

Lex Autolease Limited
- Company type: Subsidiary
- Industry: Consumer Finance
- Founded: 1959 as Lex and Autolease; 2009 as Lex Autolease
- Headquarters: London, England, UK
- Key people: Richard Jones (Managing Director)
- Products: Vehicle Leasing
- Parent: Lloyds Banking Group
- Website: www.lexautolease.co.uk

Lex Autolease was created in May 2009 from the merger of HBOS-owned Lex Vehicle Leasing with Lloyds TSB Autolease, and is currently the largest vehicle leasing business in the United Kingdom, with a fleet of about 385,000 vehicles. One in every thirty new cars sold in the UK is through Lex Autolease.

== History ==
The company can trace its origins back to 1959, when both Lex and Autolease were established. Lex was established in the 1920s and in 1959 it acquired British Colonial Motors, which allowed it to enter the contract hire business. In 1969, it acquired Controlled Cost Motoring, established Lombard Contract Hire in 1983 and acquired Fleetdrive in 1988. Autolease was established in 1959 by Britax, which also owned Bristol Street Motors.

Through mergers, a company called Lex Vehicle Leasing emerged. By 2005, it was owned by Aviva as part of their RAC plc company. From 2006 to 2009, it was owned by HBOS.

Following the acquisition of HBOS by Lloyds TSB Group, which had owned Autolease since 2000, the new Lloyds Banking Group merged the two operations into the new Lex Autolease. At the time of the merger Lex was carrying a debt of £2.4 billion.

In the first decade of the 21st century, Lex lost a number of large contracts such as HSBC Vehicle Finance, Ford Business Partner and Volvo. In 2014, Lex opened a new multi-million pound car supermarket and vehicle processing centre in Coventry, which created 30 jobs. However, within two years the centre had closed.

== See also ==
- Black Horse
