= Murder of Liang Shan Shan =

1989 murder case in Singapore

Liang Shan Shan
- Born: c. 1972; Sabah, Malaysia
- Died: 2 October 1989 (aged 17); Yishun, Singapore
- Other names: Leong San San; Leong Shan Shan
- Occupation: Student
- Known for: Murder victim

Liang Shan Shan (Note: Her English name was also spelt as Leong San San or Leong Shan Shan.) (c. 1972 – 2 October 1989; Chinese: 梁珊珊; pinyin: Liáng Shānshān; Pha̍k-fa-sṳ: Liòng Sân-sân) (Note: Her Chinese name was also spelt as 梁姗姗 Liáng Shānshān) was a 17-year-old Malaysian schoolgirl who was reported missing in Singapore on 2 October 1989. Liang was found dead nearly two weeks later at Yishun Industrial Park, where her highly decomposed body was discovered by a group of National Servicemen who were training nearby that area. Despite conducting a post-mortem examination, the cause of Liang's death was uncertain due to the high state of decomposition and disappearance of certain body parts. Police investigations revealed that prior to her disappearance and murder, Liang was last seen boarding her school bus and left the school at 1pm on 2 October 1989, the same day she went missing.

The school bus driver, 34-year-old Oh Laye Koh (Chinese: 胡立国; pinyin: Hú Lìguó; Pe̍h-ōe-jī: Ô͘ li̍p-kok), was arrested as a suspect for Liang's alleged murder, solely based on circumstantial evidence against him. Although Oh was acquitted in 1992, the prosecution's appeal resulted in a re-trial and Oh was called to the stand to give his defence. However, Oh refused to go to the stand and chose to remain silent. At the end of the re-trial, Oh was found guilty of murder and sentenced to death due to his decision to remain silent which "arose from a consciousness of guilt" and the strong circumstantial evidence pointing to Oh's guilt for the crime. Oh Laye Koh, who was also the suspected killer of an 18-year-old woman found murdered in 1982, later lost his appeal, and he was eventually hanged at Changi Prison on 19 May 1995 for the two murders.

== Disappearance and death ==
=== Missing person report ===
On 2 October 1989, 17-year-old Liang Shan Shan, a third-year arts student of Mayflower Secondary School, did not return home at 1:20 PM as she usually did. After 3:00 PM, Liang's mother, Quek Meng Ghet, still did not see her daughter return home to their Balestier Road flat. Quek contacted her daughter's friends, but none of them saw Liang after the school dismissal and her departure from school at 1:00 PM. According to her background information in several news reports, Liang was the eldest of seven children in the family, and had four brothers (one of them studied at the same school as Liang) and two sisters. Her father Leong Kon Sang (Chinese: 梁天生; pinyin: Liáng Tiānshēng; Pha̍k-fa-sṳ: Liòng thiên-sâng) was a contractor. Liang and her whole family were all Malaysians who immigrated from the Malaysian state of Sabah to Singapore six years prior, in 1983.

Liang's father reported her missing, and put up a reward for information related to her whereabouts. Liang's parents stated that their eldest daughter was normally obedient and had no hobbies, and she only hung out with her female friends outdoors. There were also no family arguments at home prior to Liang's disappearance. Tang Swee Chay, then school principal of Mayflower Secondary School, stated that he and the school teachers questioned Liang's classmates, who all confirmed Liang was last seen leaving school, and there were no suspicious persons seen around the school compound and its nearby areas. She was known to be a quiet student at school.

=== Discovery of corpse and autopsy ===
On 14 October 1989, twelve days after Liang Shan Shan disappeared, a group of National Servicemen were training at Yishun Industrial Park. While they were training in the area, Reservist Lieutenant Chong Pin Siong and three of his fellow recruits stumbled upon the highly decomposed corpse of a teenage girl in the park's forested vacant area. The police were contacted, and the investigation team, together with forensic pathologist Chao Tzee Cheng, arrived at the scene. First-hand reports revealed that several body parts of the victim were scattered around the area, which was frequently used by military conscripts for training, and it was speculated that the victim had been dead for about twelve days. The nametag on a school uniform blouse found nearby showed the victim's name, "Liang Shan Shan". The alleged skull of Liang was located about a metre away from the body.

It was later confirmed that the corpse did belong to Liang. Professor Chao conducted an autopsy on Liang's corpse. He discovered injuries to the right side of Liang's ribcage, and the right cheekbone of Liang's skull, which were possibly caused either by a fall or an impact from a blunt and hard object. However, he could not ascertain the cause of death. Professor Chao could not tell whether it was a suicide, murder or accident due to the highly advanced state of decomposition and the fact that some body parts were missing. The injuries he found on the skull and ribs were not sufficient to cause death. There were no strong signs of sexual assault due to the high state of decomposition, though her skirt did indicate signs of being forcibly pulled by someone.

== Investigation and murder charges ==
=== Arrest of the school bus driver ===
Police investigations were conducted and detectives began interviewing Liang Shan Shan's classmates and family members. One of Liang's male classmates, Huang Chendong, revealed that he witnessed Liang getting on her school bus around 1:00 PM, and the school bus left the school with Liang, alone, sitting on the bus. The school bus driver was identified as Oh Laye Koh, a 34-year-old Singaporean who was married with one son and resided at Ang Mo Kio. He had driven Liang to school for the past five years.

Oh was brought in for questioning, and he was later placed under official arrest. On 18 October 1989, Oh was charged with murder in relation to Liang's death at a local district court. If found guilty of murder under Singapore law, Oh Laye Koh would face the death penalty.

=== Oh Laye Koh's second murder charge and remand ===
Rohayah binti Mohd Ali, the suspected first victim of Oh Laye Koh.

On 8 November 1989, a month after he was charged for Liang's alleged murder, Oh was also charged with the murder of 18-year-old Rohayah (or Norhayah) binti Mohd Ali, a lounge waitress who was found murdered on 6 October 1982 at a construction site in Ang Mo Kio, which was the same location where the current campus of St Nicholas Girls' School would be built in 1985. Rohayah, who was stabbed several times in the throat, was also originally reported missing under similar circumstances as Liang and a coroner's court in 1984 issued a verdict of murder by person(s) unknown. Her murder remained unsolved for seven years before Oh was found to be the last person seen with Rohayah while he was under investigation for Liang's murder, which led to the second murder charge.

Oh was held under remand without bail for the two murder charges, and under a court order, he was assessed by a psychiatrist while in remand to determine his mental state at the time of the offences. On 22 October 1989, the skeletal remains of Liang were returned to the family for cremation and funeral preparations after Professor Chao completed the post-mortem examination.

On 5 July 1990, after some pre-trial conferences, the magistrate Chan Wang Ho from the district court was satisfied that there was sufficient evidence against Oh for the charges of murdering both Liang and Rohayah, and ordered both cases to be transferred to the High Court. A date was set for Oh to face trial for the two killings.

== First trial and acquittal ==
=== Prosecution's case ===
On 17 August 1992, 37-year-old Oh Laye Koh stood trial in the High Court for the murder of Liang Shan Shan. Deputy Public Prosecutor Jennifer Marie (who would prosecute British serial killer John Martin Scripps for killing three tourists in 1995) led the prosecution, while Oh was represented by lawyers Ramesha Pillai and Alan Wong. Judicial Commissioner Amarjeet Singh was the presiding judge.

At the start of the prosecution's case, Liang's family and classmates showed up as trial witnesses for the prosecution. According to Liang's classmates, they testified that Liang apparently detested her school bus driver, who sometimes verbally harassed her, complimenting her on her slim figure and saying she was beautiful and attractive. There was one time where Oh actually tried to take a photo of Liang. One of the classmates, Pan Fenyi, testified that after Liang's disappearance and death, she was contacted by Oh, who asked her to lie to the authorities and in court that she never saw Liang boarding her school bus on the date she disappeared.

The prosecution based their case solely on circumstantial evidence. Among the circumstantial evidence, there was evidence showing that Oh forged an alibi. Despite the fact that he was seen driving the school bus Liang last boarded before her disappearance, Oh denied that he was there at the time Liang left the school, and he claimed at around 1:00 PM, he was at a friend's workshop fixing the faulty brakes of his school bus. This alibi was first presented to Liang's father when he suspected and confronted Oh during the twelve days before the discovery of his daughter's corpse. However, the mechanic, Tan Eng Dee, testified in court that Oh did go to his workshop on that day to repair his school bus, but he came at 9:00 AM instead of 1:00 PM. Not only that, Oh was able to lead the police investigators to the location where Liang's school bag and textbooks were abandoned, which were a short distance from where her corpse was discovered, providing another connection between Oh and Liang's death.

Oh denied being involved in the disappearance and alleged murder of Liang. Oh's lawyers argued in court that Oh's police statements were not made voluntarily and he was abused by his police interrogators during questioning before he complied and gave incriminating statements.

=== Verdict and acquittal ===
On 11 September 1992, 37-year-old Oh Laye Koh was acquitted of Liang's murder, as the trial judge Amarjeet Singh found insufficient evidence against him. Given that there was only circumstantial, but no direct, evidence linking Oh to the death of Liang in the prosecution's case, Singh decided to not let Oh come to the stand to give his defence and granted him a discharge amounting to an acquittal.

However, Oh's joy was short-lived, as the prosecution filed an appeal against this decision. Oh Laye Koh also remained in remand behind bars to be investigated and face another trial for the second murder charge relating to the 1982 death of Norhayah binti Mohamed Ali while the prosecution's appeal to overturn his acquittal was pending. Liang's father was also distressed at the acquittal and wrote petitions to the Attorney-General's Chambers and the Government of Singapore, including one to then Senior Minister Lee Kuan Yew and then Prime Minister Goh Chok Tong to seek a review of his daughter's case.

== Re-trial and death penalty ==
=== Prosecution's appeal and re-trial ===
After Oh Laye Koh's acquittal, the prosecution filed an appeal against Oh's acquittal, arguing that Oh should give his evidence on the stand and citing several key areas of the circumstantial evidence that called for Oh's explanation. They pointed to the alleged guilt of Oh for crimes related to Liang's death, including the fake alibi and lies he made to the police and Liang's family and acquaintances. After hearing the appeal, the Court of Appeal found that the circumstantial evidence against Oh was sufficient to form a mens rea case and hence, they allowed the prosecution's appeal in March 1994 and ordered Oh to be taken back to the High Court for a re-trial.

On 27 April 1994, Oh once again stood trial at the High Court, with the original trial judge, Judicial Commissioner Amarjeet Singh, slated to hear the case a second time. Singh called upon Oh to come to the stand to give his defence. However, Oh chose to remain silent, and he did not call any witnesses to his defence. Although Oh's lawyer Ramesha Pillai argued that the whole of evidence fell short of the legal requirements to substantiate a charge of murder, citing the prosecution's lack of direct evidence to show that Liang's death was caused by unlawful violence, DPP Jennifer Marie rebutted that Oh was able to lead the police to the area where the victim's belongings were found; he had tried to establish a false alibi; had told lies to Liang's parents and friends to distance himself from any guilt related to Liang's death; and Oh's attempt to persuade trial witnesses to lie that Liang never boarded his bus that day. For this, the prosecution pursued a guilty verdict of murder in Oh's case. The verdict was reserved till 3 May 1994.

=== Re-trial verdict ===
Oh Laye Koh

Six days later, on 3 May 1994, Singh made his final verdict on the case.

In his judgement, Singh stated that he was satisfied that Oh's failure to give evidence "arose from a consciousness of guilt" in the face of the circumstantial evidence, and thus drew an adverse inference from Oh's silence. He also accepted the prosecution's arguments and determined that none of the circumstantial evidence was able to show explanatory signs of Oh's supposed innocence after the review of the whole case. He stated the failure of the prosecution to prove the cause of death or exact crime was not a reason to find Oh not guilty.

In his verdict, Singh cited in his own words:

I am constrained to draw an irresistable inference, that you (Oh) were the last person to see the deceased (Liang) and you had intentionally caused her death and that the death was not suicidal or accidental. Although the prosecution was unable to identify the unlawful act, it is not necessary, in my opinion always to do so.

As such, 38-year-old Oh Laye Koh was found guilty of murder in relation to 17-year-old Liang Shan Shan's death, and consequently, he was sentenced to death. Oh, who was at first smiling, chatting with the guards and waving at his family and friends prior to the verdict, was reportedly shocked and filled with horror after the guilty verdict was interpreted to him in Hokkien (a common Chinese language variety). Before Oh was taken out of the courtroom, he shouted in Hokkien, "It is unfair! It is unfair!".

After Oh was sentenced to death for Liang's murder, the prosecution withdrew the second murder charge against Oh for killing his first victim, Rohayah binti Mohamed Ali, back in 1982.

== Legal effect ==
The case of Oh Laye Koh was reported to be the first case where a person acquitted of a crime was sentenced to death for the same offence charged in a re-trial. Oh's conviction based on the exercise of the right to remain silent and circumstantial evidence was also widely reported and reviewed by many lawyers who paid attention to the case and its unusual nature. Legal experts analyzed Oh's case and stated that while the right to remain silent was a valid legal option in Singapore, it deprived a defendant of the chance to rebut the prosecution's case and the judge is allowed to make an adverse inference from the defendant's silence, which may potentially cause a defendant to be found guilty of whichever crime he was charged for in a court of law.

Oh's case was also the second conviction of murder secured solely based on circumstantial evidence in Singapore's legal history, after the high-profile Sunny Ang case back in 1965, in which Ang was convicted of his girlfriend Jenny Cheok's murder in the absence of the body, and also based on circumstantial evidence. The case of the former school bus driver would become one of the few cases (which also included child killer Took Leng How) where a defendant was convicted as charged after choosing to remain silent and not putting up their defence.

The case of Oh Laye Koh, as well as the unrelated 1976 case of Haw Tua Tau, a hawker who was executed in 1982 for murdering Phoon Ah Leong and Phoon's mother Hu Yuen Keng, were discussed in the aftermath of Oh's re-trial as the iconic cases that proved how Singapore's criminal law made it difficult for the guilty to go free, based on the established legal principles of drawing an adverse inference from the defendant's decision to remain silent and the prosecution's right to proceed a case against the suspect based on any tangible evidence to back the charge. Oh's case was also crucial to helping Thai construction worker Somporn Chinpakdhee to escape both the murder charge and death penalty for the unsolved killing of his colleague Kulap Nophakhun, as the circumstantial evidence against Somporn was not strong enough to convict him of murder, which resulted in the courts acquitting Somporn in November 1994.

== Appeal and execution ==
On 29 July 1994, Oh Laye Koh's appeal against his sentence was dismissed by the Court of Appeal, as the three judges - Chief Justice Yong Pung How and Judges of Appeal L P Thean and M Karthigesu - unanimously agreed that the prosecution's case against Oh, based on circumstantial evidence, was strong enough to prove Oh's guilt, coupled by Oh's decision to waive his right to make his defence. Oh was reportedly angered at his failure to escape the death sentence and over ten of his family members (including his wife, who wept in court) and acquaintances were present to hear the verdict. Amnesty International, an international human rights group, appealed to the Government of Singapore for clemency and asked that Oh's sentence be commuted to life imprisonment. Oh also submitted a plea for presidential clemency, but the petition was denied on 5 April 1995.

On 19 May 1995, 39-year-old Oh Laye Koh was hanged at Changi Prison at dawn. His lawyer, Peter Fernando, who represented Oh during his appeal process, stated in a 2003 interview that Oh was one of his "most difficult clients", as he kept insisting his innocence and never showed any remorse for his crime even up till the moment of his hanging. Fernando stated that he had no doubt that justice was indeed served in this case due to his sympathy over Liang Shan Shan's unfortunate and "vicious" death. On the same day of Oh's execution at the same timing, two drug traffickers Hartej Sidhu (a 35-year-old Indian citizen) and Sarjit Singh (a 55-year-old Singaporean) were also executed after being found guilty in January 1993.

== In the media ==
The case of Liang Shan Shan's murder was re-enacted in a Singaporean crime show named True Files. It first aired as the fourth episode of the show's second season on 16 September 2003. Oh Laye Koh was portrayed by "Fish" Chaar Chun Kong while Liang Shan Shan was portrayed by Audrey Ong. Oh's lawyer for the appeal, Peter Fernando, agreed to be interviewed on-screen in the episode itself.

The case of Liang's death became one of the iconic cases of renowned forensic pathologist Chao Tzee Cheng, who died in 2000. Singaporean crime show Whispers of the Dead, which features famous cases solved by Professor Chao, re-enacted the case and aired it as the sixth episode of the show's second and final season. While most aspects of the case were faithful to the real-life events of Liang's murder, the names of Liang, Oh and the trial witnesses were changed to protect their identities and for dramatic purposes; for example, Liang's name was changed to Chan Mei Shan while Oh's name was changed to Toh Lai Boon. Actress Chan Jia Jing portrayed the murder victim, while the actor who portrayed the school bus driver was uncredited.

In 2022, another Singaporean crime show, titled Inside Crime Scene, also re-enacted the Liang Shan Shan murder case and aired the adaptation as its third episode.

== See also ==
- Sunny Ang
- Circumstantial evidence
- Capital punishment in Singapore
- List of major crimes in Singapore
- List of solved missing person cases
