= Black Horse (finance company) =

Company

Black Horse Limited
- Company type: Subsidiary
- Industry: Consumer finance
- Founded: July 2001; 24 years ago (1922; 104 years ago as UDT)
- Headquarters: London, England, UK
- Products: Car finance
- Parent: Lloyds Banking Group
- Website: www.blackhorse.co.uk

Black Horse Limited is a motor finance company based in London, England. It was formed in July 2001, as a wholly owned subsidiary of Lloyds Banking Group, but its origins can be traced back to 1922.

The business should not be confused with Black Horse (originally Beehive and most recently Lloyds TSB) Life Assurance Company, whose interests were amalgamated into Scottish Widows in September 2004.

== History ==
Following the creation of Lloyds TSB Group in 1998, the businesses of Lloyds Bowmaker (formerly Lloyds and Scottish) and United Dominions Trust were combined into Lloyds UDT. In September 2000, Lloyds TSB acquired Chartered Trust, and, in June 2001, the business of Chartered Trust was merged into the business of Lloyds UDT, and the enlarged operation rebadged under the Black Horse name, to form the asset finance division of Lloyds TSB.

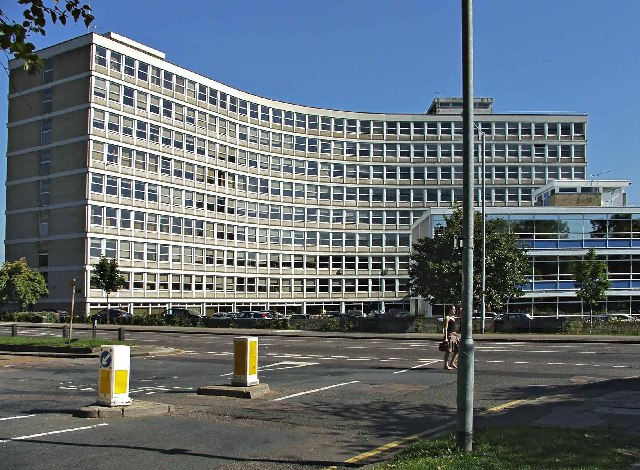
Former headquarters of the United Dominions Trust, Cockfosters.

=== United Dominions Trust ===
The origins of UDT go back to 1919, when the Continental Guaranty Corporation of New York established a branch in the City of London, which concentrated mainly on providing finance for the British motor trade. The business of the branch was transferred to a separate company in 1922, which was registered in England as the Continental Guaranty Corporation Ltd.

In 1923, the company was acquired by British interests; in 1925, it converted to a public company and the name was changed to United Dominions Trust. Having been previously associated with Barclays Bank, in 1981, it became a subsidiary of the Trustee Savings Bank.

=== Lloyds Bowmaker ===
Bowmaker Limited was formed in 1926 and acquired by Lloyds and Scottish in 1982. Lloyds and Scottish was formed in 1958, by the acquisition of the Scottish Midland Guarantee Trust and Olds Discount Company by Lloyds Bank and the National Commercial Bank of Scotland (itself part owned by Lloyds Bank). In 1981, Lloyds Bank increased its shareholding in Lloyds and Scottish, taking full control of minority shareholdings in 1984, to form Lloyds Bowmaker.

=== Chartered Trust ===
In 1973, Standard and Chartered Banking Group acquired the whole of the share capital of The Hodge Group Limited not already owned by The Chartered Bank for £45 million. Sir Julian Hodge's other interests were divested to The Carlyle Trust (a company he owned) in 1976, and the consumer finance operation was renamed Chartered Trust; in September 2000, it was sold by Standard Chartered to Lloyds TSB for £627 million.

== See also ==
- Lex Autolease
- United Dominions Trust Ltd v Kirkwood
- R&B Customs Brokers Co Ltd v United Dominions Trust Ltd
