= R (National Federation of Self-Employed and Small Businesses Ltd) v Inland Revenue Commissioners =

UK constitutional law case

R (National Federation of Self-Employment and Small Businesses Ltd) v IRC
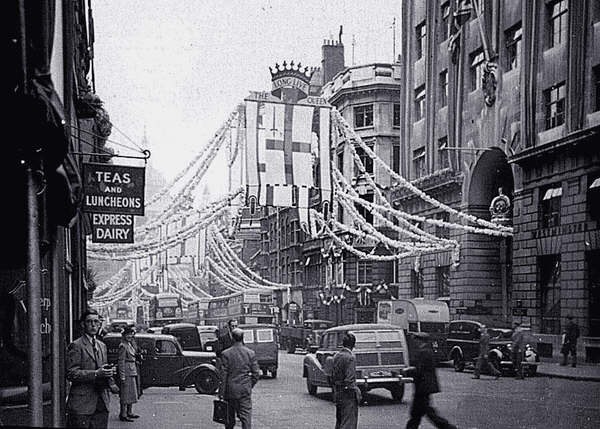
- Fleet Street
- Court: House of Lords
- Full case name: R (National Federation of Self-Employment and Small Businesses Ltd) v Inland Revenue Commissioners
- Citation: [1982] AC 617

Keywords
- Judicial review

R (NFSE) v IRC [1982] AC 617 is a UK constitutional law case, concerning judicial review.

== Facts ==
The NFSE, a group of taxpayers, claimed the Inland Revenue Commissioners' rules for levying tax on casual wages for Fleet Street newspaper staff, was unlawful. For many years, employees had given fictitious names to evade tax. The IRC agreed with employers and unions on a tax collection scheme for future years, and the previous two years in return for an undertaking by the IRC not to investigate earlier years. The NFSE argued they never got such favour, and argued the scheme was unlawful. It sought mandamus ordering the IRC to collect tax as required by law.

The Court of Appeal held the NFSE had sufficient interest in the matter for the application to be heard, and assumed the scheme was unlawful.

== Judgment ==
The Appellate Committee of the House of Lords held by a majority (Lord Wilberforce, Lord Fraser and Lord Roskill) that the NFSE did not have a sufficient interest in challenging decisions concerning other taxpayers, and nor did taxpayers generally in others affairs, unlike ratepayers (Arsenal FC v Ende [1979] AC 1). The question of sufficient interest had to be resolved in relation to what was known by the court of the matter under review, and on the evidence the tax scheme was a lawful exercise of the IRC's discretion.

Lord Fraser stressed the sufficient interest test was a logically prior question that had to be answered before any question of merits arose.

Lord Diplock dissented, holding the NFSE had sufficient interest but the case failed on its merits.

Lord Scarman disagreed with the majority, adopting a broader approach to standing but holding that the NFSE did not have a sufficient interest because they did not have an arguable case.

== See also ==
- United Kingdom constitutional law
