= Silkin v Beaverbrook Newspapers Ltd =

In Silkin v. Beaverbrook Newspapers Ltd., [1958] 1 W.L.R. 743, is an important British case.

The famous speech of Mr Justice Diplock in the High Court states succinctly the principle that freedom of speech is subject to the law and like any other freedom there is a balancing. In freedom of speech this right must be balanced against the essential need of the individuals to protect their reputation.

Diplock J. stated (at pp. 745–46):

Freedom of speech, like the other fundamental freedoms, is freedom under the law, and over the years the law has maintained a balance between, on the one hand, the right of the individual . . . whether he is in public life or not, to his unsullied reputation if he deserves it, and on the other hand . . . the right of the public . . . to express their views honestly and fearlessly on matters of public interest, even though that involves strong criticism of the conduct of public people.
