= Alex Josey =

British journalist and author (1910–1986)

Alexander Arthur Josey
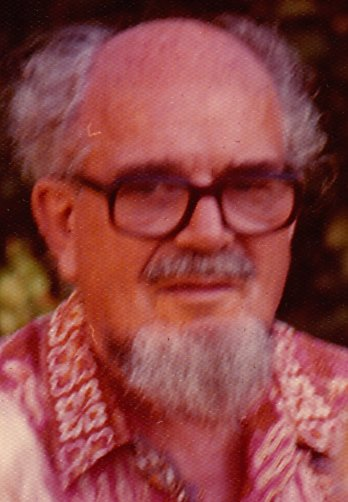
- Josey c. 1975
- Born: 3 April 1910; Poole, Dorset, England, United Kingdom
- Died: 15 October 1986 (aged 76); Tan Tock Seng Hospital, Novena, Singapore
- Occupation: Political journalist
- Known for: biographies on former Prime Minister of Singapore, Lee Kuan Yew and other political works
- Notable work: Lee Kuan Yew (1968 and 1980)
- Awards: Order of Freedom (Cambodia); Order of Merit (Egypt)

Alexander Arthur Josey (3 April 1910 – 15 October 1986) was a British-Singaporean journalist, political writer and commentator, biographer, and during WWII and the Malayan Emergency, a propagandist. He is best known for his biographies on the former Prime Minister of Singapore, Lee Kuan Yew, as well as: Democracy in Singapore: The 1970 By-Elections, Singapore: Its Past, Present and Future, Socialism in Asia, and Trade Unionism in Malaya.

Born in Poole, UK, Josey was an avid writer from an early age. He was also an avid cyclist, and was a founding member of the Pedal Club and resurrected the Poole Wheelers Cycling Club. He became assistant editor of Cycling under H. H. England and wrote the 12th edition of the Cycling Manual and Year Book.

During WWII, Josey was in charge of psychological warfare in Cairo and Palestine. After the war, he was in charge of psychological warfare against the terrorists during the Malayan Emergency. He was employed by Radio Malaya and later Radio Singapore as a political commentator and Controller of News. He wrote over twenty political novels and wrote many political articles on Singapore and Malaysia for various Singapore and international newspapers and journals. He became a good friend of Lee Kuan Yew who later became the Prime Minister of Singapore. He was the first foreign correspondent to be kicked out of Singapore (then part of Malaysia) by the Malaysian government. He returned to Singapore after its independence from Malaysia and became Prime Minister Lee Kuan Yew's Press Secretary for 10 years, and biographer and public relations officer. He later became the Publications Manager of the Singapore International Chamber of Commerce before being crippled by Parkinson's disease. Although planning to return to England due to the high cost of his medicine, he died aged 76 on 15 October 1986 at Tan Tock Seng Hospital, Singapore. His ashes are kept at the Singapore Casket, 131 Lavender Street, Singapore.

== Early life ==
In 1915–1923, Josey attended South Road Elementary School, until aged 14. He initially gained work in a factory, but in 1926, the factory joined the (National Strike), and so he decided to instead go in pursuit of his real objective which was writing and joined the local newspaper as a reporter working as a journalist on the Poole Herald and the Bournemouth Times. In 1926, he left for London and about the same time became a member of the Labour Party although he described himself as a very early socialist.

The same year he resurrected the Poole Wheelers Club along with his brother Cyril and became its Vice-President. He was still involved with them as late as 1940.

He was a member of the Road Racing Council 1926–1937 and the Road Time Trials Council 1937–43 of which he was National Secretary.

He was a founding member of the Pedal Club in 1941 and the next year became assistant editor of Cycling magazine under H. H. England, where he is credited as having written the 12th edition of the Cycling Manual and Year Book.

He was a keen collector of books and papers of historical interest on cycling, his collection archived at the University of Warwick library.

== Journalism ==
In 1941, he left London, joined the Air Force and was promoted to officer. Because of his journalism skills, he was recruited for duties in psychological warfare and transferred to Cairo. After Cairo, he was moved to Palestine circa 1946 as there was 'trouble brewing' and worked in Palestine Broadcasting Service as Controller of Programmes in charge of psychological warfare until the end of mandate in 1947/48. While in Palestine he helped the local cabaret girls form their own union. He was briefly lent by the Air Force to the Palestine Government to look after their public relations, but when the work ended he returned to England.

While in England he was married and lived for a short while in Wimbledon. His wife went out to Malaysia with him but didn't like it there so she went back to the UK and they were eventually divorced.

He briefly worked in Paris for Jackie Lane, the Secretary of the United Nations.

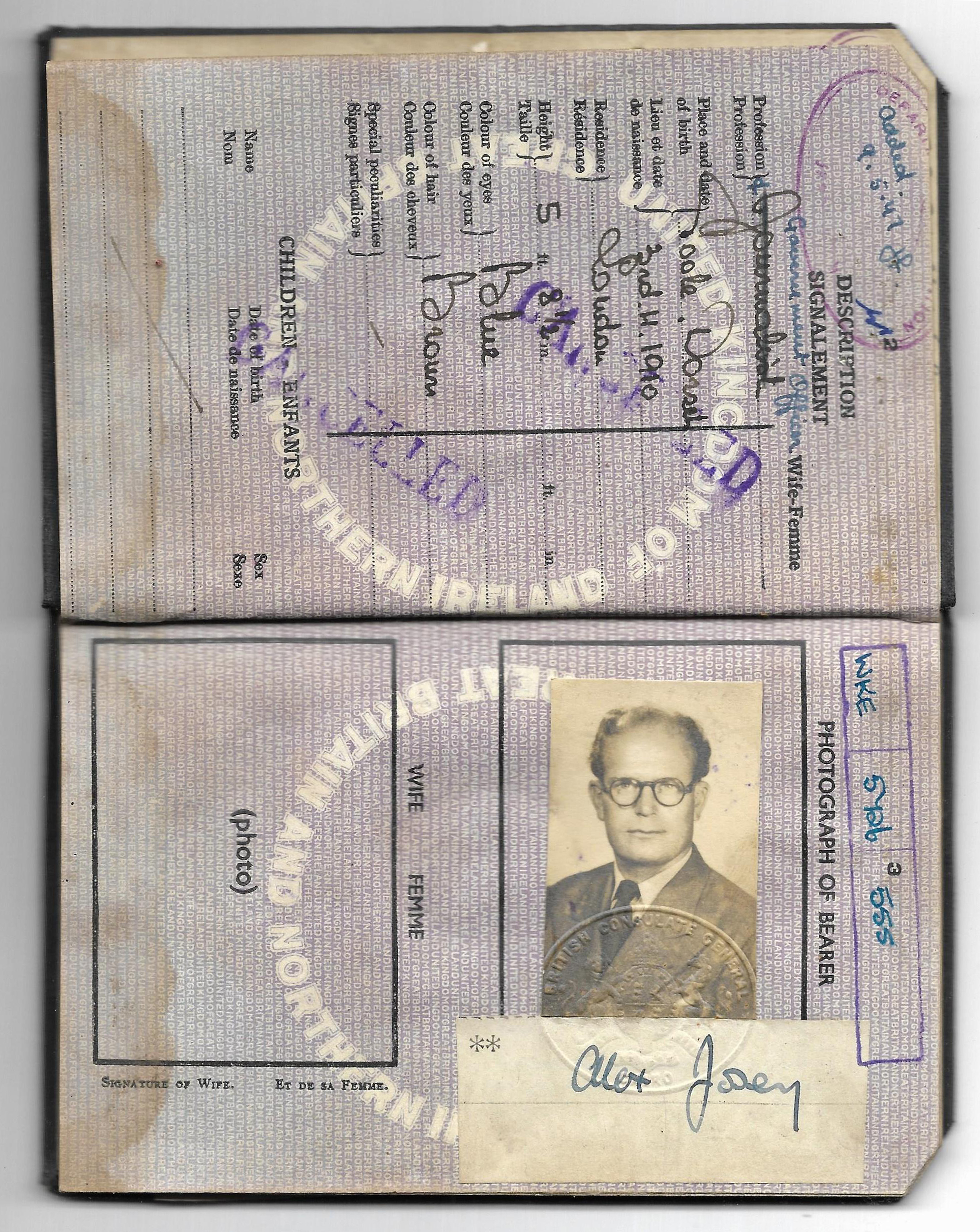
Alex Josey's 1946 British passport used for Cairo & Jerusalem.

== Singapore ==
In 1949, Josey was encouraged by Sir Henry Gurney, the High Commissioner in Malaya to come over to Singapore and 'do psychological warfare against the Malayan Communist Party"

In early 1950, he became Staff Officer (Emergency Information), for the Emergency Information Service in Malaya (Controller of Emergency Broadcasting). His job was to intensify propaganda against the terrorists and to the public, through his position as Chief News Editor of Radio Malaya. After Gurney, his main support, was assassinated in an ambush on 6 October 1951, his services were 'no longer required' and his contract was not renewed.

Turning to freelancing for the Singapore Standard, he gained the permanent position of News Controller for Radio Singapore in 1951. It was while in this position he became friends with Lee Kuan Yew. According to Josey, it was because he put on the radio the strikers' arguments (strike in 1951) for the first time which infuriated the British colonial people, and amused Lee, which sparked their friendship.

In July 1952, Josey along with Dr Goh Keng Swee and Kenny Byrne formed the short-lived Council of Join Action.

By 1954, he had become a full-time Journalist for the Singapore Standard.

Singapore became part of Malaysia in 1963, and in 1965, Josey was served with a banishment order by the Malaysian Government for "interfering with the internal politics of Malaysia" and was told to leave Singapore by 19 July 1965. It was widely believed that the banishment was served because of his association with then Prime Minister of Singapore Lee Kuan Yew and his articles critical of the Malays and the Federal Government. He left Singapore on 20 July 'without undue fuss' and was credited as the first foreign correspondent to be expelled from either colonial Malaya or an independent democratic Malaysia. The expulsion was considered to be an attempt by extremists in the Alliance to slow down the Malaysian Malaysia movement, and an attack on the People's Action Party leaders.

Shortly after Singapore became independent from Malaysia on 9 August 1965, he returned to Singapore and gained employment as a ghostwriter and public relations officer to Lee Kwan Yew. At this time, Lee Kwan Yew became the Prime Minister of Republic of Singapore. He also kept up his journalism, writing extensively for The Bulletin, Sunday Citizen, New Statesman, Economist and Time magazines.

It was during this time he wrote what has been called the most comprehensive biography of Lee Kuan Yew (1968 and 1980) in two volumes which cover the 1959–1978 period.

In 1970, he became an office bearer of the Singapore Squash Rackets Association in its early years. In 1971 he is labelled as being the editor of the Asia Pacific Record.

By 1983, he had become the publication manager of the Singapore International Chamber of Commerce.

He was diagnosed with Parkinson's disease in 1976. By 1985, crippled by the disease, he planned to leave Singapore for England to live with his sister as his royalties barely covered his medical costs. He had to cancel his plans though as his brother had fallen ill and his sister "could not take on the additional burden."

Josey died on 15 October 1986, age 76 at Tan Tock Seng Hospital and his ashes are at Singapore Casket, 131 Lavender Street, Singapore.

== Other notables ==
Josey performed radio-based psychological warfare for Yugoslavs, against Turkey, and against Greece.

In 1965, S. Rajaratnam, the Minister for Culture, praised Josey in a speech, saying that he had helped to combat foreign anti-Malaysian propaganda through objective reporting. The speech was made at a farewell dinner for Josey.

== Awards ==
Order of Freedom (Cambodia); Order of Merit

== Resources ==
=== A Catalogue of the papers of Alexander Arthur Josey ===
The papers include his correspondence, scripts and broadcasts, research papers, his publications and articles, his personal papers about cycling, also advertisements and technical reports about cycling. Included too are the constitution, rules, agenda and reports of the Road Time Trials Council and its affiliated clubs, 1937–1943, papers of the British League of Racing Cyclists, 1943–1945; Road Racing Council, 1926–1937, and the Road Records Association, 1938–1942; the Women's Road Records Association, 1940, and the Bicycle Polo Association of Great Britain, 1933–1940. The archive contains records about racing events and cyclists, 1895–1942, and papers and publications of many cycling clubs, 1880–1947; catalogues of bicycles and of parts for them, 1897–1938, cycling articles, 1877–1940; press cuttings, scrapbooks, photographs, tours and guides, books and ephemera, 1880–1974. The Modern Records Centre, University of Warwick Library, UK

=== The Alex Josey Private Papers ===
The Alex Josey Private Papers consist of documents on Malaysian political parties, correspondences of the politicians, the Hock Lee Riots as well as papers on communist insurgency in Malaysia. The papers also include Josey's articles on Lee Kuan Yew, Malays, Lim Chin Siong and other political detainees. Institute of Southeast Asian Studies Library, Singapore

=== Archives Online Singapore ===
Access to Archives Online Singapore (a2O)

== Books published ==
- 1941: Accident (psychological thriller)
- 1954: Trade unionism in Malaya [7 editions published between 1954 and 1958 in English and Undetermined]
- 1957: Socialism in Asia [6 editions published in 1957 in English]
- 1968: Labour laws in a changing Singapore
- 1968: Lee Kuan Yew in London [2 editions published in 1968 in English]
- 1968: The crucial years ahead : Republic of Singapore general election 1968 [1 edition published in 1968 in English]
- 1969: Golf in Singapore
- 1969: Lee Kuan Yew and the Commonwealth [3 editions published in 1969 in English and Undetermined]
- 1970: Democracy in Singapore: The 1970 by elections [4 editions published in 1970 in English]
- 1970: Singapore panorama; 150 years in pictures. (Text by Alex Josey and Eric Jennings. Edited by Eric Jennings) [1 edition published in 1970 in English]
- 1971: Lee Kuan Yew [25 editions published between 1968 and 1984 in 4 languages]
- 1972: The Singapore general elections, 1972 [3 editions published in 1972 in English]
- 1973: Asia Pacific socialism [2 editions published in 1973 in English]
- 1973: The trial of Sunny Ang [4 editions published between 1973 and 1984 in English]
- 1974: Lee Kuan Yew: Struggle for Singapore [10 editions published between 1974 and 1981 in 3 languages]
- 1976: Industrial relations: Labour laws in a developing Singapore [1 edition published in 1976 in English]
- 1978: Personal opinion [3 editions published in 1978 in English and Undetermined]
- 1980: Lee Kuan Yew: The Crucial Years [4 editions published between 1980 and 1994 in English]
- 1980: Pulau Senang: The experiment that failed [3 editions published in 1980 in English]
- 1980: Singapore: Its Past, Present and Future [11 editions published between 1979 and 1980 in English and Undetermined]
- 1981: More personal opinions
- 1981: The David Marshall trials [12 editions published between 1981 and 2008 in English and Undetermined]
- 1981: The tenth man: Gold bar murders [3 editions published in 1981 in English]
- 1982: David Marshalls Political Interlude [1 edition published in 1982 in English]
- 2009: Bloodlust (reprint of The tenth man-gold bar murders first published in 1973; The murder of a beauty queen first published in 1984)
- 2009: Cold-blooded murders (reprint of The trial of Sunny Ang, and Pulau Senang-the experiment that failed.)
- 2009: True Singapore Crimes (book 1 and 2 – reprints of Pulau Senang: The experiment that failed and The Tenth Man Gold Bar Trials

== Books about Alex Josey ==
Safian, Mohd. (1965) Alex Josey: Wartawan. Singapura: Penerbitan Riwayah (Malay)
