= Murray Buttrose =

Australian colonial judge (1903–1987)

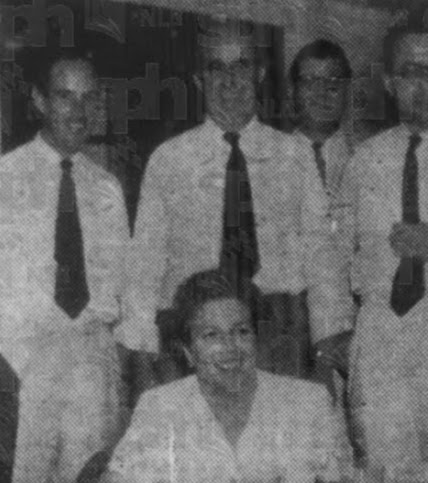
- Murray Buttrose (centre) and Mrs Buttrose in 1951
- Born: 31 July 1903; Australia
- Died: 8 September 1987 (aged 84); Adelaide
- Education: University of Adelaide
- Occupation: Colonial judge
- Years active: 1927–1977
- Children: 1 son

Murray Buttrose (31 July 1903 – 8 September 1987) was an Australian colonial judge who served as Solicitor General of Singapore.

== Early life and education ==
Buttrose was born on 31 July 1903 in Australia to William and Frances Buttrose, both British. He was educated at St Peter's College, Adelaide and the University of Adelaide in South Australia.

== Career ==
Buttrose was admitted and enrolled as a barrister and solicitor of the Supreme Court of South Australia in 1927. During the Second World War he served as wing-commander with the Royal Air Force (1940-45). In 1946, he joined the British Colonial Service as Crown Counsel in Supreme Court of Singapore and rose to Senior Crown Counsel in 1949. During the British Military Administration, he took a leading role as prosecutor in several Japanese collaboration cases. He served as a temporary member in the Legislative Council. In 1955, he was appointed Solicitor General, Singapore and from 1956 to 1968, served as a Puisne Judge and sat as a member of the Federal Court of Appeal.

Buttrose presided over some of the biggest criminal cases in Singapore. He was described by Singapore's ambassador to France: "As a prosecutor he was very tough and was a very tough judge, very strong on order, rather hard on criminals, but fair", and by senior local lawyers as: "Very sharp and very brisk...He liked lawyers to conduct their cases with speed and not waiver about".

Two of the most memorable cases held before him were the Pulau Senang Trial (1964) in which 60 detainees of a penal settlement were charged with three counts of murder and rioting, of which 18 were given death sentences and hanged, and the Sunny Ang Trial (1965) in which the accused was hanged for murder-at-sea of his girlfriend whose body was never found.

In 1959, he served as Chairman of the Commission of the Inquiry established to investigate Chew Swee Kee, a Singaporean politician and Minister of Education, accused of receiving foreign funds.

Buttrose was admitted as a solicitor in England in 1955. He served as a Recorder of the Crown Court from 1972 to 1974, and as a Deputy Circuit Judge from 1975 to 1977. He retired to Australia.

== Personal life and death ==
Buttrose married Jean Marie Bowering in 1935 and they had a son.

Buttrose died on 8 September 1987, aged 84.
