= Mitchell v DPP =

Judicial Committee of the Privy Council case

- Court: Judicial Committee of the Privy Council
- Full case name: Andy Mitchell and 18 Others, Appellants v The Director of Public Prosecutions and The Attorney General, Respondents
- Decided: 25 July 1985
- Citations: [1985] UKPC 27, 32 WIR 241

Case history
- Prior action: Court of Appeal of Grenada

Case opinions
- Lord Diplock

Keywords
- Judicial Committee of the Privy Council; appeals; abolition

Mitchell v DPP is a 1985 Judicial Committee of the Privy Council (JCPC) case in which it was reaffirmed that a Commonwealth state has the power to unilaterally abolish appeals to the JCPC.

Following the 1979 coup by the New Jewel Movement, the People's Revolutionary Government in Grenada (an independent Commonwealth member since 1974, previously an Associated State) enacted a law which abolished all appeals to the Privy Council, a process set out in the Constitution of Grenada. Following the U.S. invasion of Grenada and the overthrow of the revolutionary government, the Parliament of Grenada enacted a 1985 law which confirmed the 1979 act of abolition. Although the 1979 law may not have been constitutional (in that it purported to amend the constitution without enacting a law by a two-thirds parliamentary majority), the 1985 law was passed with a two-thirds majority and thus adhered to the procedure for amending the constitution. Thus, the JCPC held that appeals to it from Grenada had been legitimately abolished as of 21 February 1985.

Since Mitchell and the 18 other appellants had filed their appeal in July 1985, the JCPC was not entitled to hear their appeals.

In 1991, Grenada re-established appeals to the JCPC.
