= Bridlington Principles =

Agreements between UK trade unions

The Bridlington Principles are a set of rules aimed at resolving conflicts among trade unions in the United Kingdom. The principles form the Trades Union Congress (TUC) code of practice that unions in England and Wales must adhere to as a condition of continued affiliation.

First adopted in 1939 at the TUC's 1939 Congress meeting in Bridlington, the principles initially required that unions did not attempt to "poach" each other's members, in the interests of a cohesive, non-conflictual atmosphere of industrial relations.

In trade union branch meetings, membership applications from members of other unions are often "accepted subject to Bridlington".

The principles have been updated over time by TUC, and have been published in a booklet called TUC Disputes Principles and Procedures since 1976. In May 2000, an update took into account the then new statutory recognition scheme. In September 2007, TUC agreed to changes to Principle 3 recommended by the TUC Executive Committee in the Annual Report to Congress. References to situations where a union is currently engaged in organising activity were added. The most recent update to the booklet and principles was published in March 2019. This and the previous 2016 update "strengthened the provisions regarding union conduct towards sister organisations, and reinforced the responsibility of unions to positively engage when members transfer their employment," including provisions against undercutting sister unions' membership rates. The 2019 update also set out principles for joint working arrangements on industrial campaigns in multi-union environments.

The four principles cover:

1. Co-operation and the prevention of disputes
2. Membership
3. Organisation and recognition
4. Inter-union disputes and industrial action

== See also ==
- UK labour law
