= O'Reilly v Mackman =

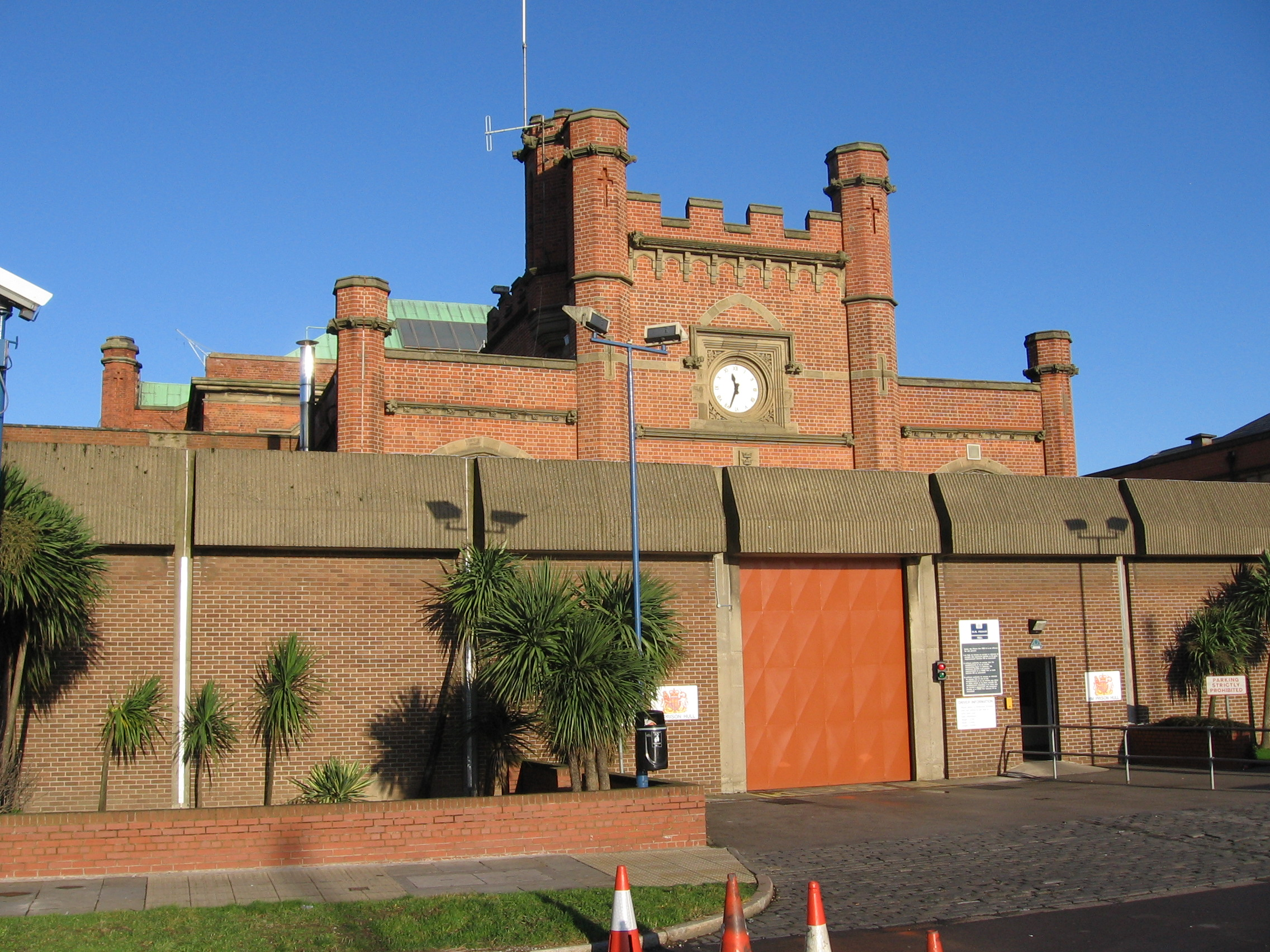
- HMP Hull
- Court: House of Lords
- Citations: [1983] UKHL 1, [1983] 2 AC 237

Keywords
- Judicial review

O'Reilly v Mackman [1983] UKHL 1 is a UK constitutional law case, concerning judicial review.

== Facts ==
Convicted prisoners claimed that a decision that they lost remission of their sentences, after a riot in Hull prison, was null and void because of breaches of natural justice, as seen in St Germain [1979] QB 425. The defendants applied to have the action struck out, arguing the decisions could only be challenged by applying for judicial review. There was a requirement to be prompt.

== Judgment ==
=== Court of Appeal ===
Lord Denning MR and the Court of Appeal held that it would be an abuse of process to allow a claim through judicial review.

In modern times we have come to recognise two separate fields of law: one of private law, the other of public law. Private law regulates the affairs of subjects as between themselves. Public law regulates the affairs of subjects vis-à-vis public authorities. For centuries there were special remedies available in public law. They were the prerogative writs of certiorari, mandamus and prohibition. As I have shown, they were taken in the name of the sovereign against a public authority which had failed to perform its duty to the public at large or had performed it wrongly. Any subject could complain to the sovereign: and then the King's courts, at their discretion, would give him leave to issue such one of the prerogative writs as was appropriate to meet his case. But these writs, as their names show, only gave the remedies of quashing, commanding or prohibiting. They did not enable a subject to recover damages against a public authority, nor a declaration, nor an injunction. This was such a defect in public law that the courts drew upon the remedies available in private law - so as to see that the subject secured justice. It was held that, if a public authority failed to do its duty and, in consequence, a member of the public suffered particular damage therefrom. he could sue for damages by an ordinary action in the courts of common law: see Lyme Regis Corporation v. Henley (1834) 8 Bli.N.S. 690 and Dorset Yacht Co Ltd v Home Office [1970] A.C. 1004 . Likewise, if a question arose as to the rights of a subject vis-à-vis the public authority, he could come to the courts and ask for a declaration (see Dyson v. Attorney-General [1911] 1 K.B. 410 and Pyx Granite Co. Ltd. v. Ministry of Housing and Local Government [1960] AC 260 ) or against a local authority: see Prescott v. Birmingham Corporation [1955] Ch. 210 and Meade v. Haringey London Borough Council [1979] 1 W.L.R. 637. And this remedy has been applied right up to the present time in ordinary actions brought without leave: see, for instance, Grunwick Processing Laboratories Ltd. v. Advisory, Conciliation and Arbitration Services [1978] A.C. 655 and Payne v. Lord Harris of Greenwich [1981] 1 W.L.R. 754.

=== House of Lords ===
The House of Lords held that the prisoners had to make a claim through judicial review, not for breach of statutory duty. The court had jurisdiction to grant the declarations, but the prisoners’ case was solely a claim based on public law. Order 53 (now CPR Part 54) protected public authorities from groundless or delayed attacks by its requirements, so it would be wrong to allow evasion of its limits. When public bodies make contracts, torts or have property disputes, they fall within ordinary ‘private’ law rules. Claims for JR may not be used instead.

Lord Diplock said the following:

[It would...] as a general rule be contrary to public policy, and as such an abuse of the process of the court, to permit a person seeking to establish that a decision of a public authority infringed rights to which he was entitled to protection under public law to proceed by way of ordinary authorities....

== See also ==
- United Kingdom constitutional law
