= Kenneth Diplock, Baron Diplock =

British senior Barrister and distinguished Appeal Judge

The Right Honourable The Lord Diplock PC

Lord of Appeal in Ordinary
- In office 30 September 1968 – 14 October 1985

Lord Justice of Appeal
- In office 1961 – 30 September 1968

Justice of the High Court
- In office 1956–1961

Personal details
- Born: William John Kenneth Diplock; 8 December 1907
- Died: 14 October 1985 (aged 77)

William John Kenneth Diplock, Baron Diplock, PC (8 December 1907 – 14 October 1985) was an English barrister and judge who served as a lord of appeal in ordinary between 1968 and until his death in 1985. Appointed to the High Court of Justice in 1956 and the Court of Appeal five years later, Diplock made important contributions to the development of constitutional and public law as well as many other legal fields. A frequent choice for governmental inquiries, he is also remembered for proposing the creation of the eponymous juryless Diplock courts. Of him, Lord Rawlinson of Ewell wrote that "to his generation Diplock was the quintessential man of the law".

== Early life and legal career ==
Kenneth Diplock was born in South Croydon, the son of solicitor William John Hubert Diplock and his wife Christine Joan (nee Brooke). He was educated at Whitgift School in Croydon and University College, Oxford, where he read chemistry, taking a Second in 1929. He was Secretary of the Oxford Union for a term in 1929. He later become an honorary fellow of University College in 1958.

Diplock was called to the bar by the Middle Temple in 1932. After two years in the chambers of Sir Valentine Holmes, KC, he transferred to the chambers of Sir Leslie Scott, KC. In 1939, he left legal practice for service in the Second World War; in 1941, he joined the Royal Air Force, in which he reached the rank of squadron leader. From 1939 to 1948, he was secretary to the Master of the Rolls, Lord Greene.

Returning to the bar in 1945, Diplock was made a King's Counsel in 1948, at the early age of 41. He acquired a large practice in commercial work and in advisory work for Commonwealth governments. He was Recorder of Oxford from 1951 to 1956, and served on the Law Reform Committee.

== Judicial career ==
In 1956, Diplock was appointed to the High Court, receiving the customary knighthood. Assigned to the Queen's Bench Division, he was appointed President of the Restrictive Practices Court in January 1961. He was promoted to Lord Justice of Appeal in October 1961, and was sworn of the Privy Council. He was chairman of the Security Commission from 1971 to 1982.

He became a Lord of Appeal in Ordinary on 30 September 1968 and was elevated as a life peer with the title Baron Diplock, of Wansford in the County of Huntingdon and Peterborough to the House of Lords.

He became the senior Law Lord upon the retirement of Lord Wilberforce in 1982. He resigned his seniority in October 1984 but remained a Law Lord until his death the following year.

As Lord Diplock, he chaired a commission set up in 1972 to consider legal measures against terrorism in Northern Ireland, which led to the establishment of the juryless Diplock courts with which his name is now often associated.

In September 1985, Lord Diplock sat as a judge for the last time, in a special sitting of the Judicial Committee of the Privy Council during the Long Vacation for an urgent civil case from Trinidad and Tobago. Severely ill from emphysema, Diplock came to court from the hospital in a wheelchair and with an oxygen cylinder.

At the time of his death, Lord Diplock was the longest serving law lord as well as the last serving superior judge to not be covered by the mandatory retirement age of 75 introduced by the Judicial Pensions Act 1959.

== Personal life ==
He married Margaret Sarah Atcheson in 1938; they had no children.

== Contributions to legal thought ==
He made many contributions to legal thought and pushed the law in new and unique directions, not least UK courts without juries ('Diplock courts'). His rulings, especially those on administrative law, are often considered as authoritative not only in England but across the Commonwealth and even in the United States, where he has been cited by the Second Circuit and Supreme Court.

Examples include Council of Civil Service Unions v Minister for the Civil Service [1984] UKHL 9 or R (National Federation of Self-Employed and Small Businesses Ltd) v Inland Revenue Commissioners [1982] AC 617, on grounds of review and locus standi respectively.

He also made important contributions to contract law.

The current typology of grounds for judicial review is owing to Lord Diplock.

- Procedural impropriety
- Nemo judex (Bias rule)
- Audi alteram partem (Hearing rule)
- Illegality
- Ultra vires
- Simple ultra vires
- Extended ultra vires
- Procedural ultra vires
- Fettering
- Irrationality
- Wednesbury irrationality
- Lack of proportionality
- Innominate Terms
- Primary and Secondary Obligations

== Notable judgments ==
=== High Court ===
- Silkin v Beaverbrook Newspapers Ltd [1958] 1 WLR 743

=== Court of Appeal ===
- Hong Kong Fir Shipping Co Ltd v Kawasaki Kisen Kaisha Ltd [1962] 2 QB 26
- Boulting v Association of Cinematograph, Television and Allied Technicians [1963] 2 QB 606
- BBC v Johns [1965] Ch 32
- Letang v Cooper [1965] 1 QB 232
- United Dominions Trust Ltd v Kirkwood [1966] 2 QB 431
- R v Mowatt [1968] 1 QB 421

=== House of Lords ===
- Pettitt v Pettitt [1970] AC 777
- Dorset Yacht Co Ltd v Home Office [1970] AC 1004
- Gissing v Gissing [1971] AC 886
- Re Vandervell Trustees Ltd [1971] AC 912
- American Cyanamid Co v Ethicon Ltd [1975] AC 396
- Ayerst (Inspector of Taxes) v C&K (Construction) Ltd [1976] AC 167
- Town Investments v Department of the Environment [1978] AC 359
- DPP v Stonehouse [1978] AC 55, 68
- Erven Warnink BV v J Townend & Sons (Hull) Ltd [1979] AC 731
- Gibson v Manchester City Council [1979] 1 WLR 294
- Whitehouse v Lemon; Whitehouse v Gay News Ltd [1979] AC 406, [1979] 2 WLR 281, [1979] 1 All ER 898
- IRC v Burmah Oil Co. Ltd 1982 SC (HL) 114
- Catnic Components Ltd v Hill & Smith Ltd [1982] RPC 183
- Universe Tankships Inc. of Monrovia v. International Transport Workers' Federation [1983] 1 AC 366
- R v Miller [1983] 2 AC 161
- Cheall v APEX [1983] 2 AC 180
- O'Reilly v Mackman [1983] 2 AC 237
- R v Sullivan [1984] AC 156
- Council of Civil Service Unions v Minister for the Civil Service [1985] AC 374
- Harvela Investments Ltd v Royal Trust of Canada (CI) Ltd [1986] AC 207
- R v Lawrence [1982] AC 510

=== Judicial Committee of the Privy Council ===
- Ong Ah Chuan v Public Prosecutor [1981] AC 648
- Mitchell v DPP [1986] AC 73
- Haw Tua Tau v. Public Prosecutor [1981] UKPC 23

== Arms ==
Coat of arms of Kenneth Diplock, Baron Diplock
Crest A demi horse Argent crined and unglued Or supporting a pair of keys interlaced at the bows wards downwards and outwards the dexter Argent the sinister Or. Escutcheon Gules a quintain Argent garnished and with a crossbeam and targe double chained towards the base and padlocked Or a border Ermine. Supporters On a compartment of ploughed land between pasture within a hedgerow interspersed with paling all Proper dexter a fox hound sinister a fox both Proper. Motto Celeriter Ac Diligenter (Latin for 'Quickly and Carefuly')

== See also ==
- Judicial review in English law
- Air New Zealand Flight 901
