= Sunny Ang =

Convicted murderer executed in Singapore

- Born: c. 1939; Singapore, Straits Settlements
- Died: 6 February 1967 (aged 27–28); Changi Prison, Singapore
- Cause of death: Execution by hanging
- Other names: Anthony Ang; Ang Soo Suan
- Status: Executed on 6 February 1967
- Conviction: Murder (1 count)
- Penalty: Death

Details
- Victims: 1
- Date: 27 August 1963
- Country: Singapore
- Date apprehended: 21 December 1964

Sunny Ang (c. 1939 – 6 February 1967), also known as Ang Soo Suan, (Note: (Chinese: 洪书宣; pinyin: Hóng Shūxuān) The Chinese name for Ang is not confirmed, as "洪书宣" is noted to be transliterated from contemporary newspaper articles.) was a Singaporean racing driver and part-time law student who gained notoriety for the murder of his girlfriend Jenny Cheok Cheng Kid near Sisters' Islands. Ang was charged and tried for murder in the High Court of Singapore solely based on circumstantial evidence and without a body. His case attracted substantial attention in Singapore and Malaysia given that he was the first to be tried for murder without a body in these two countries.

On 19 May 1965, Ang was found guilty of murder by a unanimous decision in one of Singapore's last jury trials before its abolition in January 1970. The jury recommended the mandatory death sentence, which the High Court imposed on Ang. His case became a landmark in both Singapore and Malaysia as he was the first to be found guilty of murder and undergo capital punishment solely based on circumstantial evidence and the first to be convicted and sentenced to death for murder without a body. Ang lost his appeals against the sentence and he was eventually executed on 6 February 1967. Cheok's body was never found.

== Early life ==
Ang was born in 1939, one of the children in a middle-class family in the British Colony of Singapore.

Ang was English-educated, and he started school very young. With an IQ of 128, Ang was shown to be extremely intelligent and was always among the top 10 in school. He also had a hobby of reading books. Ang completed his secondary school education at Victoria School in 1955, and he obtained his Senior Cambridge (today's GCE O-levels) Grade One certificate in the following year. He was trained to be a teacher in 1957, but he later gave up and underwent training as a pilot under a government scholarship. However, he was sacked as he repeatedly ignored safety regulations. Ang began his career as a one-time Grand Prix driver by participating in the 1961 Singapore Grand Prix – a tourism event at the Old Thomson Road circuit.

Ang ran afoul of the law twice during this period. He was first charged and convicted of negligent driving after he killed a pedestrian during an accident in 1961, and was issued a fine. In 1962, Ang was arrested and sentenced to probation for attempting to commit burglary. After this second conviction, Ang decided to study law part-time and wanted to go to England to obtain a law degree, but he became bankrupt in 1962 due to his lavish lifestyle.

Ang had once resorted to stealing his father's money, which amounted to $7,000, and fabricated it so that someone else was held responsible. Later, when the truth was exposed, his father drove him out of the house. It was only because of Ang's mother, Madam Yeo Bee Na, who reportedly always pampered her son, that Ang was allowed back home. David Saul Marshall, a lawyer who once defended Ang when he was accused of theft, had once expressed that during his years as a lawyer, he never met someone as arrogant and unrepentant as Ang, and felt regret for helping him escape the theft charge.

== Relationship with Jenny Cheok ==
In May 1963, at Odeon Bar and Restaurant at North Bridge Road, Ang, then 24, met Jenny Cheok Cheng Kid (石清菊; shí qīngjǘ), a 22-year-old bar waitress who worked in the restaurant.

Jenny Cheok, birth name Cheok Cheng Kid, was born in 1941. Her father died when she was young, and her mother later married Toh Kim Seng and had another daughter, Irene Toh, in 1947; reportedly, Cheok was close to her half-sister. Cheok spoke little English as she had only attended three years of elementary school before dropping out. In 1957, Cheok married a man named Yui Chin Chuan by Chinese practices, and had a son and daughter with him. A few years later, Cheok became estranged from her husband. By the time she met Ang, Cheok was already separated from Yui, who took custody of their two children.

From the time they first met, Cheok and Ang slowly developed a close, romantic relationship that surpassed that of friends. Due to Ang's charming nature, his education, and his intelligence, Cheok became completely attracted to him; he often flattered her with close attention. They were only in a relationship for a short time before Cheok was convinced that she wanted to marry Ang, a wish that Ang shared. He sometimes gave her swimming and scuba-diving lessons.

== Disappearance of Jenny Cheok ==
Jenny Cheok Cheng Kid
- Born: Cheok Cheng Kid c. 1941; Singapore, Straits Settlements
- Died: 27 August 1963 (aged 21–22); Sisters' Islands, Singapore
- Cause of death: Murder
- Resting place: Between the Indian Ocean and the South China Sea – body never found
- Other name: Jenny Cheok
- Education: Primary 3 (drop-out)
- Occupation: Bar waitress
- Known for: Murder victim
- Spouse: Yui Chin Chuan (m. 1957; divorced)
- Children: A son and daughter

On 27 August 1963, Ang and Cheok hired a boatman, Yusuf bin Ahmad, to take them to Sisters' Islands, where they planned to go scuba diving and collect corals. Ang brought along a guide rope, three air tanks, two pairs of fins, two knives, a small axe, aqualung equipment, and a transistor radio. The waters around Sisters' Islands were known to be dangerous and deep.

Thirty minutes later, when they reached Sisters' Islands, after putting on her dive belt and taking the axe, a knife, and a metal weight, Cheok went into the water alone for the first time. Ang tied a rope around her to guide her. According to Yusuf, who had once taken the couple to another diving trip, Cheok was not a skilled diver. Yusuf saw Ang diving and Cheok swimming. Ten minutes later, Cheok resurfaced.

After Cheok resurfaced, Ang changed his girlfriend's air tank for her, and allowed her to dive by herself again. This time, Ang did not dive in with her even though he was in his swimming trunks. Later, after testing his air tank, Ang asked for help from Yusuf, saying that his air tank was leaking, and the washer had a problem. Lending a helping hand, the boatman helped Ang to improvise one, but it still failed to work. All the time Ang and Yusuf were repairing the air tank, Cheok was still underwater.

It was only then that Ang tugged on the rope and found that Cheok was missing. He asked Yusuf where his girlfriend was but Yusuf said he did not see her. Ang repeatedly tugged the rope again, but to no avail. Yusuf then took the boat to St John's Island to contact the police. Ang approached Jaffar bin Hussein, a guard from the island along with five or six other fishermen, who went into the waters around Sisters' Islands to search for Cheok, but this proved futile. According to Yusuf, he and Ang did not go overboard to find Cheok before seeking help. Ang did not go into the water to search for Cheok even though they had sought help from the fishermen, and Yusuf claimed that Ang seemed calm and not anxious, which was strange when he, as Cheok's boyfriend, was supposed to be extremely worried about his girlfriend's safety.

Police were later contacted and on the sixth day after Cheok's disappearance, several frogmen from the British Royal Navy and the Royal Air Force's Changi Sub-Aqua Club went underwater to search for Cheok's body, but it was never found. The frogmen only found a flipper, which belonged to Cheok and was worn by her before she went missing. The flipper was found to be severed cleanly at the top and bottom, possibly by a sharp instrument such as a knife or razor blade. An expert witness later testified that the loss of a flipper would have resulted in a diver's loss of equilibrium and affected the person's mobility. Since Jenny Cheok was inexperienced in swimming and diving, she might have panicked and got swept away and drowned in the strong ocean currents around the islands.

== Murder charge and trial ==
=== Investigations and indictment ===
Police investigations began the moment 22-year-old Jenny Cheok went missing. Immediately, Ang became a suspect in the case.

The police found that less than 24 hours after Cheok went missing, Ang had notified several insurance companies that Cheok was dead and demanded compensation. Ang even tried to look for lawyers to rush the coroner's report about whether Cheok was dead or not. This aroused the suspicion of the police since it was not even concluded that the missing Cheok was dead when Ang went to demand the companies to issue the payouts. As he was an experienced diver, he stood to gain from the payouts of the insurance policies he may have bought for Cheok. The police then decided to re-classify Cheok's disappearance as murder (under the pretext of investigation purposes) on 6 September 1963, and started their formal investigations.

On 21 December 1964, police arrested Ang, and brought him to court to face a murder charge the next day. Ang was initially discharged (but not acquitted) of the murder charge on 29 December 1964, as the judge did not accept the prosecution's request for more time to prepare their case. However, the police re-arrested him again an hour later, and detained him for a day before charging him with murder a second time. This time, the magistrate approved some time for the prosecution to build their case given that it involved a possible, but serious, offence of murder, and ordered Ang to be remanded at Outram Prison (defunct since 1973) to await trial.

=== Trial ===
On 26 April 1965, Ang stood trial for murder in the High Court before a seven-men jury; High Court judge Murray Buttrose presided over the trial. Senior Crown Counsel Francis T. Seow led the prosecution, and lawyer Punch Coomaraswamy was hired to represent Ang. Since the crime of murder was a capital offence in Singapore (inherited from the laws of British colonial rule), Ang faced mandatory capital punishment should the jury find him guilty, either by a majority or unanimous decision under the law of Singapore (before the country's abolition of jury trials in 1970).

The trial attracted much public attention due to the unusual case of a person charged for murder without a body. The prosecution's case was based entirely on circumstantial evidence. Seow, in his opening statement, described the case in the trial as "an unusual case insofar as Singapore, or for that matter Malaysia, is concerned. This is the first case of its kind to be tried in our courts that there is no body." However, Seow did not mince words when he stated that even if a body was not present, it did not mean that anyone would escape a murder charge as it would have meant that some despicable killers might go free and escape punishment from the law. The lack of a body only meant that the prosecution had a higher burden of proof when prosecuting a person for murder. It was rumoured that Ang's father, who worked as a civil servant, had unsuccessfully tried to plead to Seow in private on his son's behalf.

In the trial, it was revealed that before her disappearance, Ang had helped Cheok to purchase several insurance policies, and stated that these payouts would be given to her estate or his mother, who would become Cheok's mother-in-law once they became married. He also helped Cheok to find a lawyer to set a will that when she died, her estate would be given to Ang's mother. Cheok's and Ang's mothers had never met one another. These insurance policies had a total coverage of $450,000 for Cheok. One of the insurance policies had expired the day before Cheok went missing, but Ang had extended it for five days just three hours before the diving trip. These policies were purchased under the claims that Cheok was an heiress of a chicken farm. Cheok, who only earned about $90 per month and had resigned from her job a month before her disappearance, had little money to pay the premiums for her insurance policies. The prosecution alleged that due to his undischarged bankruptcy, Ang needed money and thus had a motive to help Cheok buy the insurance, and later solicited her alleged murder. Yusuf bin Ahmad, the boatman who accompanied Ang and Cheok in their trip to Sisters' Islands, became the prosecution's key witness and testified about Ang's demeanour in the course of the search for his missing girlfriend.

The trial also revealed a possible attempted murder made by Ang on Cheok's life. Ang had once driven a car in Malaysia, returning from a holiday trip with Cheok in Kuala Lumpur, but they had an accident, in which the passenger side was severely damaged. Cheok managed to escape with only a few injuries. Ang, skilled enough to take part in a Grand Prix, said it was because he was trying to avoid a dog. Before the couple's return trip, Ang took out two accident policies — $30,000 for himself and $100,000 for his girlfriend.

Ang later elected to go on the stand to give his defence. Ang argued that he was innocent, stating that Cheok was the woman he loved and intended to marry. When he was asked why he did not go into the water to look for Cheok, Ang only said that Cheok might have been attacked by sharks, and said that the fishermen who dived in were more experienced. Ang claimed that he let Cheok go into the water first out of the basic courtesy of "ladies first". Ang also claimed that Cheok had made good progress in learning how to swim and scuba dive, which was in contrast to the many witnesses' testimonies about Cheok's lack of experience and skills. He said he put his mother's name on the beneficiaries' list for the insurance policies to avoid arousing suspicion should anything happen to Cheok. Ang also denied that he had a motive to murder Cheok.

=== Verdict ===
Near the end of the trial on 19 May 1965, Justice Buttrose summed up the case for the jury to consider. He stated a total of 16 crucial points of circumstantial evidence that would prove Ang guilty of murder. Two hours later, the jury unanimously found Ang guilty of murder, and recommended the mandatory death sentence. Justice Buttrose excoriated Ang in court for the crime:

You have killed this young girl Jenny, whose only fault apparently was that she had the misfortune to fall in love with you, and to give you everything she possessed: her all. You killed her for personal gain. It is a crime cunningly contrived to give the appearance of an accident, and it was carried out with consummate coolness and nerve. At long last, the time has come for you to pay the penalty for your dreadful deed.

Shortly after, Ang was sentenced to death by hanging. While he remained emotionless, his sister, Juliet Ang, a law student, broke down and wept. He was sent to death row at Changi Prison.

Three months after Ang's conviction, Singapore became independent from Malaysia on 9 August 1965. Ang's trial was one of the last jury trials in Singapore, as the nation fully abolished the jury system in January 1970, allowing only bench trials in all criminal and civil cases.

== Execution ==
After he was sentenced to death, Ang filed an appeal to the Federal Court of Malaysia against his sentence, as the High Court initially remained subordinate to the Federal Court until 1969 despite Singapore's independence. In his appeal, Ang cited a miscarriage of justice in his case among the 18 grounds of appeal. These allegations were mostly directed at the trial judge Murray Buttrose, whom he alleged had prejudiced his case in a way that denied him a fair trial. However, on 19 November 1965, the Federal Court decided that the evidence, including Ang's true motive behind the murder of Jenny Cheok, was overpowering enough to prove Ang guilty and dismissed his appeal.

On 5 October 1966, Ang's appeal to the Privy Council in London was also rejected. Ang, who was then detained on death row in Changi Prison, made one final attempt to escape the gallows by appealing to President of Singapore Yusof Ishak for clemency. Ang's 3,000 family members, friends and sympathisers also sent another clemency petition to the president to plead for mercy. If successful, Ang's death sentence would be commuted to life imprisonment. However, on 31 January 1967, the president refused to grant Ang clemency and rejected both his petitions. Yusof later authorized the execution to be carried out on the Monday morning of 6 February 1967.

During his time on death row, Ang was initially remorseless over the murder of his girlfriend, and he was certain that he would not be hanged even after the High Court passed its judgement on him. It was only when he received news that the Privy Council rejected his appeal, that Ang slowly began to resign to his fate. He broke down in front of his estranged father, as he felt guilt for his misguided youth, during a prison visit in late 1966. Three days before his execution, Ang, who was an atheist, converted to Christianity and began to seek forgiveness from God for his crime. He also expressed his regret to his family in his will, made before his hanging.

On 6 February 1967, 28-year-old Ang was hanged at dawn. His sister, Juliet Ang, who was called to the bar not long ago, waited outside Changi Prison to claim her brother's body, which was later buried in Bidadari Cemetery. Ang's father died in 1986. Ang's case was one of the famous cases prosecuted by Francis Seow, who died in 2016. The corpse of Jenny Cheok was never found. It was presumably lost at sea.

== Similar cases from Singapore and Malaysia ==
For decades, Ang's case remained as a landmark in both Singapore and Malaysia as he was the first murderer to be convicted and sentenced to death solely based on circumstantial evidence and the first to be convicted of murder without a body. Due to its significance, Ang's case was recalled 54 years later when another murderer named Leslie Khoo Kwee Hock was convicted of his lover Cui Yajie's murder without her body on 12 July 2019, making it the second case of a murder conviction without a body. Khoo was said to have started the affair with Cui in 2015 despite having a wife and son, and he also lied to Cui that he was divorced. The murder was due to Cui having argued with Khoo over personal issues before Khoo strangled her in the heat of the moment. While Ang was executed in 1967 for Cheok's murder, Khoo was sentenced to life imprisonment by the High Court on 19 August 2019, as he was found to have no intention to cause her death and did not display viciousness or a blatant disregard for human life. Having burnt her body into ashes after killing her during an argument near Gardens by the Bay, the fatal injuries sustained by the victim and their nature could not be ascertained to enable the court to determine if the death penalty was more appropriate in Khoo's case. Currently, Khoo is incarcerated at Changi Prison, where he is serving his life sentence since 2016.

Another case that recalled the trial of Ang was the alleged murder of Ayakannu Marithamuthu, which was reported as the "curry murder" case in 1987. Ayakannu was said to have gone missing on 12 December 1984, but in March 1987, following a tip-off, the police arrested at least four suspects (including Ayakannu's wife), and charged them with murder. One of the suspects allegedly confessed that Ayakannu, who often got violent when drunk and abused his wife, was murdered and his body chopped up before being cooked in curry and rice. The suspects had allegedly packed him in plastic bags and disposed of them in the roadside dustbins all over Singapore, which made headlines in Singapore, as well as making it one of the most notorious murders without a body. However, on the first day of the trial, the prosecutors admitted that the evidence was insufficient and the judge in charge of the case released the suspects after granting them a discharge not amounting to an acquittal. The case remains unsolved.

Ang's case was recalled in another alleged murder case from Singapore in 1989. In this case, a school bus driver named Oh Laye Koh was charged with the murder of Liang Shan Shan, a 17-year-old student from Mayflower Secondary School. Liang, a Malaysian from Sabah, went missing on 2 October 1989, and her highly decomposed body was found two weeks later in Yishun Industrial Park by National Servicemen who were training near the area. Forensic pathologist Chao Tzee Cheng could not ascertain the cause of death; he could not tell whether it was a suicide, murder or accident due to the state of decomposition. Some body parts were missing and the injuries he found on the skull and ribs were not sufficient to cause death. Later police investigations revealed that Liang was last seen boarding Oh's school bus at around 1 pm by her classmate, and Oh was later charged with murder. Oh was initially acquitted in 1992, but he was brought back to court in 1994 for a re-trial after the prosecution appealed the acquittal. When he was told to enter his defence, Oh chose to remain silent. From his decision to remain silent, his failure to submit additional evidence in his favour, as well as the circumstantial evidence pointing to Oh's possible guilt, the High Court made an inference that Oh had indeed killed Liang and her death was not suicidal or accidental, and thus sentenced Oh to death after finding him guilty of murder. Oh Laye Koh was executed together with two drug traffickers on 19 May 1995. Oh's lawyer Peter Fernando stated that Oh Laye Koh did not show remorse for his actions and continued to deny his crime till the end.

In Malaysia, lawyer N. Pathmanabhan and his two farm hands – T. Thilaiyalagan and R. Kathavarayan – were accused of murdering millionaire Datuk Sosilawati Lawiya and her three companions - bank officer Noohisham Mohamed, lawyer Ahmad Kamil Abdul Karim, and her driver Kamaruddin Shamsuddin – in 2010, purely based on circumstantial evidence and without the bodies of the victims. All three accused, who burnt the bodies before their arrests, were found guilty of murder and sentenced to death. Their death sentences were finalized and upheld by the Federal Court of Malaysia in March 2017. Ang's case was recalled in news reports covering the millionaire's murder.

== In popular media ==
- Less than ten years after the murder of Cheok at Sisters' Islands, British journalist Alex Josey wrote a book about the case of Ang, titled The "Perfect" Murder: The Trial of Sunny Ang. It was first published in 1973.
- In July 2015, nearly 52 years after the murder of Cheok, Singapore's national daily newspaper The Straits Times published an e-book titled Guilty As Charged: 25 Crimes That Have Shaken Singapore Since 1965, which included Ang's case as one of the top 25 crimes that shocked the nation since its independence in 1965. The book was borne out of collaboration between the Singapore Police Force and the newspaper. The e-book was edited by ST News Associate editor Abdul Hafiz bin Abdul Samad. The paperback edition of the book was published and first hit bookshelves in June 2017. The paperback edition first entered the ST bestseller list on 8 August 2017, a month after publication.
- The murder case of Cheok was re-enacted in Singaporean crime show True Files. It first aired as the seventh episode of the show's first season on 6 June 2002, nearly 39 years after the murder.
- In 1979, Taiwanese film production company Harvesters Film Distribution and Production revealed their plans to adapt Ang's case into a film; the names of those involved would be omitted.
- Another Singaporean crime show in 2022, titled Inside Crime Scene, also recounted the Ang murder trial and aired the on-screen adaptation as its fourth and penultimate episode.

== See also ==
- Capital punishment in Singapore
- Capital punishment in Malaysia
- List of major crimes in Singapore
- Murder conviction without a body
- List of murder convictions without a body
