= British administrative law =

Part of UK constitutional law

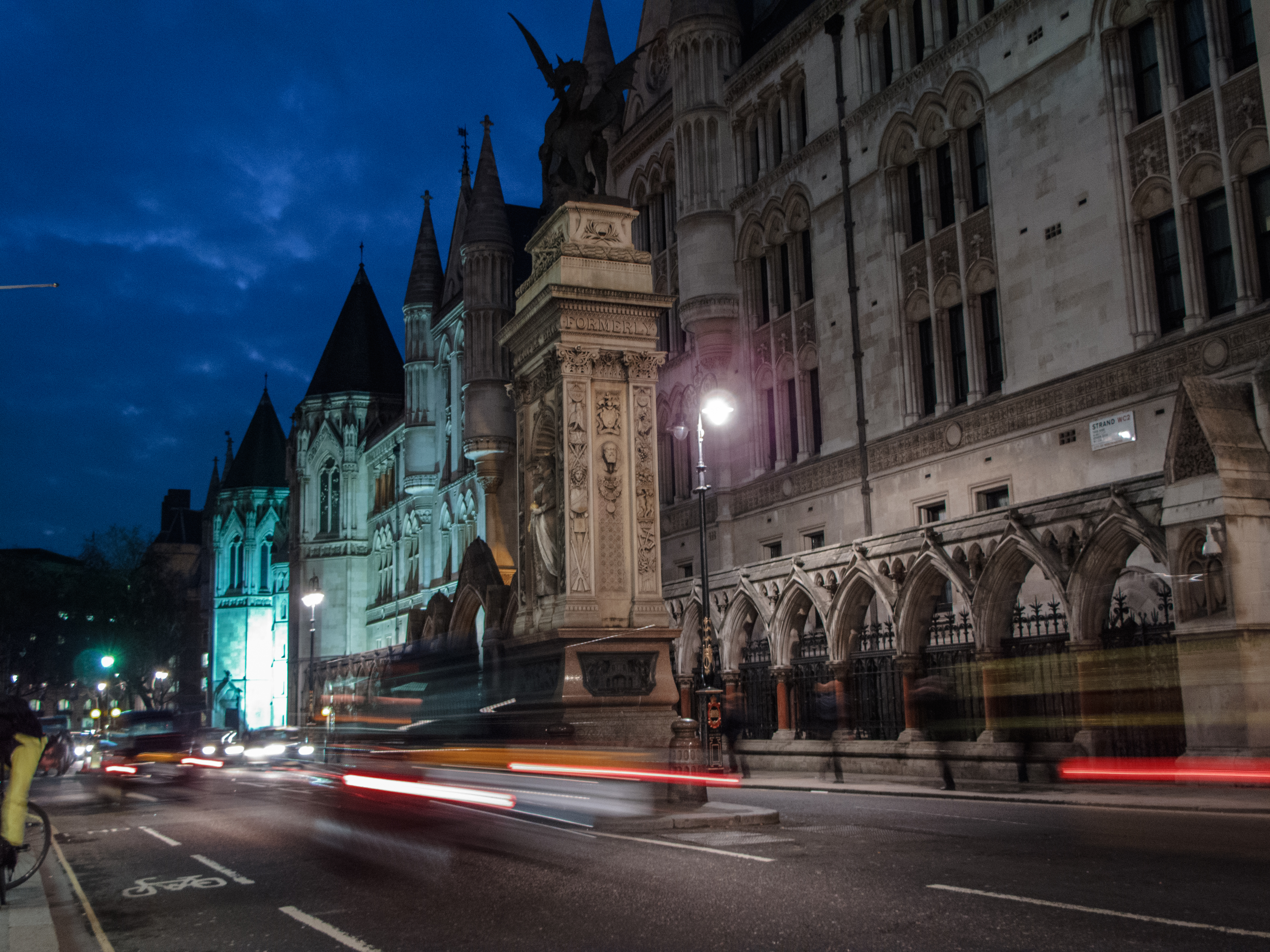
Any person in the UK who is significantly affected by a public body's act can challenge a decision by judicial review. The claims usually begin in the High Court.

British administrative law is part of UK constitutional law that is designed through judicial review to hold executive power and public bodies accountable under the law. A person can apply to the High Court to challenge a public body's decision if they have a "sufficient interest", within three months of the grounds of the cause of action becoming known. By contrast, claims against public bodies in tort or contract are usually limited by the Limitation Act 1980 to a period of 6 years.

Almost any public body, or private bodies exercising public functions, can be the target of judicial review, including a government department, a local council, any Minister, the Prime Minister, or any other body that is created by law. The only public body whose decisions cannot be reviewed is Parliament, when it passes an Act.

Otherwise, a claimant can argue that a public body's decision was unlawful in five main types of case: (1) it exceeded the lawful power of the body, used its power for an improper purpose, or acted unreasonably, (2) it violated a legitimate expectation, (3) failed to exercise relevant and independent judgement, (4) exhibited bias or a conflict of interest, or failed to give a fair hearing, and (5) violated a human right.

As a remedy, a claimant can ask for the public body's decisions to be declared void and quashed (or certiorari), or it could ask for an order to make the body do something (or mandamus), or prevent the body from acting unlawfully (or prohibition). A court may also declare the parties' rights and duties, give an injunction, or compensation could also be payable in tort or contract.

== History ==
- R v Glamorganshire Inhabitants (1700) 1 Ld Raym 580, review of rates levied by county justices to pay for bridge repairs
- Local authorities
- Poor Law guardians, public health boards, School Boards
- Indian Councils Act 1909
- Board of Education v Rice [1911] AC 179
- Local Government Board v Arlidge [1915] AC 120
- Moss Empires Ltd v Glasgow Assessor 1917 SC (HL)
- (1927) Cmd 2842
- Ridge v Baldwin [1964] AC 40, 72, Lord Reid, "We do not have a developed system of administrative law – perhaps because until fairly recently we did not need it".
- Re Racal Communications Ltd [1981] AC 374, 382, Lord Diplock, the creation of "a rational and comprehensive system of administrative law" was "the greatest achievement of the English courts" in his judicial career.
- R. v. North and East Devon Health Authority [1999], held that a disabled woman told by a health authority she would have a "home for life" in a facility had a substantive legitimate expectation the authority would not shut it down.
- Sir Robin Cooke, quoted in R (Baker) v Devon CC [1995] 1 All ER 73, 88, an "administrator must act fairly, reasonably and according to the law. That is the essence and the rest is mainly machinery."

== Delegated legislation ==
- Statutory Instrument
- Henry VIII clause

== Substantive judicial review ==
Applications for judicial review are generally divided into claims about the 'substance' of a public body's decision, and claims about the 'procedure' of a decision, although the two overlap, and there is not yet a codified set of grounds as is found in other countries or in other fields of law. First, a claimant may allege that a public body's decision was outside the 'letter and spirit of the law': that an act was ultra vires or did not follow the 'proper purpose' for which the public body's powers were conferred. For example, in R (McCarthy and Stone Ltd) v Richmond Council the House of Lords held that Richmond Council had no statutory power to charge residents a £25 fee to consult its planning officers, because deciding planning permission was a statutory duty, and no charge can be levied by a public body without clear statutory authority.

Similarly, in Hazell v Hammersmith and Fulham LBC the House of Lords held that the council acted beyond its powers in the Local Government Act 1972 by entering interest rate swaps transactions, a functional equivalent of borrowing money, which was limited by statute. The courts particularly guard against the executive's attempt to overreach its power. In Ahmed v HM Treasury the Supreme Court held that the United Nations Act 1946 section 1 did not confer on the Prime Minister the right to pass two orders that froze or seized funds of people designed by the UN Security Council as suspected terrorists without any possibility for review. The Act could not have left the definition of what was 'necessary' or 'expedient' to the uncontrolled judgement of the Prime Minister, which affected the rights of citizens without the clear authority of Parliament.

A public body may also act unlawfully by misinterpreting its own powers. In Anisminic Ltd v Foreign Compensation Commission the House of Lords held that the Foreign Compensation Commission, a body to compensate British persons who lost property when Gamal Abdel Nasser nationalised the Suez Canal during the Suez crisis of 1956, made an error of law by interpreting its powers narrowly. The FCC thought an Order in Council about its powers, which excluded claims by anyone whose 'successor in title' was not a British company, applied to Anisminic Ltd, whose assets were acquired by an Egyptian company after 1956. But the House of Lords held that the Egyptian company was not Anisminic Ltd's 'successor' in title, that the FCC had therefore taken an irrelevant factor into account (its own error of law) in denying a claim, and that the decision had to be a nullity. It was also not possible for an ouster clause in the Act, saying nothing should question the FCC's decisions, to prevent judicial review.

Determining the legality of a public body's action also extends to the purpose and therefore the policy objectives behind the legislation. In Padfield v Minister of Agriculture milk producers successfully argued that the Minister for Agriculture had wrongly exercised his power in the Agricultural Marketing Act 1958 section 19 by not raising subsidies for milk when transport costs changed. The country was divided into eleven milk regions, with different milk prices based on estimates of how much it cost to transport milk. The House of Lords held the Minister was wrong to refuse an investigation into milk price disparities because this frustrated a central policy of the Act: to ensure fair milk subsidies were paid, taking into account costs of production.

If public bodies take into account factors outside those necessary for exercising their judgement, a decision will also be quashed. So in R v Home Secretary ex parte Venables and Thompson the House of Lords held that the Home Secretary Michael Howard unlawfully took into account the irrelevant consideration of a petition organised by The Sun newspaper to not allow two men release from prison. Instead he should have taken into account the prisoners' progress during detention.

In the best known case, Associated Provincial Picture Houses v Wednesbury Corporation, a cinema claimed that the council's requirement that it stop admitting children aged under 15 on Sundays after a local poll was unreasonable. The Court of Appeal in 1948 held that this was not an unreasonable, irrational or absurd condition and therefore lawful. Lord Greene MR said that the different grounds of judicial review, including an error of law, regarding only relevant considerations, and absurd decisions, all 'run into one another', but that as a general concept a decision would only be unlawful if 'no sensible person could ever dream that it lay within the powers of the authority'.

One established ground by which decisions will automatically be unreasonable is if they have a discriminatory impact, violating the principle of equality. In Kruse v Johnson, Lord Russell CJ held that if a public body's actions 'were found to be partial and unequal in their operation as between different classes' it would be unreasonable and ultra vires. However, this test of "Wednesbury unreasonableness" has been repeatedly criticised as having little principled meaning, unless it is coupled with the purpose or policy of the law. The 'proportionality' test has been increasingly favoured, and sometimes said to reach similar outcomes. The proportionality test asks whether a public body's act has a legitimate aim, and then is appropriate, necessary, and reasonably balances individual and social interests, in achieving that aim. This test is routinely used in human rights, discrimination law, and trade law reasoning.

The second major group of cases concern claims that a public body defeated an applicant's 'legitimate expectations'. This is similar to a contract (without the need for consideration) or estoppel, so that if a public body promises or assures somebody something, but does not deliver, they will be able to claim a 'legitimate expectation' was defeated. For example in R v North and East Devon Health Authority, ex p Coughlan, Miss Coughlan claimed that she should be able to remain in social housing, a care home for people with severe disabilities after the health authority had assured her it was a 'home for life'. Coughlan had become tetraplegic after a severe road accident. The Court of Appeal held that it would be an abuse of power, breaking the assurance was 'equivalent to a breach of contract in private law', and it 'was unfair because it frustrated her legitimate expectation of having a home for life'.

By contrast, in Council of Civil Service Unions v Minister for the Civil Service the House of Lords held that the trade union at GCHQ had been given the assurance through the 'existence of a regular practice' that the employer would negotiate over a fair pay scale. However, Margaret Thatcher's decision to stop negotiation through an Order in Council on pay was justified (ostensibly) on grounds of 'national security'. On this point, and while the prerogative was also subject to judicial review, security was 'par excellence a non-justiciable question', their Lordships saying they were 'totally inept to deal with the sort of problems which it involves.' This has been criticised on the basis that the courts should have required reasons as to why workers bargaining for fair pay threatened national security.

A third group of cases concern a failure of a public body to exercise independent judgement, for instance by fettering their discretion. In British Oxygen Co Ltd v Minister of Technology the Minister had a rule in handing out capital grants to firms that it would not fund claims under £25. An oxygen cylinder company claimed it should receive the grants it has spent £4m on gas cylinders: they unfortunately just cost £20 each. The House of Lords held that while a government department was entitled to make a rule or policy in exercising its discretion, it must be 'always willing to listen to anyone with something new to say' and to make an exception, a principle akin to equity (mitigating strict legal rules) in administrative law.

== Procedural review ==
As well as reviewing the substance of a decision, judicial review has developed to ensure that public bodies follow lawful and just procedures in making all decisions. First, like the substance of a decision may go beyond the powers of a public body, a procedure actually followed by a public official may not follow what was required by law. In Ridge v Baldwin a chief constable was summarily dismissed by a Brighton police committee, even though the disciplinary regulations made under the Police Act 1919 required an inquiry into charges against someone before they were dismissed. The House of Lords held the regulations applied, and should have been followed, so the dismissal was ultra vires.

Basic principles of natural justice required that the constable should have had a hearing before being dismissed. According to Lord Hodson, the ‘irreducible minimum’ of natural justice is (1) the right to decision by an unbiased tribunal, (2) notice of any charges, and (3) a right to be heard. The same principles with regard to dismissal have been applied to a wide range of public servants, while the law of unfair dismissal and the common law quickly developed to protect the same right to job security.

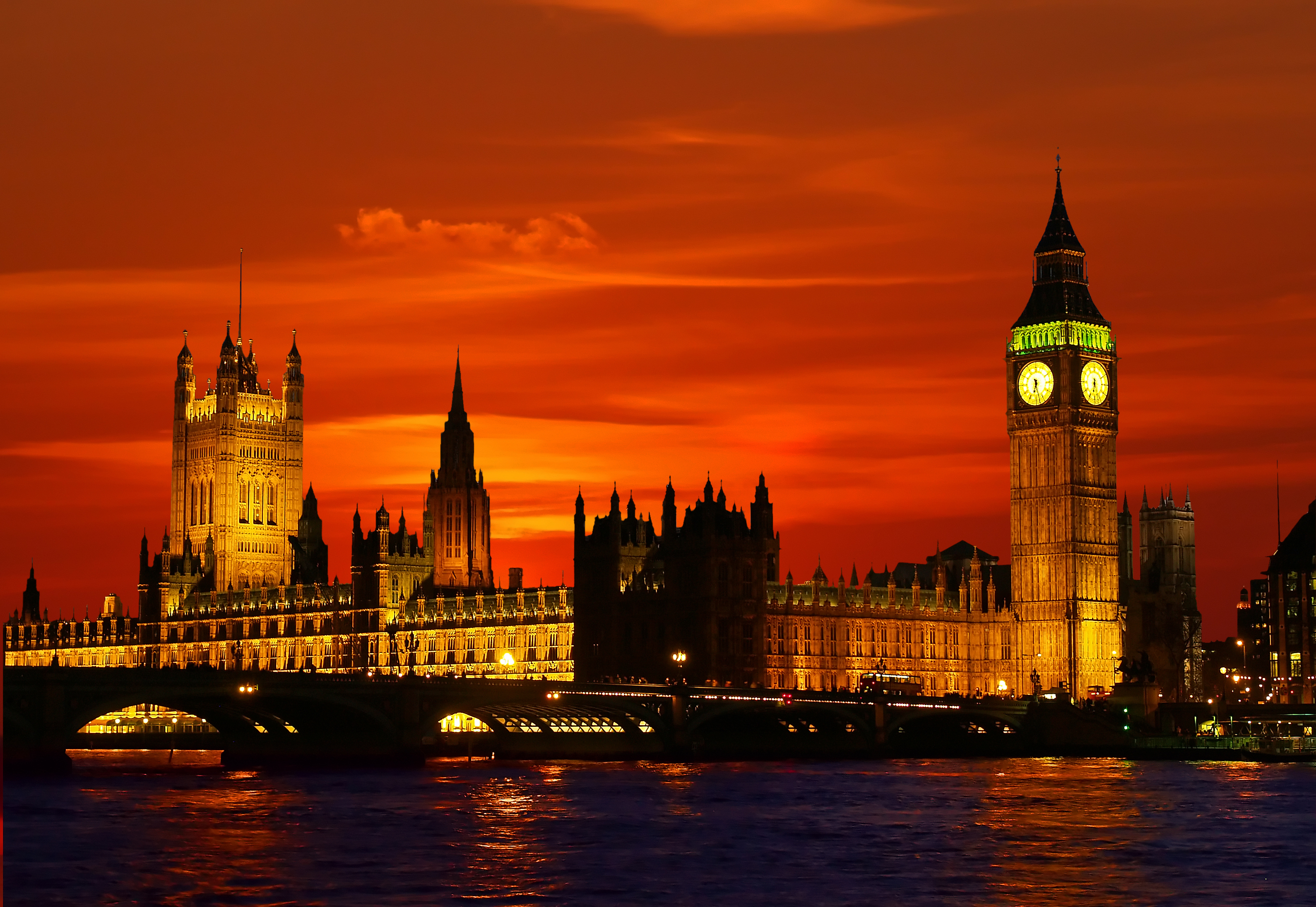
Big Ben in London

If statutes are silent, the courts readily apply principles of natural justice, to ensure there is no bias and a fair hearing. These common law principles are reinforced by the European Convention on Human Rights article 6, which in determining anyone’s ‘civil rights and obligations’, or ‘any criminal charge’, requires ‘a fair and public hearing within a reasonable time by an independent and impartial tribunal established by law.’ The rule against bias includes, for example, not allowing a judge to sit on any case in which he is financially interested, such as being a shareholder in a company that is a litigant.

This rule, which reflects a principle of equity that there must be no possibility of a conflict of interest, was applied in R v Bow Street Stipendiary Magistrate, ex p Pinochet (No 2) after the ex-dictator General Pinochet had been ordered by the House of Lords to be extradited to Chile to stand criminal trial. The charity, Amnesty International had argued in the appeal to support extradition, and Lord Hoffmann had not disclosed that he was a director of the charity. The House of Lords, after a complaint, held that its decision could not stand and had to be heard again. According to Lord Nolan, even if there was no actual bias or conflict, ‘in any case where the impartiality of a judge is in question the appearance of the matter is just as important as the reality.’ Justice ‘should not only be done but should manifestly and undoubtedly be seen to be done’.

Where conflicts of interest taint any public body’s decision, they may be quashed. In Porter v Magill the Conservative majority in Westminster City Council had a policy of selling off council houses in parts of the city where they believed new owners would be more likely to vote conservative. For this reason, the House of Lords held that the councillors had exercised their powers for improper purposes, and were motivated by bias.

The requirements of a fair hearing are that each side knows the case against them, can present their version of the facts, makes submissions on the rules of law, comments on material considered by the judge, and does not communicate with the judge without the other having the same opportunity. For instance, in Cooper v Wandsworth Board of Works, Mr Cooper failed to notify his intention to build a house. The Board of Works decided to demolish the house without giving him any hearing. Byles J held that although ‘there are no positive words in a statute requiring that the party shall be heard, yet the justice of the common law shall supply the omission of the legislature.’

The right to know any case against you was illustrated in R v Secretary of State for the Home Department, ex p Doody, where prisoners who received life sentences were told a minimum period they had to stay in prison before any review, but not the judiciary’s recommendations. The House of Lords held that they had to be able to know the recommended period, and to be able to make representations, before any time was fixed. Often, although there is no hard right to them, a failure to give reasons for a decision will be regarded as unfair, because giving reasons ‘is one of the fundamentals of good administration’. In all cases where human rights are at stake, the standards are higher.

== Human rights review ==
Like the common law grounds (that public bodies must act within lawful power, uphold legitimate expectations, and natural justice), human rights violations are a major ground for judicial review. Since World War II, the Holocaust, and the end of the British Empire, ensuring compatibility between international human rights and UK law has generally been considered a binding duty of the courts, but it was only since the Human Rights Act 1998 that the courts have had structured, statutory guidance for how to do this. The Supreme Court has, at least since 2014, adopted a practice of giving indirect effect to international law, to which the UK has acceded through binding treaties.

The post-war 'international Magna Carta', the Universal Declaration of Human Rights 1948 was expanded into two human rights Conventions, ratified by the UK, in 1966: the International Covenant on Civil and Political Rights and the International Covenant on Economic, Social and Cultural Rights. Within Europe, the UK was a founding signatory to the European Convention on Human Rights 1950 and the European Social Charter 1961. These documents were not also written into UK statute, because it was generally thought that the ordinary mechanisms of judicial review were sufficient.

However, to establish a violation of the Convention, claimants had to exhaust the judicial process within the UK before making another application to the Strasbourg court system, and there was no guarantee that UK courts would explicitly engage with human rights reasoning in their decisions. The Human Rights Act 1998 was eventually passed to 'bring rights home' in order to make the judicial process quicker, and to ensure greater influence by the UK judiciary in formulating what human rights meant.

Under the Human Rights Act 1998 section 3, courts have a duty to interpret legislation so 'far as it is possible to do so' to be compatible with the European Convention on Human Rights. This is a strong duty, and courts must, if a compatible interpretation is possible, use it because the Act presumes Parliament cannot have intended to violate international human rights law. For instance, in Ghaidan v Godin-Mendoza an applicant argued that he should have the right to succeed in title to a flat of his recently deceased homosexual, because the Rent Act 1977 said there was a right of succession if two people lived together 'as his or her wife or husband'.

The landlord argued this did not apply, because Godin-Mendoza was gay. This was clearly discriminatory in violation of ECHR article 14, and also an interference in the right to private life and one's home under ECHR article 8. The House of Lords held they could interpret the Act compatibly with the right to equal treatment and one's home, by reading the Rent Act 1977 like it said that they lived together 'as if they were his wife or husband'. If a compatible interpretation is impossible, a court must under section 4 issue a 'declaration of incompatibility', a (rare) notice to Parliament that the law does not match the Convention and should be changed. Parliament has always, since it was written in 1950, ultimately upheld the Convention. Under section 10(2) a Minister may if 'there are compelling reasons' amend legislation to remove the inconsistency, although Parliament often passes a new Act.

For instance, in Bellinger v Bellinger a transsexual woman, Elizabeth, married a man called Michael and sought a declaration that this was a lawful marriage under the Matrimonial Causes Act 1973 section 11, which described marriage as being between a 'male' and a 'female'. The judge refused because Elizabeth was classified as male at her birth, and the House of Lords held that, despite being 'profoundly conscious of the humanitarian considerations underlying Mrs Bellinger's claim', they could not interpret the statute compatibly (to give the word 'woman' a non-biological meaning), and so they instead issued a declaration of incompatibility. Parliament soon amended the law in the Gender Recognition Act 2004. Section 6 requires all public bodies to act compatibly with the Convention, and this includes courts in developing common law and equity. Section 8 enables the courts to give any 'relief or remedy' that is 'just and appropriate'. Despite indirect effect, there is not yet direct effect codified in statute for important economic and social rights, such as the right to work, fair pay, increased leisure time, and social security.

A central difference between judicial review based on human rights, and judicial review based on common law ground that a decision is "Wednesbury unreasonable" and ultra vires, is that infringements of rights can only be defended if the infringement is 'proportionate'. If the infringement is disproportionate, the right is violated. The proportionality test requires the court to ask, first, if the public body had a legitimate aim. For most rights, the legitimate aims are set out in sub-article 2, such as infringements for the purpose of national security, health, morals, or the rights of others. Second, the court asks whether the public body's conduct was 'appropriate' or 'suitable' to achieve the aim.

Third, it asks if the public body's conduct was 'necessary', and particularly whether it could have taken an alternative course of action that would not have interfered with the applicant's human rights. For instance, in R (Daly) v Secretary of State for the Home Department the House of Lords held that searches of a prisoner's cells which contained legally privileged correspondence with the prisoner's solicitor went further than necessary to achieve the aim of maintaining security and preventing crime, because it was a blanket policy that could be tailored to individual prisoners' circumstances, depending on whether they had been disruptive, a result the same as the common law. Fourth, the court asks whether the action was 'reasonable' in striking a balance between the interests of the individual and society. If anything is lacking, if there is no legitimate aim, or the public body's actions are not appropriate, necessary, and reasonable, its actions will be disproportionate and violate the applicant's right.

== Standing and remedies ==
Judicial review applications are more limited than other forms of legal claims, particularly those in contract, tort, unjust enrichment or criminal law, although these may be available against public bodies as well. Judicial review applications must be brought promptly, by people with a 'sufficient interest' and only against persons exercising public functions. First, unlike the typical limitation period of six years in contract or tort, the Civil Procedure Rules, rule 54.5 requires that judicial review applications must be made within 'three months after the grounds to make the claim first arose'.

Often, however, the same set of facts could be seen as giving rise to concurrent claims for judicial review. In O'Reilly v Mackman prisoners claimed that a prison breached rules of natural justice in deciding they lost the right to remission after a riot. The House of Lords held that, because they had no remedy in 'private law' by itself, and there was merely a 'legitimate expectation' that the prison's statutory obligations would be fulfilled, only a claim for judicial review could be brought, and the three month time limit had expired. It was an abuse of process to attempt a claim in tort for breach of statutory duty.

Second, according to the Senior Courts Act 1981 section 31 an applicant must have a 'sufficient interest' to bring a case. In R (National Federation of Self-Employed and Small Businesses Ltd) v Inland Revenue Commissioners a taxpayer group (the NFSE) claimed that the Revenue should collect tax from 6000 casual Fleet Street newspaper workers, after they had decided to end a practice of tax evasion over many years by collecting for a previous two years and not investigate earlier infringements. The House of Lords held the NFSE did not have a sufficient interest in the issue because this would interfere with the Revenue's general management powers. It was also held that a theatre preservation group had no standing to review a minister's decision refusing to designate a site as an historic monument.

On the other hand, it has been consistently recognised that public interest groups have standing to challenge decisions of public bodies, such as a respected and expert environmental group over pollution concerns, a development campaign group over excessive spending in an international dam project, and the government equality watchdog, the Equal Opportunities Commission, for whether UK legislation complied with EU law on redundancy protection.

Occasionally, the government has attempted to exclude judicial review through putting an ouster clause in an Act, providing that a public body's decisions should not be 'called into question'. However, in R (Privacy International) v Investigatory Powers Tribunal the Supreme Court suggested that ouster clauses cannot restrict the right to judicial review without the most express words, because of a strong common law presumption that Parliament intends for public bodies to act lawfully and within their jurisdiction.

A third issue is which bodies are subject to judicial review. This clearly includes any government department, minister, council, or entity set up under a statute to fulfil public functions. However, the division between 'public' and 'private' bodies has become increasingly blurred as more regulatory and public actions have been outsourced to private entities. In R (Datafin plc) v Panel on Take-overs and Mergers the Court of Appeal held that the Takeover Panel, a private association organised by companies and financial institutions in the City of London to enforce standards in takeover bids, was subject to judicial review because it exercised 'immense power de facto by devising, promulgating, amending and interpreting the City Code' with 'sanctions are no less effective because they are applied indirectly and lack a legally enforceable base'. By contrast, the Jockey Club was not thought to exercise sufficient power to be subject to judicial review. Nor was the Aston Cantlow Parochial Church Council, because although a public authority, it was not a 'core' public authority with any significant regulatory function.

In a controversial decision, YL v Birmingham CC held that a large private corporation called Southern Cross was not a public authority subject to judicial review, even though it was contracted by the council to run most nursing homes in Birmingham. This decision was immediately reversed by statute, and in R (Weaver) v London and Quadrant Housing Trust the Court of Appeal held that a housing trust, supported by government subsidies, could be subject to judicial review for unjust termination of a tenancy.

The Supreme Court Act 1981 section 31 sets out the main remedies available through judicial review: a mandatory order (previously called mandamus) to make a public body do something, a prohibiting order (prohibition) to stop a public body doing something, a quashing order (certiorari) to cancel an act, an injunction, or a declaration. The old writ of habeas corpus also remains available, to require that a person be delivered to court and freed.

In contract, tort or unjust enrichment claims against public bodies, the courts may order standard remedies of compensation for loss, restitution of gains, or an award of specific performance. In Chief Constable of the North Wales Police v Evans, however, the House of Lords held that although a police officer was unlawfully dismissed in violation of statute, compensatory damages were a more appropriate remedy than a mandatory order for reinstatement given the rarity (at the time) of specific performance in employment contracts. Occasionally the law makes provision for special privileges or immunities of public bodies from the ordinary law, but these are generally construed restrictively.

== Administrative justice ==
=== Tribunals ===
The tribunal system of the United Kingdom is part of the national system of administrative justice with tribunals classed as non-departmental public bodies (NDPBs) of judges.

- Tribunals, Courts and Enforcement Act 2007
- Leggatt Review

=== Public Inquiries ===
- Tribunals of Inquiry (Evidence) Act 1921
- Inquiries Act 2005

=== Ombudsmen ===
In the United Kingdom a post of Ombudsman is attached to the Westminster Parliament with additional posts at the Scottish Parliament, the Welsh Assembly and other government institutions. The Ombudsman's role is to investigate complaints of maladministration.

== See also ==
- UK constitutional law
- Administrative Court (England and Wales)
- Scots administrative law
- Australian administrative law
- Canadian administrative law
- US administrative law
