= Pointu =

Pointu is a French surname. Notable people with this surname include:

- Germaine Pointu (1900–1943), married name Germaine Cernay, French mezzo-soprano
- Jeannette Pointu, Belgian comic book character
- Monsieur Pointu (1922–2006), Canadian violinist

== See also ==
- Matadeen v Pointu, Supreme Court of Mauritius case
