= R. v. North and East Devon Health Authority, ex parte Coughlan =

Case of the Court of Appeal of England and Wales

- Court: Court of Appeal of England and Wales
- Full case name: Regina v. North and East Devon Health Authority, ex parte Coughlan
- Decided: 16 July 1999
- Citation: [2001] Q.B. 213, [2000] 2 W.L.R. 622, [2000] 3 All E.R. 850, 51 B.M.L.R. 1, [1999] Lloyd's Rep. Med. 306, 97 L.G.R. 703
- Transcript: [1999] EWCA Civ 1871

Court membership
- Judges sitting: Lord Woolf M.R.; Mummery and Sedley L.JJ.

Case opinions
- Decision by: Lord Woolf M.R.

Keywords
- Administrative law, judicial review, substantive legitimate expectation

R. v. North and East Devon Health Authority, ex parte Coughlan is a seminal case decided by the Court of Appeal of England and Wales in 1999 which clarified the court's role in relation to cases which involve substantive legitimate expectations. The Court held that when reviewing a decision of a public authority which is contrary to a prior assurance or representation by the authority, its role is not always limited to assessing if the decision is Wednesbury unreasonable or irrational. In some situations, it is entitled to determine whether it is fair to compel the authority to fulfil its representation, or whether there is a sufficient overriding public interest which justifies allowing the authority to depart from the promise made.

The case involved a severely disabled lady, Miss Coughlan, who was receiving nursing care in Mardon House, a National Health Service facility managed by the North and East Devon Health Authority. The Authority had made several representations to her that she would be able to live out her days in Mardon House. Subsequently, the Health Authority decided to shut the facility down as the cost of operating it was becoming excessive. Coughlan sought judicial review of the Authority's decision, claiming that its representations had induced in her a legitimate expectation that Mardon House would be her home for life.

The Court of Appeal decided the matter in Coughlan's favour. It took into account the importance of the promise to her, and the fact that the consequence to the Health Authority of honouring the promise was merely financial in nature, and while the Authority had agreed to fund the cost of her treatment it had offered no alternative permanent accommodation. In the circumstances, the Court was of the view that for the Authority to frustrate Coughlan's legitimate expectation was so unfair that it amounted to an abuse of power. Furthermore, there were no overriding public interest considerations to justify the Authority's decision.

The Court distinguished Coughlan's situation from one where an authority had not given an express promise but had only made a representation that an individual was entitled to be treated in a manner consistent with a policy in force at the time. In this situation, the authority is only compelled to take into account its previous position or the representation made to the individual before deciding how it should proceed, and if it has done so the court may only determine if the authority acted in a Wednesbury-unreasonable manner.

== Facts ==
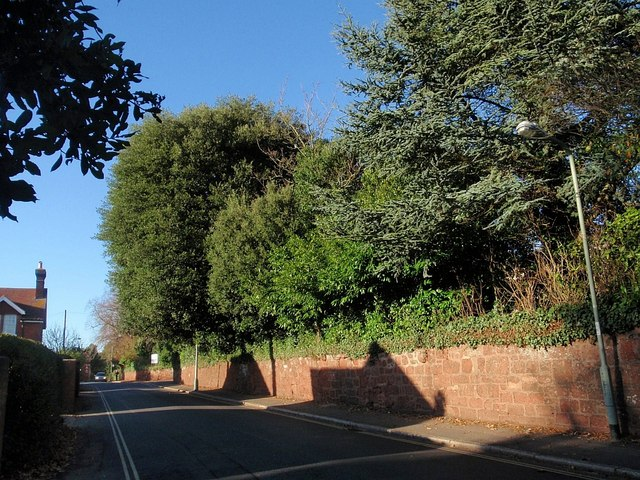
Wonford Road in Exeter, UK. Near this place along the same road is the Royal Devon and Exeter NHS Foundation Trust's Mardon Neuro-Rehabilitation Centre. When it was known as Mardon House, its threatened closure led to a 1999 judgment, ex parte Coughlan, in which the Court of Appeal of England and Wales said a disabled resident's legitimate expectation that she would have a "home for life" there had been breached by a health authority then managing the facility.

The respondent, Miss Coughlan, was grievously injured in a road accident in 1971. From the date of her accident until 1993, she resided in and received nursing care in Newcourt Hospital. As the facilities in Newcourt Hospital were deemed inadequate for the care of long term, severely disabled patients, a new hospital called Mardon House in Essex was established by National Health Service (NHS) to replace Newcourt Hospital. The North and East Devon Health Authority expressly assured Coughlan and other patients with similar health conditions that they could live in Mardon "for as long as they chose".

However, in 1996, the Health Authority decided to close Mardon and to transfer the long-term general nursing care of the applicant to the local authority. The Health Authority reasoned that the continued provision of the care service to the current residents in Mardon had become costly, was not financially viable, and resulted in fewer resources for other services. Although the Health Authority undertook to fund the applicant's care for the remainder of her life, they did not offer to provide her with a home for life as promised.

Subsequently, Coughlan applied for judicial review of the Health Authority's decision to close Mardon, and asserted that the Authority had acted unlawfully "in breaking the recent and unequivocal promise given by it that the applicant and their patients could lived there for as long as they chose".

== Decision of the High Court ==
Justice Hidden, hearing the matter in the High Court, entered judgment for Coughlan. He held that the representations made by the Health Authority towards Coughlan and the other patients amounted to an explicit promise that Mardon House would be their home for life. The promise made was a promise to provide care at Mardon House, rather than at various unspecified locations as contended by the Health Authority. To resile from such a promise would amount to unfairness. However, in the case where an overriding public interest demanded, the Health Authority would be justified to break its promise. On the facts of the case, the Health Authority could not produce proof that there were compelling circumstances amounting to an overriding public interest to justify a departure from the promise made.

The Health Authority appealed against the decision of the High Court to the Court of Appeal of England and Wales. It contended that the promise was not one that was absolute and unqualified, and there were compelling public interests which justified the Health Authority's decision to close Mardon House.

== Decision of the Court of Appeal ==
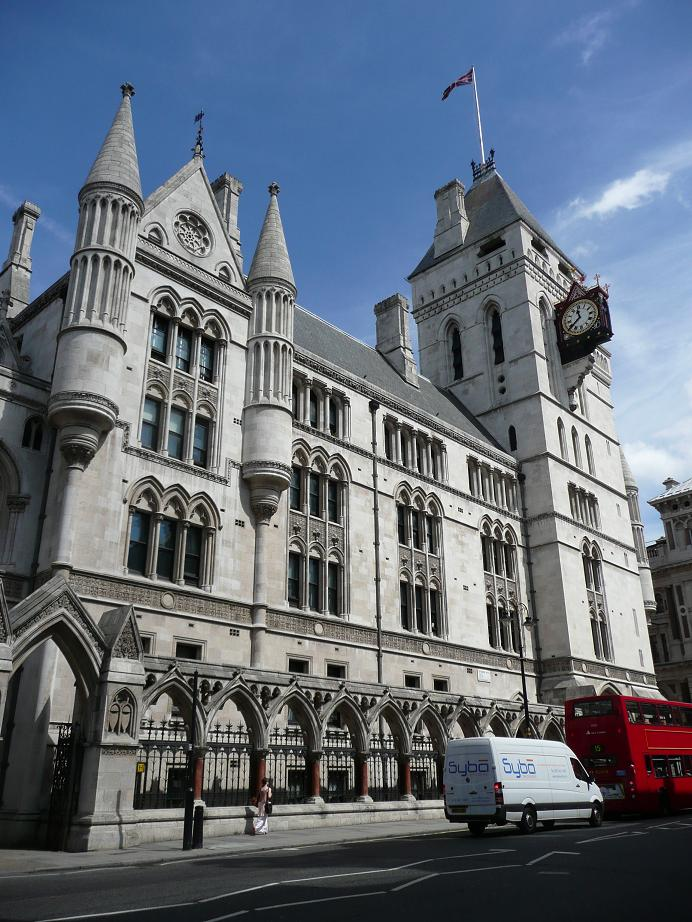
The Royal Courts of Justice in London, which house the High Court and the Court of Appeal. In the Ex parte Coughlan case, both of these courts agreed that substantive legitimate expectation is a ground of judicial review in administrative law its own right.

In a judgment delivered on 16 July 1999 Lord Woolf, the Master of the Rolls, speaking on behalf of the Court of Appeal, upheld the judgment of the High Court. He held that Coughlan had established a legitimate expectation of a substantive nature as a result of the promise made by the Health Authority to the patients who had agreed to move from Newcourt Hospital to Mardon House. The legitimate expectation arose from the fact that the promise made to Coughlan had been specific to those premises, expressly made to a small group of people within the same category, conveyed in unqualified terms, and repeated and confirmed in representations made to the group.

The Health Authority was unable to show that there were overriding public interest considerations which warranted a departure from the promise. The Court also took into account the fact that the Authority had failed to mention any alternative accommodation to be offered to the applicant. Thus, it concluded that the decision to close Mardon House constituted unfairness amounting to an abuse of power.

=== Substantive legitimate expectation ===
The Court of Appeal clarified the position of the doctrine of legitimate expectation in the common law by examining its nature and the different strains of legitimate expectations. A claim for a public authority to act according to a legitimate expectation arises when the authority promises a member of the public that he or she will be treated in a certain manner, but the authority is instead inclined to act in contravention of that promise or in breach of the legitimate expectation created. Cases where a legitimate expectation will be found to exist can take three forms, the first and third being substantive in nature:

- Category (a): substantive legitimate expectation – change of policy. The first form is a person's legitimate expectation that only extends to an expectation that the individual is entitled to be treated in a manner consistent with the authority's policy in force at the time. In this situation, the authority is only compelled to take into account its previous position or the representation made to the applicant before coming to a conclusion on how it should proceed. If it has done so, the court's power to review the decision is limited to the classic ground of judicial review known as "Wednesbury unreasonableness" or irrationality – in other words, that it is "so outrageous in the defiance of logic or of accepted moral standards that no sensible person who had applied his mind to the question to be decided could have arrived at it". (In a subsequent case, R. v. Secretary of State for Education and Employment, ex parte Begbie (1999), the Court of Appeal clarified that cases fall into this category where a sizeable part of the population is affected and the change of policy involves "what may inelegantly be called the macro-political field".)
- Category (b): procedural legitimate expectation – no consultation. The second form occurs when a public authority's promise or practice has induced a legitimate expectation of a procedural nature. An illustration of such a legitimate expectation would be an expectation to be consulted before an authority reaches a conclusion, arising from a representation made by the authority. In such a situation, the court is bound to hold that the procedure be conducted as legitimately expected unless there are overriding reasons to justify abrogating the procedure.
- Category (c): substantive legitimate expectation – promise having the character of a contract. The third form manifests itself when a public authority's promise or practice has resulted in a legitimate expectation of a substantive benefit or a particular outcome of a situation. This type of case is likely to arise when the promise is confined to a few individuals, and thus has the character of a contract. For situations in this third category, such as the present case, the court must determine whether frustration of the expectation would be so unfair as to amount to an abuse of power by the authority. Unless sufficient justification is present, the authority is obliged to act in accordance with what is legitimately expected of it.

=== Legitimate expectation and fairness in public law ===
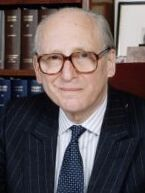
Lord Bingham of Cornhill who, as a Lord Justice of Appeal, held in a 1989 case called ex parte M.F.K. Underwriting Agents Ltd. that "[t]he doctrine of legitimate expectation is rooted in fairness"

In adjudicating questions of legitimate expectations, the court has two essential roles. First, it has to determine whether a legitimate expectation exists, and the nature of this expectation. Secondly, it has to determine whether sufficient justification is present to allow the public authority to depart from its expected obligations. The court is the sole judge of these questions. In Ex parte Coughlan the Court of Appeal observed that this role is defined by the requirement for procedural and substantive fairness in public law. The court plays a role of ensuring that such fairness is observed in dealings between public authorities and members of the public, since "reneging without adequate justification, by an otherwise unlawful decision on a lawful promise or practice adopted towards a limited number of individuals" can be considered an abuse of power by an authority. As Lord Justice of Appeal Thomas Bingham held in R. v. Inland Revenue Commissioners, ex parte M.F.K. Underwriting Agents Ltd. (1989):

If a public authority so conducts itself as to create a legitimate expectation that a certain course will be followed it would often be unfair if the authority were permitted to follow a different course to the detriment of one who entertained the expectation, particularly if he acted on it. ... The doctrine of legitimate expectation is rooted in fairness.

As a result, the court's role should not be limited to reviewing such cases on the classic Wednesbury ground of review because to limit the review to the rationality of the decision would make the public authority the judge of its own decision. Ordinarily, a justification for acting against a legitimate expectation would often be sufficient and rational from the position of the authority regardless of objective judgment. In Ex parte Coughlan, the Court of Appeal also held that the Wednesbury ground of judicial review is not compromised by the doctrine of legitimate expectation. Rather, the latter complements the classic doctrine by providing a further benchmark where public authorities are held accountable to good standards of public administration.

== Academic opinions ==
=== Abuse of power ===
The Court of Appeal's decision in Ex parte Coughlan left a number of questions unanswered. For one, several commentators have said that the idea of abuse of power is rather vague. Søren Schønberg and Paul Craig posit that while abuse of power was the base the Court of Appeal used in reaching their decision, it is not "an unequivocal guide as to the standard by which the Court will judge the sufficiency of those reasons" given by the public authority. Instead, they suggest that the true rubric for substantive legitimate expectation is proportionality because it is:

... a more precise, structured test of review than the notion of abuse of power applied in Coughlan. When faced with a conflict between a legitimate expectation and an administrative decision purporting to achieve some objective, the court would check whether that action was necessary and suited to attain the objective, and whether it imposed excessive burdens upon the individual.

Iain Steele goes so far as to say: "In Coughlan, proportionality is the test that dare not speak its name".

In her discourse on Ex parte Coughlan, Melanie Roberts opined that the requirement of abuse of power could apply in cases of ultra vires promises as well. In deciding whether to allow a public body which had made a promise beyond its power to renege on its promise, the court would need to balance the public interest and the private interest, legality and certainty. If the private interest outweighs the public interest then the court should hold that it would be an abuse of power for the public body to resile from the representation.

=== Standards of review ===
Under category (a) in Ex parte Coughlan, in order to act lawfully the decision-maker must merely have treated the applicant's legitimate expectation as a relevant consideration. However, David Pievsky notes that when coupled with the court's refusal to determine the weight that should be given to the promise as a relevant consideration, the result could be that "in practice a legitimate expectation could well have no effect". Should the decision-maker attach little weight to the promise, thereby ultimately choosing not to honour it, "the decision can only be attacked on Wednesbury grounds. The legitimate expectation appears to have added very little." Steele argues against this, stating that the "very status of an expectation as 'legitimate' necessarily entails that it should be accorded a more than minimal weight".

Instead of Wednesbury unreasonableness as a standard of review for substantive legitimate expectation, some commentators have strongly encouraged the use of proportionality because it is "particularly appropriate where ... conflicting interests must be weighed against one another". While this view is generally accepted amongst academics, Mark Elliott argues that "[t]he rationality and proportionality doctrines are not competitors" and are, in fact, "complementary". On the other hand, Philip Sales and Karen Steyn have observed that the proportionality approach is only appropriate where the public body has "specified legitimate objectives". However, at present, "there is no instrument which defines rights or which specifies legitimate objectives in a way that would lead to the conclusion that application of the proportionality approach would promote conceptual clarity in this area".

Schønberg and Craig have propounded the use of a "balancing approach" should the courts not choose to acknowledge the proportionality test. This would entail the balancing of "the requirements of substantive fairness against any overriding interest relied upon for taking an action". However, they note that this approach is "lacking in precision" and does not state "if judicial intervention presupposes a significant, serious or even extreme imbalance in the individual's expectation".

=== Promises versus policies ===
Melanie Roberts has argued that substantive legitimate expectations are easier to uphold in respect of a promise, in contrast to a policy. This is because an unequivocal representation in the form of a promise made to a person carries "a particular moral force" and because holding the public body to that representation is less likely to have serious consequences for the administration as a whole. Ex parte Coughlan is an ideal substantive legitimate expectation claim precisely because it involved a promise to a few individuals.

On the contrary, since "it is in the nature of general policy that it may be changed", a change in "general policy statements addressed to the world or large numbers of people" are more unlikely to result in legitimate expectations. Although the main difference between promises and policies are that promises are specifically directed to one or a few individuals stating what the public body will do in their particular cases, Roberts has acknowledged that "[t]he difficulty which may arise however is in the categorisation of cases; the difference between a policy and an individual promise may not always be clear ...".

== See also ==
- Legitimate expectation
- United Kingdom administrative law
