= Kruse v Johnson =

UK administrative law case

- Court: Divisional Court
- Citation: [1898] 2 QB 91

Case opinions
- Lord Russell CJ

Keywords
- Judicial review, class, discrimination

Kruse v Johnson [1898] 2 QB 91 is a UK administrative law case, concerning the judicial review of decisions by public bodies. It is notable as Lord Russell CJ established the principle that if a measure were to indirectly discriminate between classes, it could be declared void. According to him, if rules under authority of an Act of Parliament,

... were found to be partial and unequal in their operation as between different classes; if they were manifestly unjust; if they disclosed bad faith; if they involved such oppressive or gratuitous interference with the rights of those subject to them as could find no justification in the minds of reasonable men, the Court might well say, “Parliament never intended to give authority to make such rules; they are unreasonable and ultra vires."

== Facts ==
Kent County Council made a bylaw, under authority of the Local Government Act 1888 section 16, that nobody, after being requested to stop by a constable, could play music or sing within 50 yards of a dwelling house in a public place or highway. The claimant had been singing a hymn within 50 yards of a dwelling house, and had refused to stop after a constable had told him to do so. He was given a penalty, and sought judicial review to declare that the bylaw was void.

== Judgment ==
Lord Russell CJ, giving the court's leading judgment, held the bylaw was valid on the ground that it was not unreasonable, because it did not have a discriminatory impact on the population. He said the following.

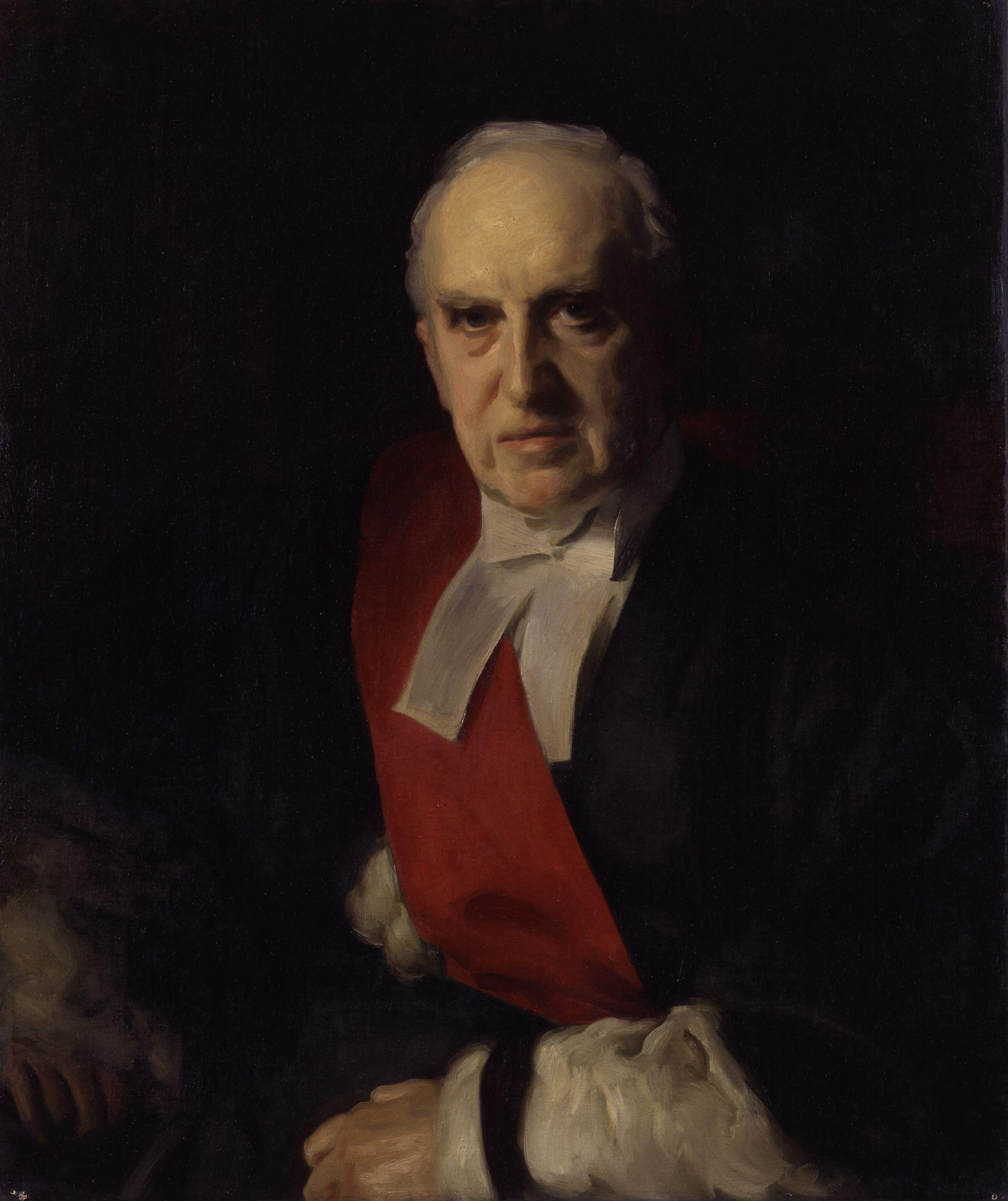
Lord Russell CJ.

I have thought it well to deal with these points in some detail, and for this reason that the great majority of the cases in which the question of by-laws has been discussed are not cases of by-laws of bodies of a public representative character entrusted by Parliament with delegated authority, but are for the most part cases of railway companies, dock companies, or other like companies, which carry on their business for their own profit, although incidentally for the advantage of the public. In this class of case it is right that the Courts should jealously watch the exercise of these powers, and guard against their unnecessary or unreasonable exercise to the public disadvantage. But, when the Court is called upon to consider the by-laws of public representative bodies clothed with the ample authority which I have described, and exercising that authority accompanied by the checks and safeguards which have been mentioned, I think the consideration of such by-laws ought to be approached from a different standpoint. They ought to be supported if possible. They ought to be, as has been said, “benevolently” interpreted, and credit ought to be given to those who have to administer them that they will be reasonably administered. This involves the introduction of no new canon of construction. But, further, looking to the character of the body legislating under the delegated authority of Parliament, to the subject-matter of such legislation, and to the nature and extent of the authority given to deal with matters which concern them, and in the manner which to them shall seem meet, I think courts of justice ought to be slow to condemn as invalid any by-law, so made under such conditions, on the ground of supposed unreasonableness. Notwithstanding what Cockburn CJ said in Bailey v Williamson, an analogous case, I do not mean to say that there may not be cases in which it would be the duty of the Court to condemn by-laws, made under such authority as these were made, as invalid because unreasonable. But unreasonable in what sense? If, for instance, they were found to be partial and unequal in their operation as between different classes; if they were manifestly unjust; if they disclosed bad faith; if they involved such oppressive or gratuitous interference with the rights of those subject to them as could find no justification in the minds of reasonable men, the Court might well say, “Parliament never intended to give authority to make such rules; they are unreasonable and ultra vires.” But it is in this sense, and in this sense only, as I conceive, that the question of unreasonableness can properly be regarded. A by-law is not unreasonable merely because particular judges may think that it goes further than is prudent or necessary or convenient, or because it is not accompanied by a qualification or an exception which some judges may think ought to be there.

Matthew J dissented.

Chitty LJ, Wright J, Darling J, and Channell J concurred with Lord Russell CJ.

== See also ==
- UK administrative law
- UK constitutional law
- Equality Act 2010
- Matadeen v Pointu [1998] UKPC 9
- Code of Criminal Procedure of Bangladesh
- Civil Rights Cases 109 US 3 (1883)
