= Carltona doctrine =

Principle in United Kingdom administrative law

The Carltona doctrine (or Carltona principle) expresses the idea that, in United Kingdom law, the acts of government departmental officials are synonymous with the actions of the minister in charge of that department. The point was established in Carltona Ltd v Commissioners of Works.

== The judgment in Carltona ==
Faced with the requisition of their factory by the wartime government, the factory owners raised a judicial review action to challenge the legality of the requisition order. The order had been made under the auspices of the Defence (General) Regulations 1939, which authorised the Commissioners of Works to requisition such land as they deemed necessary in the national interest. The regulations specified that the Commissioners' powers were exercisable by, inter alia, the Minister of Works and Planning. The factory owners sought to argue that the requisition was invalid because the order had not in fact been signed by the minister, but by an official within the Ministry of Works and Planning. In rejecting this contention, the Master of the Rolls, Lord Greene, acknowledged the realities of government in the 20th century:

In the administration of government in this country the functions which are given to ministers (and constitutionally properly given to ministers because they are constitutionally responsible) are functions so multifarious that no minister could ever personally attend to them ... [therefore] The duties imposed upon ministers and the powers given to ministers are normally exercised under the authority of ministers by responsible officials of the department. Public business could not be carried on if that were not the case.

This statement of the way government operates has become more true in recent decades, as increased state interventionism and juridification have produced a rapid growth in the use of delegated legislation. Confronted with this reality, the court considered that it would have been preposterous to construe the wording of the Regulations so narrowly that only the minister, in person, could exercise the powers. Thus, Lord Greene explained that "Constitutionally, the decision of such an official is, of course, the decision of the minister."

The essence of the Carltona doctrine, therefore, lies in treating the actions of departmental officials as having been taken by the relevant minister. It is not the case that the minister has delegated his decision-making power to a subordinate, and therefore the doctrine achieves consistency with the principle that Parliament's delegates have, unless specifically provided by statute, no power to delegate (delegatus non potest delegare).

Lord Greene proceeded to reconcile this with the doctrine of parliamentary accountability on the basis that:

It is he [the minister] who must answer before Parliament for anything that his officials have done under his authority, and, if for an important matter he selected an official of such junior standing that he could not be expected competently to perform the work, the minister would have to answer for that in Parliament. The whole system of departmental organisation and administration is based on the view that ministers, being responsible to Parliament, will see that important duties are committed to experienced officials. If they do not do that, Parliament is the place where complaint must be made against them.

== Scope of the rule ==
Despite suggestions to the contrary by some academic commentators, it seems that there is no restriction on the applicability of the doctrine on account of the nature of the power being wielded. In HMA v Copeland it was held by the highest criminal court in Scotland, the High Court of Justiciary, that "there is no obligation on the minister to exercise his powers personally even when those powers involve a serious invasion of the freedom or property rights of the subject". However, in some instances, Parliament has chosen to override this position by expressly providing in statute that the relevant minister must exercise the power in person.

== Modern development ==
The Supreme Court of the United Kingdom dealt with the application of the Carltona doctrine in R v Adams [2020] UKSC 19. In 1973, Gerry Adams, a politician in Northern Ireland, was detained without trial by an interim custody order made under Article 4 of the Detention of Terrorists (Northern Ireland) Order 1972. It was later revealed that the Order required the Secretary of State to have considered the matter personally. Adams challenged the validity of the decision, arguing that the Secretary of State had failed to do so. The issue before the Supreme Court was whether the Carltona principle operated to permit the making of such an Order by a Minister of State (para 8). Lord Kerr, delivering a unanimous judgment, held that the wording of the 1972 Order was clear enough to exclude the application of the Carltona doctrine (paras 31–32). Besides, in light of the seriousness of the consequences of the decision, the decision ought to be made by the Secretary of State personally (para 38). There was also no evidence that it would create an undue burden on the Secretary of State (para 39).

As to whether there is a general presumption in law that the Carltona doctrine shall apply, Lord Kerr suggested that:

It is unnecessary for the purposes of the present appeal to reach a firm conclusion on the question whether it is now established that there is a presumption that Parliament should be taken to have intended that the Carltona principle should apply. It is true that in Oladehinde Lord Griffiths said that a statutory duty placed on a minister may "generally" be exercised by a member of his department, but I believe that he was not there proposing that there was a legal presumption to that effect. I am not persuaded that the authorities, apart from McCafferty and the decision of the Court of Appeal in the present case, have espoused that position. It is, of course, the case that Parliament legislates against the background that the Carltona principle is well-established. And it is also relevant that Parliament has shown itself on occasions willing to register the displacement of the principle in explicit terms. These considerations must influence the judgment as to whether, properly construed, a particular item of legislation is in keeping with the principle or not. But that does not amount, in my opinion, to the creation of a presumption in law that the principle must be taken to apply unless it has been removed by express statutory language.

Paul Daly, Research Chair in Administrative Law & Governance at the University of Ottawa, has suggested that the above quotation is merely obiter dictum and a misunderstanding of the law. The Carltona doctrine merely reflects the constitutional reality that ministers act through their servants. The case itself broke no new ground and merely applied the established principles.

The Supreme Court's judgment in R v Adams has come under intense criticism. Richard Ekins and Sir Stephen Laws have argued that it challenges the ordinary functioning of government and called for the decision to be overturned by Parliament. Their view was endorsed by former Attorney General Sir Geoffrey Cox and former Cabinet secretary Lord Butler of Brockwell, among others. Former law lord Lord Brown of Eaton-under-Heywood also called for Adams to be legislatively overturned.

In 2023, Lord Godson and Lord Faulks moved an amendment to the Northern Ireland Troubles (Legacy and Reconciliation) Bill to bar Adams and others from receiving compensation as a result of the judgment. The government later introduced its own amendment, which was accepted by the House of Lords.

== Ireland ==
The Supreme Court of Ireland has confirmed that the Carltona doctrine applies to its fullest extent to the Irish civil service also: see Devanney v Shields [1998] 2 I.R. 230.

== See also ==
- Civil Service
