= Legitimate expectation =

Legal doctrine regarding provided rights and services

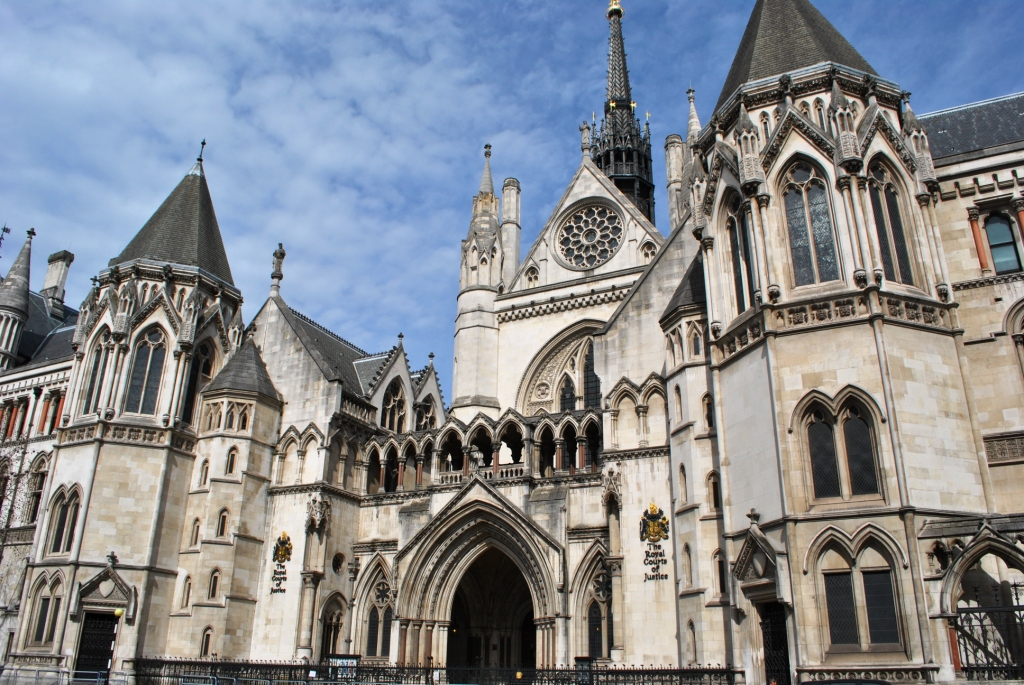
The Royal Courts of Justice, London. The doctrine of legitimate expectation was predominantly developed by the UK courts.

The doctrine of legitimate expectation was first developed in English law as a ground of judicial review in administrative law to protect a procedural or substantive interest when a public authority rescinds from a representation made to a person. It is based on the principles of natural justice and fairness, and seeks to prevent authorities from abusing power.

The courts of the United Kingdom have recognized both procedural and substantive legitimate expectations. A procedural legitimate expectation rests on the presumption that a public authority will follow a certain procedure in advance of a decision being taken, while a substantive legitimate expectation arises where an authority makes a lawful representation that an individual will receive or continue to receive some kind of substantive benefit. In determining a claim for an alleged breach of a legitimate expectation, a court will deliberate over three key considerations:

- whether a legitimate expectation has arisen;
- whether it would be unlawful for the authority to frustrate such an expectation; and
- if it is found that the authority has done so, what remedies are available to the aggrieved person.

Procedural legitimate expectations have been recognized in a number of common law jurisdictions. In contrast, notwithstanding their acceptance and protection in the UK, substantive legitimate expectations have not been universally recognized. For instance, they have been given effect in Singapore but not in Australia.

== Introduction ==
=== Origins and basis of the doctrine ===
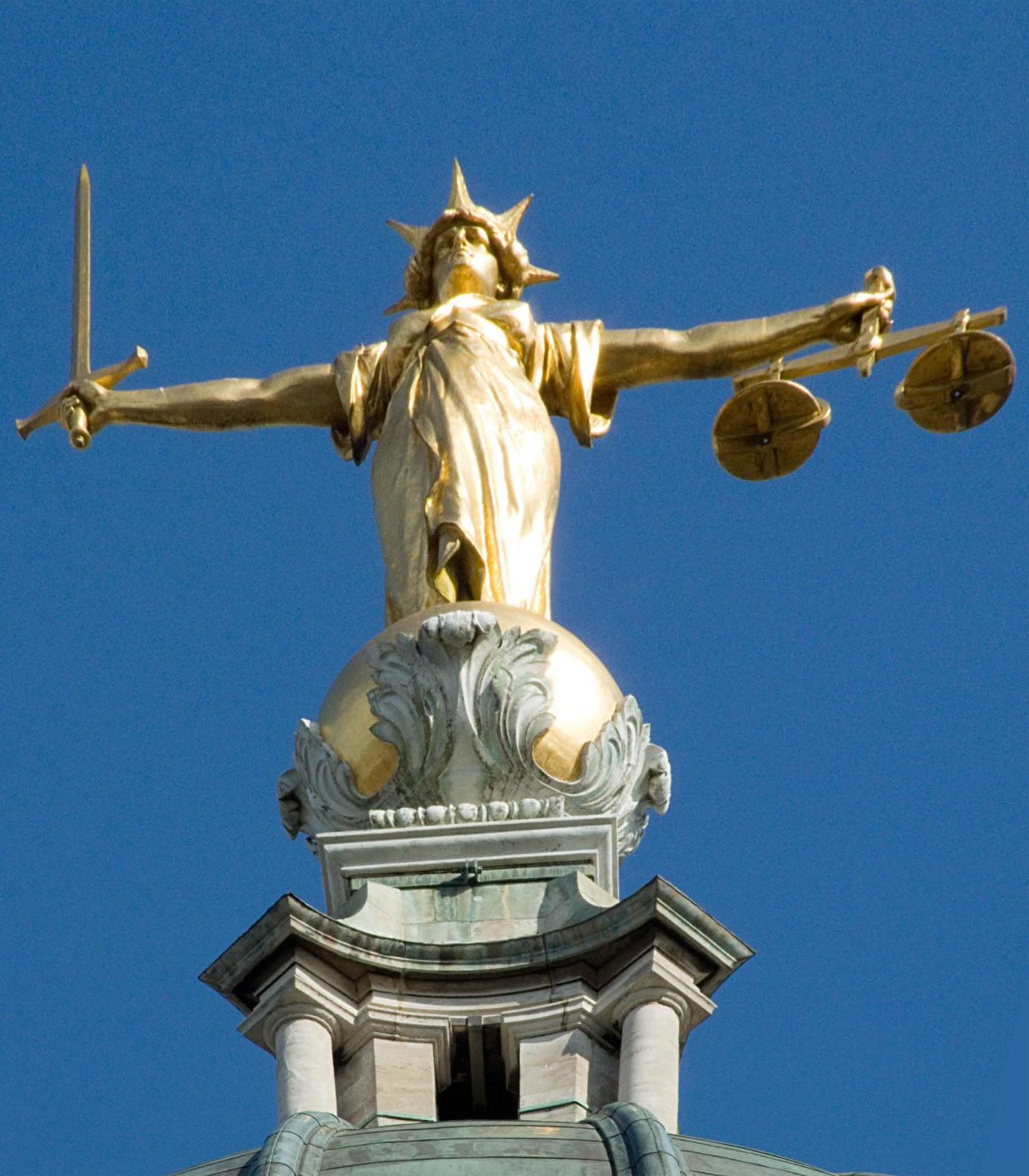
F. W. Pomeroy's 1906 statue of Lady Justice on the dome of the Old Bailey in London. The doctrine of legitimate expectation is viewed as an offshoot of natural justice.

Since its inception, the doctrine of legitimate expectation has been viewed as an offshoot of natural justice. The duty to act fairly is a core tenet of administrative law and a predominant feature in the application of the rules of natural justice. With each individual's entitlement to natural justice and fairness, legitimate expectation reinforces the duty of public bodies to act fairly. It is this protection of fairness that made way for the courts' acknowledgement of legitimate expectations. In their elaboration of the doctrine, courts of the United Kingdom adopted other key aspects of judicial review such as Wednesbury unreasonableness, fairness, and abuse of power to justify the existence and the protection of legitimate expectations.

The term legitimate expectation was first used in the case of Schmidt v Secretary of State for Home Affairs (1968), but was not applied on the facts. Subsequently, in O'Reilly v Mackman (1983) the doctrine of legitimate expectation was recognized as part of judicial review in public law, allowing individuals to challenge the legality of decisions on the grounds that the decision-maker "had acted outwith the powers conferred upon it". Although initially unclear, the nature and boundaries of the doctrine of legitimate expectation have been elucidated by seminal cases such as Council of Civil Service Unions v Minister for the Civil Service (the GCHQ case, 1983). and R v North and East Devon Health Authority, ex parte Coughlan (1999). Notwithstanding efforts of the courts, some ambiguity as to when legitimate expectations arise persisted. In response, Lord Justice of Appeal John Laws proposed the aspiration of "good administration" as a justification for the protection of legitimate expectations.

=== Legal framework ===
A procedural legitimate expectation is created when a representation is made by a public authority that it will follow a certain procedure before making a decision on the substantive merits of a particular case. Examples of procedural legitimate expectations include an expectation to be consulted and to a fair hearing. A substantive legitimate expectation is formed where a representation is made by an authority as to the final decision and outcome that the authority will make in a particular case.

Upon reviewing a claim for the protection of a legitimate expectation against a public authority's decision, courts will deliberate over three key considerations:

- The situations and circumstances in which legitimate expectations arise.
- Instances in which it would be unlawful for the public authority to frustrate such an expectation.
- The remedies that would be available to the aggrieved party if it is found that the public authority had unlawfully frustrated a legitimate expectation.

== When does an expectation become legitimate? ==
When determining if a legitimate expectation is present, the required conditions are as follows:

- The representation must be clear, unambiguous, and not have any relevant qualification.
- The expectation must be induced by the behaviour of the public authority.
- The representation must have been made by someone who had actual or apparent authority.
- The representation must be applicable to the aggrieved parties.

Courts take into account not only the reasonableness of the expectation but other considerations such as the nature of representation made. In the GCHQ case, Lord Diplock stated that a legitimate expectation is one which "has consequences to which effect will be given in public law, whereas an expectation or hope that some benefit or advantage would continue to be enjoyed, although it might well be entertained by a 'reasonable' man, would not necessarily have such consequences". It is a question of law, and has to be decided on an objective basis with full reference to the facts of the case.

Although the GCHQ case states that "effect will be given in public law" for a legitimate expectation, the legitimacy of an expectation is not meant to be a conclusory label assuring the court's provision of remedies, but rather to warrant prima facie protection only. It may be rebutted by countervailing public interests.

=== Nature of representation made ===
A legitimate expectation does not arise when it is made ultra vires of the decision-maker's statutory powers, that is, when the decision-maker lacked legal power to make the representation. Courts are reluctant to protect such an expectation that has been created. The rationale is undoubtedly clear and rests on the scope of the administrative authority's powers. It prevents public authorities from expanding their powers simply by making ultra vires representations. Secondly, allowing public authorities to be bound by their ultra vires representations may potentially prevent them from exercising their statutory powers or duties. Also, allowing a public authority to be bound could be unfair to third parties who are affected. However, courts may be obliged to protect legitimate expectations arising from representations by unauthorized officers of the public body.

==== Ultra vires representations ====
Expectations are not legitimate when they require a public authority to act in breach of its statutory duty. This applies only when the statutory provisions diametrically conflict with the representation. In other words, the statutory provision will render the courts' fulfilment of the expectation impossible. However, a statutory provision which merely permits, but does not compel the public authority to breach the expectation will not necessarily justify any such breach.

An individual's human rights protected by the Human Rights Act 1998 may occasionally override arguments of legality. In Stretch v United Kingdom (2003), the European Court of Human Rights declared that whether the legality of the authority's action should be ignored will be determined on a case-by-case basis, and in light of proportionality.

==== Statements by unauthorized officers ====
For an expectation to be legitimate, the individual making the representation must have actual or apparent authority to make it on the behalf of the public authority. Such representations would prima facie bind the public authority. Although representations made by an individual with apparent authority may have been made outside his or her powers, they are nevertheless legitimate as they fall within the scope of powers of the particular public body.

Representations will not lead to legitimate expectations when delegation of such power to the individual making the representation is forbidden by statute, or where the individual making the representation lacks actual or apparent authority. In the latter case, the applicant's expectation will lack legitimacy and thus would prima facie not be binding on the public authority.

=== Reasonableness of the expectation ===
In deciding whether the expectation held by the aggrieved party is legitimate, the courts will consider whether the expectation was, in all circumstances, reasonable when it was formed. The reasonableness test requires the court to assess the behaviour of the parties in the events which occurred prior to the making of the alleged representation, according to the following criteria:

- The representation may arise from either the words used or the behaviour of the parties.
- The aggrieved party must not have utilized fraudulent measures to obtain the representation, and must have disclosed all relevant information.
- The representation must usually be "clear, unambiguous and devoid of all relevant qualification". However, this is not required to establish the existence of a legitimate expectation if the public authority acted so unfairly such that its conduct constituted an abuse of power.

The number of individuals affected may play a part, as courts have found a legitimate expectation to exist when the representation was "pressing and focused" and made to a small group of individuals. On the other hand, courts rarely find the existence of a legitimate expectation when the representation was one made in general terms to a large and diverse group of individuals. However, it may be noted that there are instances where an individual has successfully sought relief on behalf of a sizeable group of people.

=== Reliance and detriment as consideration for legitimacy ===
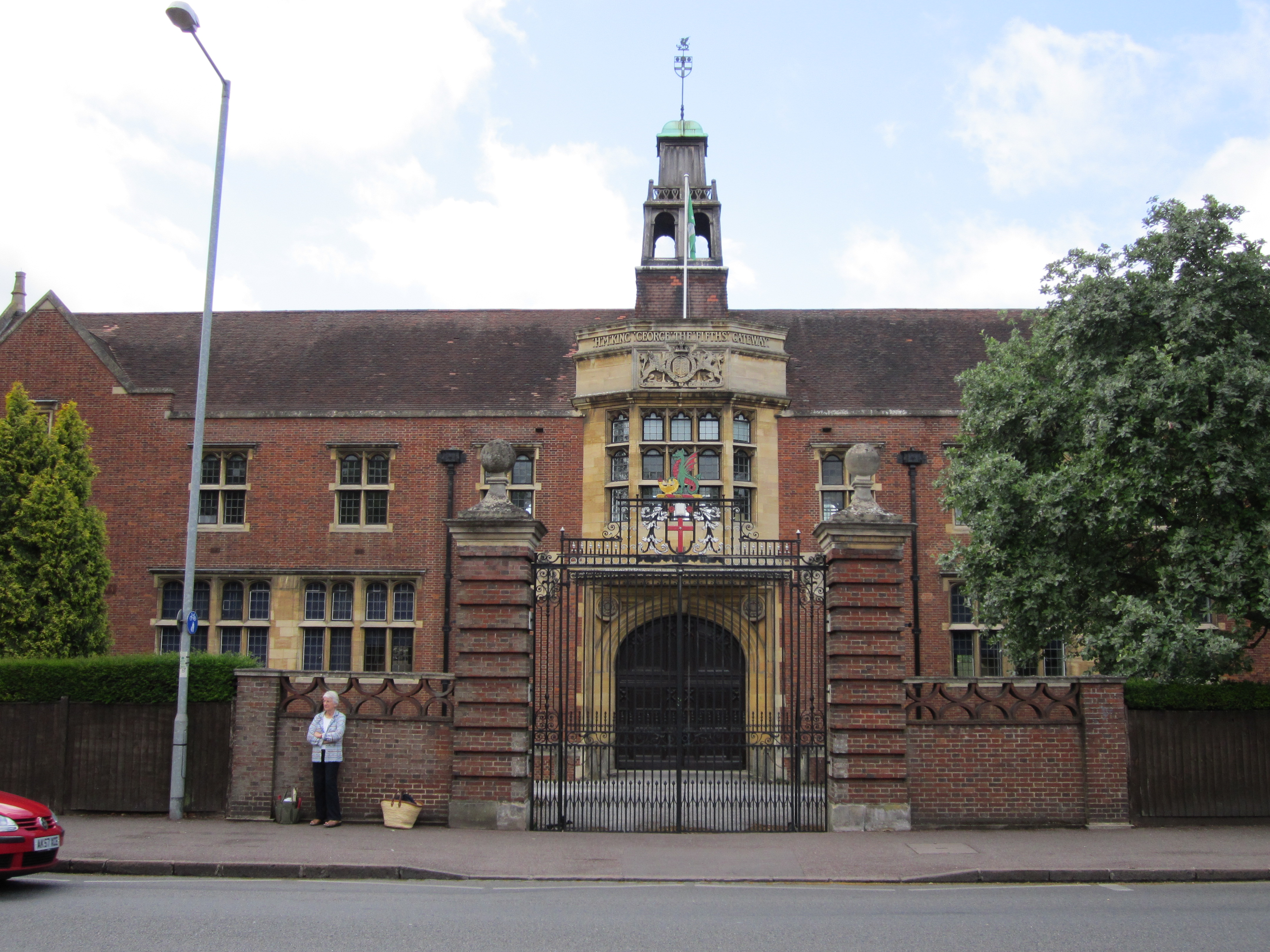
The H.M. King George the Fifth Gateway of The Leys School in Cambridge, UK. In a 1999 case, ex parte Begbie, a schoolgirl admitted to the school under a state-funded assisted places scheme claimed her legitimate expectation had been breached after the scheme was cancelled. In its judgment, the Court of Appeal of England and Wales noted it is unnecessary for applicants to show they have relied on public bodies' representations to their detriment to establish legitimate expectations. However, where detrimental reliance is absent, courts will only protect a legitimate expectation in exceptional cases.

Courts have considered the applicant's reliance on the representation as a relevant consideration when determining the existence of a legitimate expectation. The role of reliance may be better assessed by distinguishing between "weak reliance" and "strong reliance". Weak reliance occurs when the applicant was made aware of and merely believed in the truth of the representation. Strong reliance, on the other hand, occurs where the applicant acted upon the representation and consequently faced detriment.

Weak reliance is not required where the authority failed to apply the general policy at the time to the individual case at hand. This exception is prompted by the overriding imperative of equality. Thus, the applicant need not have had detailed knowledge or the existence of the policy in order for a legitimate expectation to arise where the public authority had departed from the existing policy in deciding the individual case.

Strong reliance by the applicant is not compulsory to prove the existence of a legitimate expectation. In spite of this, Lord Justice of Appeal Peter Gibson stated in R v Secretary of State for Education and Employment, ex parte Begbie (1999) that "it would be wrong to understate the significance of reliance in this area of the law". Detrimental reliance is not indicative of whether the court should protect an applicant's legitimate expectation but usually furthers an applicant's case, and it is only in exceptional cases where courts will protect a legitimate expectation in which detrimental reliance is absent.

== Procedural legitimate expectations ==
A procedural legitimate expectation by an individual or group rests on the presumption that the decision-maker will follow a certain procedure in advance of a decision being taken. This expectation can manifest in various ways, such as the expectation of being consulted; of an inquiry being held; of a fair hearing; and of being allowed time to make representations, especially where the applicant is seeking to persuade an authority to depart from a lawfully established policy. The courts' protection of procedural legitimate expectations reinforces the notion that administrative decision-makers should be bound by certain representations which they make to individuals who stand to be affected by their decisions.

Rooted in the principle of natural justice, procedural legitimate expectation protects procedural interests of the individual in public law. Although procedural expectations by applicants may manifest in various forms, they are all aspects of the "right to a hearing", which an individual affected by a decision enjoys. The UK courts developed this doctrine largely to ensure that the rules of natural justice are observed, to encourage good administration and prevent abuses by decision-makers.

=== Development of procedural protection ===
A key step in the development of procedural legitimate expectation was the observation of Lord Fraser of Tullybelton in Attorney-General of Hong Kong v. Ng Yuen Shiu (1983) that "when a public authority has promised to follow a certain procedure, it is in the interest of good administration that it should act fairly and should implement its promise, so long as implementation does not interfere with its statutory duty".

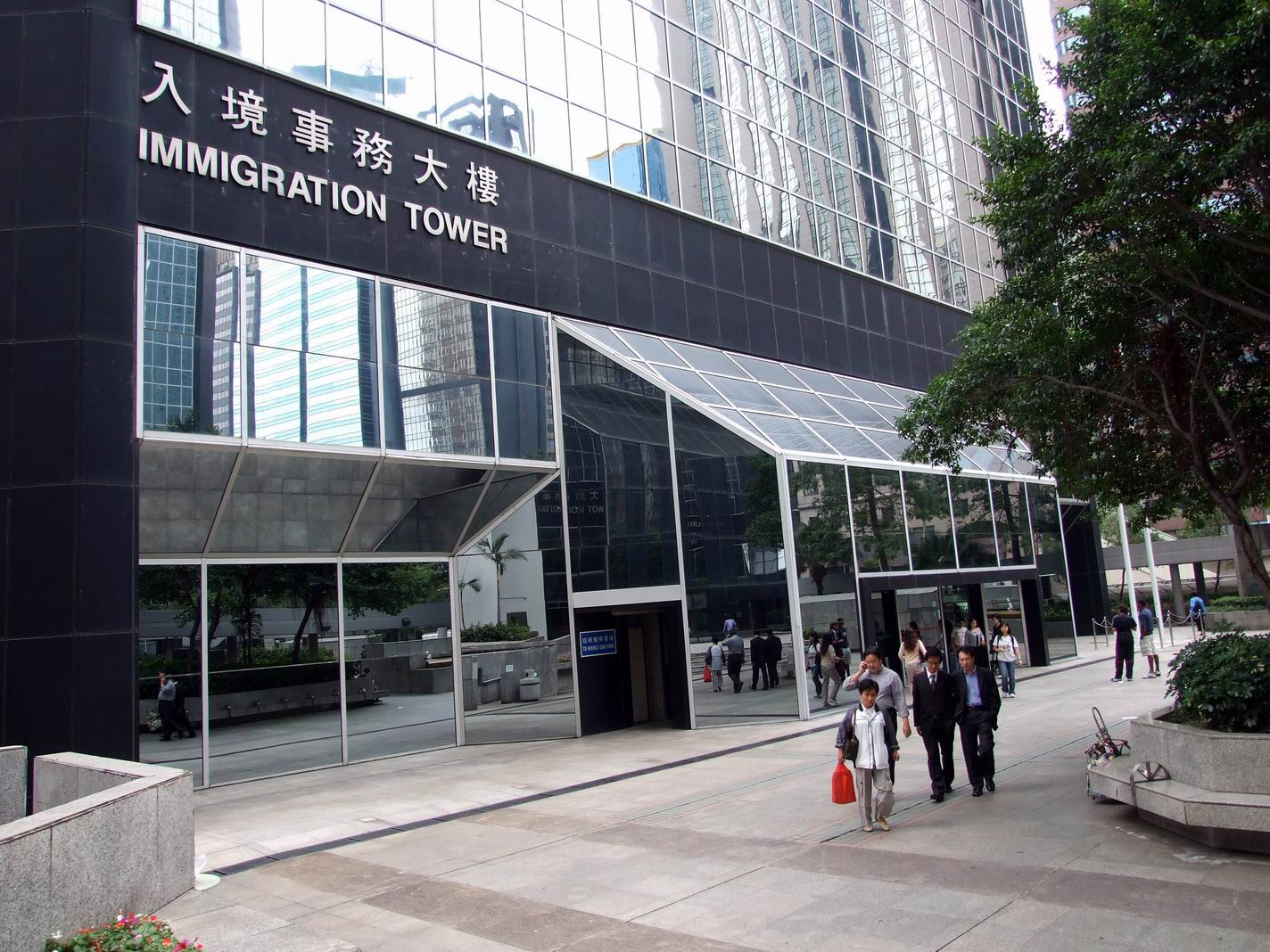
Immigration Tower, Hong Kong. In a 1983 case, Attorney-General of Hong Kong v Ng Yuen Shiu, the Privy Council held it was a breach of a procedural legitimate expectation for the Director of Immigration not to fulfil an undertaking to give an illegal immigrant a chance to make representations before deciding to deport him.

Despite initial resistance to recognition of this doctrine by the courts, the landmark GCHQ case firmly established procedural protection of legitimate expectations. In the case, strikes by civil servants at the Government Communications Headquarters had destabilized operations and were seen as a threat to national security. The Government of the United Kingdom took swift action to limit the rights of GCHQ employees to join unions, permitting them only to belong to an approved departmental staff association. The applicant organization challenged this decision by arguing that it should have been consulted because of a long-standing practice of doing so. In his judgment, Lord Fraser regarded the term legitimate as synonymous to "reasonable" and identified two ways in which a legitimate expectation could arise, namely, "either from an express promise given on behalf of a public authority or from the existence of a regular practice which the claimant can reasonably expect to continue."

While the House of Lords ultimately held that the government action was not unlawful for reasons of national security, it agreed that there was a legitimate expectation on the facts due to the well-established practice of consultation between the government and the trade union on important matters affecting the latter. The court was of the opinion that if not for national security interests, the application to protect a procedural legitimate expectation through judicial review would have been granted.

Protection of procedural legitimate expectations has since been firmly entrenched as one of the court's roles in judicial review. The importance of procedural fairness as enunciated in the GCHQ case is further illustrated by Re Police Association for Northern Ireland's Reference (1990). Applying the principles in the GCHQ case, the High Court of Justice in Northern Ireland held that the Police Association had neither been deprived of a legitimate expectation nor treated unfairly. The Court of Appeal of England and Wales also protected procedural interests by stating that a public authority cannot, without some form of warning, change a long-standing practice that it is aware an individual has acted in the light of and derived a benefit from, in the case of R v Inland Revenue Commissioners, ex parte Unilever plc (1996).

=== Shift to protection of the substantive domain ===
Although the courts' protection of procedural legitimate expectations assured individuals that decision-making processes were guided by fairness and thus the "greater propensity for fairer decisions", in some circumstances a procedural right alone was insufficient for producing a fair outcome as "procedure and substance are intertwined, with procedural rights reinforcing substantive ones, and vice-versa [sic]". The Schmidt case illustrates that the courts' protection of a procedural right inevitably leads to a substantive outcome. The plaintiffs here challenged a decision to refuse renewal of their residence permits on the grounds that they had not been given a hearing before the decision was reached. This argument was rejected as the original permits had been issued for only a certain time, which had since expired. However, Lord Denning, the Master of the Rolls, said that had the plaintiffs' residence permits been revoked before they expired, they "would have a legitimate expectation of being allowed to stay for the permitted time". The Court of Appeal in effect envisaged procedural protection of a substantive expectation of being allowed to stay in the UK.

== Substantive legitimate expectations ==
A substantive legitimate expectation arises where a public body makes a "lawful representation that an individual will receive, or continue to receive, a substantive benefit of some kind".

=== Development of substantive protection ===
In R v Secretary of State for the Home Department, ex parte Hargreaves (1996), the Court of Appeal of England and Wales initially rejected the argument that the courts could perform a substantive review function beyond that permitted by Wednesbury unreasonableness. In contrast, in the earlier case of R v Secretary of State for the Home Department, ex parte Khan (1984), the applicant had argued that the government had unfairly failed to apply the criteria in a government circular that outlined when a family could adopt children living outside the UK. In the Court of Appeal's judgment, Lord Justice of Appeal Hubert Parker surmised that expanding the doctrine of legitimate expectation to protect a substantive element would not necessarily be inconsistent with the principle underlying the doctrine. He stated that "just as [other cases have established that public authorities cannot] resile from an undertaking and change [their] policy without giving a fair hearing so, in principle, the Secretary of State, if he undertakes to allow in persons if certain conditions are satisfied, should not in my view be entitled to resile from that undertaking without affording interested persons a hearing".

This introduced the idea that in certain cases the courts would consider if policy changes were justified even when the affected parties had already been consulted. Effectively, this proposition grants courts the discretion to ascertain whether the public interest is better served by ordering an authority to perform its undertaking than to frustrate it.

Ex parte Khan is also regarded as the first case in which an individual relied on a general policy, as opposed to a specific representation or a policy drawn for a closed class of persons, as the grounds for the expectation of a benefit. While the case mooted the idea of a substantive legitimate expectation, the doctrine was more completely developed in the High Court judgment of R v Ministry of Agriculture, Fisheries and Food, ex parte Hamble (Off-shore) Fisheries Ltd. (1995). Justice Stephen Sedley attempted to widen the Court's protection of legitimate expectations by including "substantive protection of a substantive legitimate expectation". He rejected the proposition that legitimate expectations are limited to procedural grounds by stating: "It is difficult to see why it is any less unfair to frustrate a legitimate expectation that something will or will not be done by the decision-maker than it is to frustrate a legitimate expectation that the applicant will be listened to before the decision-maker decides whether to take a particular step."

When a court protects an applicant's substantive legitimate expectation, it is effectively mandating the outcome of a public body's decision-making process. One criticism is that this undesirably fetters the body's discretion as it will no longer be able to formulate policy without constraints. Nevertheless, it has been acknowledged that protecting substantive legitimate expectations ensures good administration. Consistency and fairness are reinforced in decision-making processes where the administrative power to alter policy is not used to unduly frustrate legitimate expectations. Furthermore, when a public body acts contrary to what it had induced an individual to expect, it may cause that individual severe hardship, especially if he or she relied on the representation and there is no satisfactory alternative to the substance of the promise. The problem is alleviated if the court orders that the individual's legitimate expectation be given effect.

=== Categorical approach ===
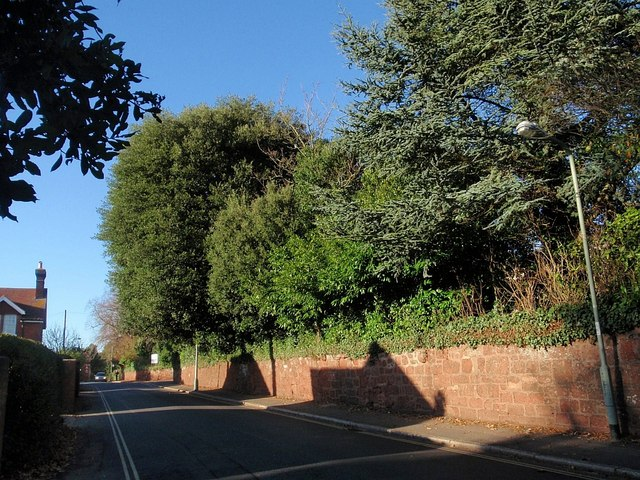
Wonford Road in Exeter, UK. Near this place along the same road is the Royal Devon and Exeter NHS Foundation Trust's Mardon Neuro-Rehabilitation Centre. When it was known as Mardon House, its threatened closure led to a 1999 judgment, ex parte Coughlan, in which the Court of Appeal said a disabled resident's legitimate expectation that she would have a "home for life" there had been breached by a health authority then managing the facility.

Substantive legitimate expectation was definitively recognized as a ground of judicial review in the UK in ex parte Coughlan. The case involved a health authority which resiled from its explicit promise to the disabled applicant that a facility at which she was living would be her "home for life". The Court of Appeal affirmed that the applicant had a legitimate expectation that the authority would keep the facility open, and quashed the authority's decision to close it. The Court stated that there were three categories of legitimate expectations:

- Category (a): substantive legitimate expectation – change of policy. A court may decide that a public authority is only required "to bear in mind its previous policy or other representation, giving it the weight it thinks right, but no more, before deciding whether to change course". In this type of case, which involves a change of policy by the authority, the court can only review the decision on the grounds of Wednesbury unreasonableness. In other words, it will determine if the decision was rational and whether the authority gave proper weight to the implications of not fulfilling the promise. In ex parte Begbie it was clarified that cases fall into this category where a sizeable part of the population is affected and the change of policy involves "what may inelegantly be called the macro-political field".
- Category (b): procedural legitimate expectation – no consultation. The court may decide that a promise or practice creates a legitimate expectation of being consulted before a certain decision is taken. In this situation, "it is uncontentious that the court itself will require the opportunity for consultation to be given unless there is an overriding reason to resile from it[] ... in which case the court will itself judge the adequacy of the reason advanced for the change of policy, taking into account what fairness requires".
- Category (c): substantive legitimate expectation – promise having the character of a contract. If a lawful promise or practice has "induced a legitimate expectation of a benefit which is substantive, not simply procedural", the court will decide "whether to frustrate that expectation is so unfair that to take a new and different course will amount to an abuse of power". When the expectation is established to be legitimate, "the court will have the task of weighing the requirements of fairness against any overriding interest relied upon for the change of policy". Most cases of this type are likely to be "cases where the expectation is confined to one person or a few people, giving the promise or representation the character of a contract".

=== Proportionality approach ===
Under the categorical approach advocated by ex parte Coughlan, for a substantive legitimate expectation to be protected it had to fit into either category (a) or (c). However, classifying substantive legitimate expectations into distinct categories is difficult in cases where there are overlaps, leading Lord Justice Laws to suggest in ex parte Begbie that the categories mentioned in ex parte Coughlan are not "hermetically sealed". In an obiter dictum in Nadarajah v. Secretary of State for the Home Department (2005), Lord Justice Laws set out a more structured form of merits-based review. He expanded the categorical approach in ex parte Coughlan into a continuum based on proportionality, suggesting that in order for a public body's decision to resile from a legitimate expectation to be lawful, it must be "a proportionate response to a legitimate aim pursued by the public body in the public interest".

By advocating proportionality in the court's approach towards protecting substantive legitimate expectations, Lord Justice Laws effectively paralleled the approach used by the UK courts when considering whether an interference with a right subject to qualifications protected by the European Convention on Human Rights is lawful. Drawing guidance from the Convention, the proportionality test requires (1) that the objective of the action must be sufficiently important to justify limiting a fundamental right; (2) that the action designed to meet the objective must be rationally connected to that objective, and not be arbitrary, unfair or based on irrational considerations; and (3) the means used to impair the right must be no more than is necessary to accomplish the legitimate objective, and the more severe the deleterious effects of an action, the more important the objective must be if the action is to be justified. As the European Convention was given effect in the domestic law of the UK by the Human Rights Act 1998, the proportionality approach resonated with the courts which were familiar in applying the test in cases involving qualified Convention rights across a wide spectrum of factual and policy contexts. For instance, the proportionality approach was applied by Justice Stephen Silber in R. (X) v. Head Teacher and Governors of Y School (2007).

=== Overriding public interest ===
Having determined that the applicant's substantive expectation is legitimate, the court then has to determine whether there is any overriding public interest justifying the public authority's decision to resile from its representation, or whether fairness dictates that the representation should be given effect to.

== Remedies ==
=== Fulfilment of the legitimate expectation ===
When a court establishes that a public authority's decision has breached a legitimate expectation, it may annul the decision and order that the authority fulfil the expectation. A decision is invalidated by the issuance of a quashing order (also known as certiorari), one of the more common prerogative orders, and often results in the issue returning to the original body to be reconsidered afresh. For example, in Ng Yuen Shiu, a representation was made by the Director of Immigration that each illegal entrant to Hong Kong from Macau, of whom the applicant was one, would be interviewed with each case treated on its merits before a decision was made whether to deport the entrant. However, the applicant was not given an opportunity to make any representations. The Director's failure to provide the applicant with this chance was deemed a sufficient ground for quashing the decision. The Court of Appeal of Hong Kong had ordered a prohibition restraining the removal orders from being executed. However, the Privy Council decided that a prohibition was excessive and issued a certiorari instead. It noted that the latter order did not prevent the Director from making a fresh removal order following a fair inquiry at which the applicant had been given an opportunity to explain why he should not be deported.

A quashing order may also be used to protect a substantive legitimate expectation. It sets aside the decision that frustrates the promise made by a public authority to an applicant, thus binding the authority to fulfil its representation. In Ex parte Coughlan, the Court of Appeal of England and Wales held that the applicant had a substantive legitimate expectation for the facility at which she was living to be kept open for the rest of her life, which the health authority was not allowed to frustrate. It therefore upheld the High Court's decision to issue a quashing order to prevent the authority from closing the facility, effectively ensuring that the facility was kept running for the benefit of its residents.

To direct a public body fulfil a legitimate expectation, the court issues a mandatory order (also known as a mandamus). This is a prerogative order which commands a public body to perform a public duty, and is often used to compel public bodies to exercise the powers given to them.

=== Reconsideration of decision ===
In R (Bibi) v Newham London Borough Council (2001), instead of ordering that the public authority fulfil a legitimate expectation that had been breached, the Court of Appeal of England and Wales held that when the decision in question is "informed by social and political value judgments as to priorities of expenditure" it is more appropriate for the authority to make the decision, and the court may order that the authority should merely reconsider its decision, taking into account the person's substantive legitimate expectation.

=== Damages ===
The payment of damages (monetary compensation) by a public authority is relevant to legitimate expectations in two ways. First, if the authority has voluntarily paid damages to an individual for breaching a legitimate expectation, the court could hold that the authority has not abused its power and thus there is no need to compel it to fulfil the expectation. Secondly, it has been suggested that upon finding that the authority has breached a legitimate expectation, instead of ordering the expectation to be given effect, the court could direct that damages be paid. However, a serious difficulty with this proposal is the fact that at present English law does not generally recognize monetary compensation as a remedy for breaches of public law. A person can only obtain damages if he or she also has a parallel cause of action in private law (for example, in the law of contract or tort), and the non-fulfilment of a legitimate expectation is only likely to give rise to such a cause of action on rare occasions. In R. v. Commissioners of Custom and Excise, ex parte F & I Services Ltd. (2001) Justice Sedley referred to the possibility of damages as a remedy, but commented:

That [the existing authorities] do not include damages for abuses of power falling short of m[is]feasance in public office does not necessarily mean that door is closed to them in principle. But the policy implications of such a step are immense, and it may well be that – despite the presence for some years in the rules of a power to award damages on an application for judicial review – a legal entitlement to them cannot now come into being without legislation.

The view has been taken that damages are not a suitable remedy when the loss suffered by an individual cannot be assessed meaningfully, but if they can be quantified then ordering an authority to pay compensation is preferable to insisting that it act in a manner that it regards as not being in the public interest. However, fulfilment of the legitimate expectation should be the primary remedy.

== Legitimate expectations in other jurisdictions ==
=== Australia ===
Besides applying in the UK, the procedural legitimate expectation was approved by the Federal Court of Australia in GTE (Australia) Pty. Ltd. v. Brown (1986). In the case, the Minister of State for Administrative Services, acting on behalf of the Minister of State for Industry and Commerce, imposed anti-dumping duties on the applicant. The applicant brought legal proceedings claiming that the authorities had denied it natural justice by failing to comply with a promise to provide an opportunity for a hearing towards the close of the investigation on whether the duties should be levied, and by departing from certain procedures. Applying Ng Yuen Shiu and the GCHQ case, the Court agreed that the applicant's legitimate expectation had been frustrated by the failure to conduct a hearing and that it had been unfair for the authorities not to follow the procedures.

On the other hand, strong doubts have been expressed about substantive legitimate expectations. In Re Minister for Immigration and Multicultural Affairs; Ex parte Lam (2003), the High Court of Australia said that the reasoning in ex parte Coughlan violated the separation of powers doctrine by overextending the reach of judicial power provided for in section 75(v) of the Constitution of Australia. In its opinion, the balancing act employed in ex parte Coughlan should be left to the executive and falls beyond the province of the courts.

=== Singapore ===
In Singapore, the High Court has recognized that a representation that a consultation will be held before a public authority makes a decision can give rise to a procedural legitimate expectation, though no applicant has successfully established the existence of such an expectation yet.

As for the protection of substantive legitimate expectations, in Abdul Nasir bin Amer Hamsah v. Public Prosecutor (1997), a criminal case, the Court of Appeal relied on the concept of legitimate expectations to support the overruling of an incorrect legal principle prospectively – with effect from the date of the judgment – rather than retrospectively which would be the usual effect of a judgment. It stated that "certain legitimate expectations could, in certain circumstances, be deserving of protection, even though they did not acquire the force of a legal right", Although it emphasized it was not considering whether the Prisons Department was prevented from carrying out its duties by a legitimate expectation. In UDL Marine (Singapore) Pte. Ltd. v. Jurong Town Corp. (2011), the High Court doubted whether the doctrine of substantive legitimate expectation is part of Singapore law, but did not discuss the matter fully as neither the respondent nor the Attorney-General had made submissions on the issue.

Subsequently, in Chiu Teng @ Kallang Pte. Ltd. v. Singapore Land Authority (2013), a differently constituted High Court held that substantive legitimate expectation should be recognized as a ground of judicial review if the following conditions are satisfied:

(a) The applicant must prove that the statement or representation made by the public authority was unequivocal and unqualified;

(i) if the statement or representation is open to more than one natural interpretation, the interpretation applied by the public authority will be adopted; and
(ii) the presence of a disclaimer or non-reliance clause would cause the statement or representation to be qualified.

(b) The applicant must prove the statement or representation was made by someone with actual or ostensible authority to do so on behalf of the public authority.
(c) The applicant must prove that the statement or representation was made to him or to a class of persons to which he clearly belongs. (d) The applicant must prove that it was reasonable for him to rely on the statement or representation in the circumstances of his case:

(i) if the applicant knew that the statement or representation was made in error and chose to capitalise on the error, he will not be entitled to any relief;
(ii) similarly, if he suspected that the statement or representation was made in error and chose not to seek clarification when he could have done so, he will not be entitled to any relief;
(iii) if there is reason and opportunity to make enquiries and the applicant did not, he will not be entitled to any relief.

(e) The applicant must prove that he did rely on the statement or representation and that he suffered a detriment as a result.
(f) Even if all the above requirements are met, the court should nevertheless not grant relief if:

(i) giving effect to the statement or representation will result in a breach of the law or the State’s international obligations;
(ii) giving effect to the statement or representation will infringe the accrued rights of some member of the public;
(iii) the public authority can show an overriding national or public interest which justifies the frustration of the applicant's expectation.

=== Bangladesh ===
Judicial precedents have developed the doctrine of legitimate expectation in Bangladesh since 1987. The criteria of the doctrine was restated in Golam Mustafa v. Bangladesh, which is described in the following.

1. If there is a promise by the authority expressed either by their representations or conducts.
2. The decision of the authority was arbitrary or unreasonable within the Wednesbury principle.
3. There was a failure on the part of the concerned authority to act fairly in taking the decision.
4. The expectation to be crystallized into a legitimate one, must be based on clear facts and circumstances leading to a definite expectation and not a mere anticipation or a wish or hope and also must be reasonable in the circumstances.
5. Judicial review may allow such a legitimate expectation and quash the impugned decision even in the absence of a strict legal right unless there is an overriding public interest to defeat such an expectation.

=== European Patent Office ===
The European Patent Office (EPO) also applies the "principle of the protection of legitimate expectations", in that "measures taken by the EPO should not violate the reasonable expectations of parties to [the] proceedings" before the EPO.

== See also ==
- Legal certainty
- General principles of European Union law#Legitimate expectation
