= Padfield v Minister of Agriculture =

1968 UK constitutional law case

Padfield v Minister of Agriculture, Fisheries and Food
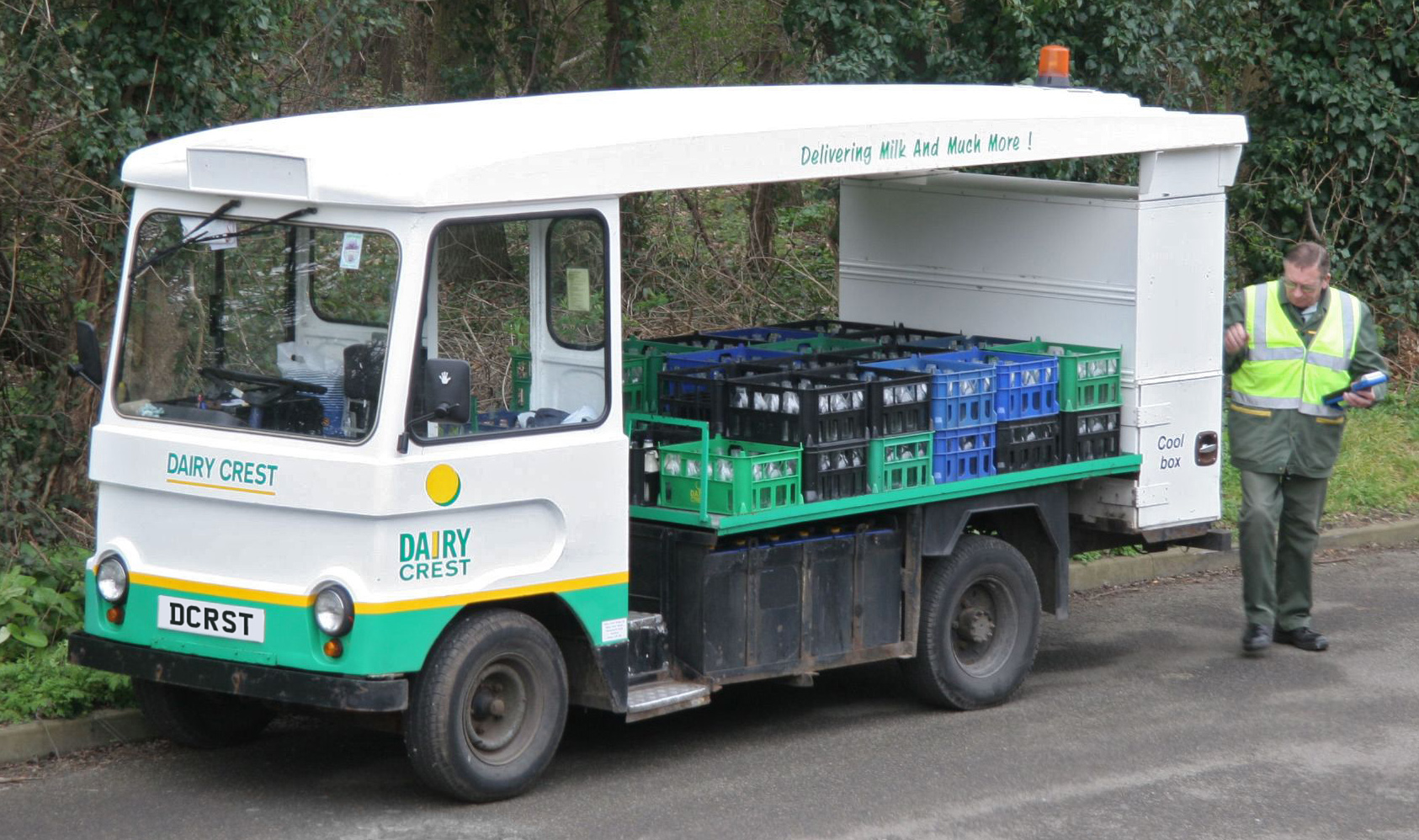
- Court: House of Lords
- Full case name: R (on the application of Padfield and others) v Minister of Agriculture, Fisheries and Food and others
- Decided: 1968
- Citations: [1968] UKHL 1, [1968] AC 997

Court membership
- Judges sitting: Lord Reid; Lord Morris of Borth-y-Gest; Lord Hodson; Lord Pearce; Lord Upjohn

Case opinions
- A minister's discretion to refuse an investigation was subject to judicial review where a refusal would frustrate the policy of an Act.

Keywords
- Judicial review

Padfield v Minister of Agriculture, Fisheries and Food [1968] UKHL 1 is a United Kingdom administrative law case, concerning judicial review.

== Facts ==
Padfield and other milk producers in the South East Region argued they should get more milk subsidies to reflect growing transport costs, and applied to court to compel the minister to appoint an investigation.

The Agricultural Marketing Act 1958 section 19 said a committee of the Milk Marketing Board can investigate "if the Minister so directs" after a complaint on a scheme's operation if it cannot be considered by a consumers' committee (subsection 3(b)), and if it reports a scheme is "contrary to the interests of consumers of the regulated products" or "any persons affected by the scheme" and is "not in the public interest" the minister can amend the scheme, revoke it or direct the board to rectify it (subsection 6).

There were eleven milk regions with different prices for milk, fixed depending on costs of transporting milk from producers to consumers. All milk producers had to sell their milk to the Milk Marketing Board. Differentials had been fixed a few years earlier and transport costs had changed.

The SE region argued the difference between it and the Far Western Region should be altered: this would incidentally affect other regions. Board members were elected by individual regions, so it was impossible for SE producers to get a majority for their proposals.

They asked the Minister of Agriculture, Fisheries and Food (Fred Peart) to appoint a committee of investigation, but he refused. They requested mandamus (specifically, a court order requiring the Minister to appoint the Committee).

== Judgment ==
=== Court of Appeal ===
Diplock LJ and Russell LJ held the minister's discretion could not be challenged. Lord Denning MR dissented.

=== House of Lords ===
The House of Lords, reversing the Court of Appeal, held that a minister's discretion to refuse an investigation was subject to judicial review where a refusal would frustrate the policy of an Act. An order should be made to direct the minister to consider the complaint.

Lord Reid said:

[The] policy and objects of the Act must be determined by construing the Act as a whole, and construction is always a matter of law for the court. In a matter of this kind it is not possible to draw a hard and fast line, but if the Minister, by reason of his having misconstrued the Act or for any other reason, so uses his discretion as to thwart or run counter to the policy and objects of the Act, then our law would be very defective if persons aggrieved were not entitled to the protection of the court.

Lord Upjohn said that if the minister

does not give any reason for his decision it may be ... that a court may be at liberty to come to the conclusion that he had no good reason for reaching that conclusion and order a prerogative writ to issue accordingly.

Lord Morris of Borth-y-Gest dissented.

== See also ==
- United Kingdom constitutional law
