= R (Coughlan) v North and East Devon HA =

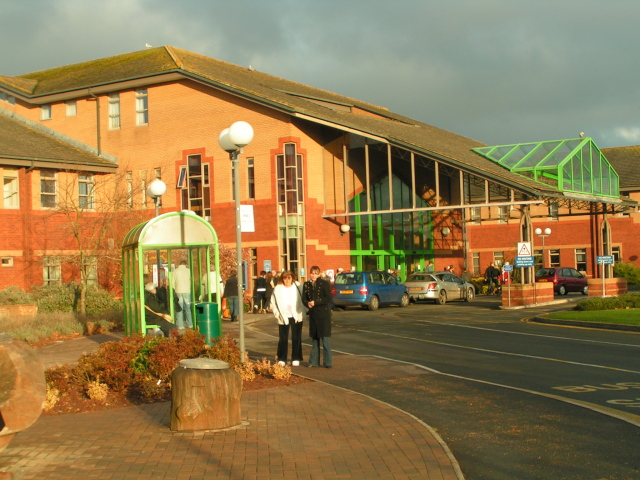
- Royal Devon and Exeter Hospital
- Court: Court of Appeal
- Citation: [1999] EWCA Civ 1871

Keywords
- Health

R (Coughlan) v North and East Devon Health Authority [1999] EWCA Civ 1871 is a UK enterprise law case, concerning health care in the UK.

== Facts ==
Miss Coughlan claimed she should be able to remain at Mardon House, Exeter, purpose built for her and seven others with severe disabilities. After a 1971 road traffic accident, she became tetraplegic, needing constant care. Devon HA decided it should be closed in 1996, although she had been assured before it was a ‘home for life’. The Health Authority argued Mardon House had become ‘a prohibitively expensive white elephant’ which ‘left fewer resources available for other services’.

== Judgment ==
The Court of Appeal held there was a legitimate expectation to fair treatment, with a substantive benefit of the ‘home for life’. Frustrating the expectation would be an abuse of power. However the duty to promote health, in statute, was not a duty to ensure the service was comprehensive.

Lord Woolf MR said that the failure to keep the home open was ‘equivalent to a breach of contract in private law’. He said the following.

... the decision to move Miss Coughlan against her will and in breach of the health authority’s own promise was in the circumstances unfair. It was unfair because it frustrated her legitimate expectation of having a home for life in Mardon House.... The truth is that, while [the Secretary of State] has the duty to continue to promote a comprehensive free health service and he must never, in making a decision under section 3, disregard that duty, a comprehensive health service may never, for human financial and other resource reasons, be achievable.

ECHR article 8 was also discussed.

== See also ==
- United Kingdom enterprise law
