= R v Secretary of State for the Home Department, ex parte Doody =

UK court case regarding reasons for administrative decisions

R v Secretary of State for the Home Department, ex parte Doody [1993] UKHL 8, [1994] 1 AC 531 was an important UK constitutional law case concerning applications for judicial review.

== Facts ==
Four prisoners, Stephen Doody, John David Pierson, Elfed Wayne Smart and Kenneth Pegg, serving mandatory life sentences, requested judicial review after the Home Secretary refused to release them after serving their minimum terms, but gave no reason for the decision. Under common law, there is no duty to give reasons for decisions; however, this case is one of the exceptions.

== Judgment ==
Lord Mustill judged that the Home Secretary must give reasons for their decision. He argued that decisions made using a statutory power must be reached fairly, because all statutory powers are granted with the implicit assumption that they will be wielded fairly. As a result, he concluded it will often be necessary to allow a person to make representations, and therefore to allow them to know what they are responding to, they must be permitted to hear the reason they are having to make the representations at all.

What does fairness require in the present case? My Lords, I think it unnecessary to refer by name or to quote from, any of the often-cited authorities in which the courts have explained what is essentially an intuitive judgment. They are far too well known. From them, I derive that:-

1. Where an Act of Parliament confers an administrative power there is a presumption that it will be exercised in a manner which is fair in all the circumstances.
2. The standards of fairness are not immutable. They may change with the passage of time, both in the general and in their application to decisions of a particular type.
3. The principles of fairness are not to be applied by rote identically in every situation. What fairness demands is dependent on the context of the decision, and this is to be taken into account in all its aspects.
4. An essential feature of the context is the statute which creates the discretion, as regards both its language and the shape of the legal and administrative system within which the decision is taken.
5. Fairness will very often require that a person who may be adversely affected by the decision will have an opportunity to make representations on his own behalf either before the decision is taken with a view to producing a favourable result; or after it is taken, with a view to procuring its modification; or both.
6. Since the person affected usually cannot make worthwhile representations without knowing what factors may weigh against his interests fairness will very often require that he is informed of the gist of the case which he has to answer.
  — Lord Mustill

== See also ==
- Judicial review
