= Matadeen v Pointu =

Constitutional court case in Mauritius

- Court: Judicial Committee of the Privy Council
- Citations: [1998] UKPC 9, [1999] 1 AC 98

Case history
- Prior action: Supreme Court of Mauritius

Case opinions
- Lord Hoffmann

Keywords
- Equality, education, discrimination

Matadeen v Pointu [1998] UKPC 9 is a constitutional law decision of the Judicial Committee of the Privy Council on appeal from the Supreme Court of Mauritius. The case is relevant for English administrative law and concerns equal rights and protection under a constitution.

== Facts ==
Mauritian children sat an annual Certification of Primary Education in English, French, maths and environment, to determine their secondary school. Under authority to make examination regulations granted by Mauritius Examinations Syndicate Act 1984 s 4(a), in March 1995 the Minister changed this to include an optional fifth paper in an oriental language, and candidates who did that would have the best two grades considered out of the three languages. Parents of children due for exams in 1995 and 1996 argued the Ministers actions discriminated against their children, compared to those who had already happened to follow a course of study in an oriental language (i.e. on grounds of whether oriental languages were studied).

The Supreme Court of Mauritius held that the Minister’s actions, because of short notice, did violate the right to equality in the Constitution ss 1 and 3 (protection of the law, and other rights and freedoms), having regard to the Declaration of the Rights of Man 1793 and the International Covenant on Civil and Political Rights, art. 26. There was no objective justification, given the short notice.

== Advice ==
The Privy Council advised that a true construction of the Mauritian Constitution made the right to anti-discrimination limited to just a few grounds in section 16, and for others, it was a matter for the legislature, the minister, or other public body. There was no general, free standing equality clause. Although the French Declaration was a legitimate aid, that could not curtail explicit powers of Parliament, and there was nothing in the ICCPR which helped either, in absence of a general equality clause.

Lord Hoffmann delivered the advice.

As a formulation of the principle of equality, the court cited Rault J. in Police v. Rose [1976] M.R. 79, 81: "Equality before the law requires that persons should be uniformly treated, unless there is some valid reason to treat them differently." Their Lordships do not doubt that such a principle is one of the building blocks of democracy and necessarily permeates any democratic constitution. Indeed, their Lordships would go further and say that treating like cases alike and unlike cases differently is a general axiom of rational behaviour. It is, for example, frequently invoked by the courts in proceedings for judicial review as a ground for holding some administrative act to have been irrational: see Professor Jeffrey Jowell Q.C., "Is Equality a Constitutional Principle?" (1994) 7 C.L.P. 1, 12-14 and de Smith, Woolf and Jowell, Judicial Review of Administrative Action, 5th ed. (1995), pp. 576-582, paras. 13-036 to 13-045.

But the very banality of the principle must suggest a doubt as to whether merely to state it can provide an answer to the kind of problem which arises in this case. Of course persons should be uniformly treated, unless there is some valid reason to treat them differently. But what counts as a valid reason for treating them differently? And, perhaps more important, who is to decide whether the reason is valid or not? Must it always be the courts? The reasons for not treating people uniformly often involve, as they do in this case, questions of social policy on which views may differ. These are questions which the elected representatives of the people have some claim to decide for themselves. The fact that equality of treatment is a general principle of rational behaviour does not entail that it should necessarily be a justiciable principle - that it should always be the judges who have the last word on whether the principle has been observed. In this, as in other areas of constitutional law, sonorous judicial statements of uncontroversial principle often conceal the real problem, which is to mark out the boundary between the powers of the judiciary, the legislature and the executive in deciding how that principle is to be applied.

A self-confident democracy may feel that it can give the last word, even in respect of the most fundamental rights, to the popularly elected organs of its constitution. The United Kingdom has traditionally done so; perhaps not always to universal satisfaction, but certainly without forfeiting its title to be a democracy. A generous power of judicial review of legislative action is not therefore of the essence of a democracy. Different societies may reach different solutions.

The United Kingdom theory of the sovereignty of Parliament is however an extreme case. The difficulty about it, as experience in many countries has shown, is that certain fundamental rights need to be protected against being overridden by the majority. No one has yet thought of a better form of protection than by entrenching them in a written constitution enforced by independent judges. Even the United Kingdom is to adopt a modified form of judicial review of statutes by its incorporation of the European Convention. Judge Learned Hand, who was in principle opposed to the power of the Supreme Court to annul Acts of Congress, acknowledged in "The Bill of Rights," Oliver Wendell Holmes Lectures 1958, p. 69 that in this matter his opponents "have the better argument so far as concerns free speech:"

"The most important issues here arise where a majority of the voters are hostile, often bitterly hostile, to the dissidents against whom the statute is directed; and legislatures are more likely than courts to repress what ought to be free."

In many countries, therefore, the constitution deliberately places certain rights out of reach of being overridden even by majority decision and confers upon the courts the power to decide whether the protected right has been infringed. The Constitution of Mauritius clearly follows this pattern.

It by no means follows, however, that the rights which are constitutionally protected and subject to judicial review include a general justiciable principle of equality. The arguments are not all one way. In the United States, the interpretation of the equal treatment clause of the Fourteenth Amendment as a proposition "majestic in its sweep" (Regents of the University of California v. Bakke (1978) 438 U.S. 265, 284, per Powell J.) has had its problems. The need for the courts to avoid usurping the decision making powers of the democratically elected organs of state has led to an elaborate jurisprudence which distinguishes between various grounds of discrimination, treating some (such as race) as "suspect" and requiring a high (some would say unsurmountable) degree of justification; others (such as age) as subject to a much more relaxed "rational basis" test (see Massachusetts Board of Retirement v. Murgia (1976) 427 U.S. 307) and still others as subject to an "intermediate" form of scrutiny. The allocation of different forms of "classification" to the three categories is worked out on a case by case basis which is highly productive of litigation.

Their Lordships think that the framers of a democratic constitution could reasonably take the view that they should entrench the protection of the individual against discrimination only on a limited number of grounds and leave the decision as to whether legitimate justification exists for other forms of discrimination or classification to majority decision in Parliament. There is no reason why a democratic constitution should not express a compromise which imitates neither the unlimited sovereignty of the United Kingdom Parliament nor the broad powers of judicial review of the Supreme Court of the United States. Instead of leaving it to the courts to categorise forms of discrimination on a case by case basis and to concede varying degrees of autonomy to Parliament only as a matter of comity to the legislative branch of government, the constitution itself may identify those forms of discrimination which need to be protected by judicial review against being overridden by majority decision.

The problem was analysed by the Australian Constitutional Commission in its final report in 1988. The commission concluded, vol. I, p. 546, para. 9.481:

"notwithstanding the views expressed in some of the submissions, we believe that, having regard to the relevant experience in the United States and Canada, it is preferable to enumerate in the Constitution an exhaustive list of grounds on which discrimination is prohibited. This would avoid the kind of problems the courts have faced in Canada in recent years when trying to establish the relationship between the enumerated and the unenumerated grounds of non-discrimination. It would also avoid the establishment of what many critics of the United States equal protection clause see as an arbitrary hierarchy of rights and interests. Another important consideration is that the recommendation we propose would substantially curtail the volume of litigation which statements of these rights tend to generate."

Section 19 of the New Zealand Bill of Rights Act 1990 conferred the right to freedom from discrimination on a limited number of enumerated grounds and, although the grounds were substantially extended by the Human Rights Act 1993, it remains a list of specific grounds and not a general principle of equality such as the Fourteenth Amendment.

In Union of Campement Site Owners and Lessees v. Government of Mauritius [1984] M.R. 100, 107 Lallah Ag. C.J. said:

". . . Constitutions are formulated in different terms and must each be read within its own particular context and framework. The American and Indian Constitutions were drafted in a different age and have tended, particularly with regard to fundamental freedoms of the individual and to a greater extent than more modern Constitutions, to make broad and wide ranging formulations which have necessitated a number of amendments and specific derogations or else have required recourse to implied concepts of eminent domain or police powers in order to keep literal interpretations of individual rights within manageable limits. We should be very cautious, therefore, in importing wholesale into the structure and framework of our Constitution a complete article of the kind that article 14 of the Indian Constitution or the 14th Amendment of the American Constitution are."

Their Lordships consider that these observations, coming as they do from a judge with great experience in the international jurisprudence of human rights, should be borne carefully in mind. It is open to a democratic constitution to entrench a general principle of equality, as in the United States and India; to "entrench" protection against discrimination on specific grounds, as in New Zealand, or to entrench nothing, as in the United Kingdom. In order to discover into which of these categories the Constitution of Mauritius falls, it seems to their Lordships that there is no alternative to reading the Constitution. It is therefore to the language of section 3 that their Lordships next turn.

Lord Browne-Wilkinson, Lord Hope, Lord Clyde, and Gaunt J concurred.

== See also ==
- UK administrative law
- UK constitutional law
- UK public law
