= Wilfrid Greene, 1st Baron Greene =

British judge (1883–1952)

The Right Honourable The Lord Greene OBE MC PC
- Portrait of Lord Greene as Master of the Rolls

Master of the Rolls
- In office 26 April 1937 – 1 June 1949
- Preceded by: The Lord Wright
- Succeeded by: The Lord Evershed

Personal details
- Born: Wilfred Arthur Greene; 30 December 1883 Beckenham, Kent
- Died: 16 April 1952 (aged 68) Dorking, Surrey
- Spouse: Nancy Wright
- Education: Christ Church, Oxford
- Profession: Barrister, judge

Wilfrid Arthur Greene, 1st Baron Greene, (Note: First name spelt Wilfred in some sources) OBE, MC, PC (30 December 1883 – 16 April 1952) was a British lawyer and judge, noted for creating two crucial principles of administrative law, the Wednesbury doctrine and the Carltona doctrine.

== Early life, education and military service ==
Greene was born in Beckenham, Kent, son of Arthur Werguelin Greene, a solicitor, and his wife Katherine Agnes Fooke. He was educated at Westminster School; he was one of the first Roman Catholic pupils to be admitted to the School. He graduated from Christ Church, Oxford in 1906 with a BA; he had the reputation of being "a formidable scholar". He was admitted to Inner Temple in 1908 entitled to practise as a barrister. He married Nancy Wright in 1909. He gained the rank of captain in the service of the 2/1st Battalion, Oxfordshire and Buckinghamshire Light Infantry. He fought in the First World War between 1914 and 1918. He was decorated with the award of the MC in 1918. He was decorated with the award of Cavaliere, Order of the Crown of Italy. He was decorated with the award of Croix de Guerre. He was invested with an OBE in 1919.

== Legal and judicial career ==
Greene was a Lord Justice of Appeal from 1935 to 1937. He served as Master of the Rolls between 1937 and 1949, and subsequently became a Law Lord. On 16 July 1941, he was raised to the peerage as Baron Greene, of Holmbury St Mary in the County of Surrey. The title became extinct on his death in April 1952, aged 68.

Greene in his time was the acknowledged master of administrative law – indeed it is impossible to exaggerate his contribution to the development of this field of law. Despite some refinements, the Wednesbury doctrine of reasonableness remains the benchmark by which courts review decisions of public bodies. Of even greater significance was his enunciation of the Carltona doctrine in Carltona Ltd. v. Commissioners of Public Works [1943] 2 All E.R. 560 that "the duties imposed upon Ministers and the powers given to Ministers are normally exercised under the authority of the Minister by responsible officials of the Department". It may fairly be said that the Carltona doctrine is the legal underpinning for the operation of the civil service in the United Kingdom and Ireland.

In 1941 he chaired a Board of Inquiry into pay in the mining industry, prompted by a series of strikes, and at the urging of Harold Wilson (the future Prime Minister, then serving as a wartime civil servant), who served as secretary to the inquiry, recommended both a pay rise and the establishment of a minimum wage for the industry. Greene, who was not normally thought of as a "political" judge, is said to have remarked cheerfully that his report was the first step towards nationalisation of the coal mines.

== Joldwynds ==
Greene acquired Joldwynds, a country house in Holmbury St Mary designed by Arts and Crafts architect Philip Webb, but demolished it in 1930. He commissioned Oliver Hill to design a new Joldwynds in modernist style, completed in 1932. He also commissioned a house to a design by the modernist Tecton Group, which was built in the grounds of Joldwynds in 1939.

== Honours ==
- Military Cross in 1918.
- OBE in 1919.
- KC in 1922.
- Cavaliere, Order of the Crown of Italy
- Croix de Guerre
- Knight Bachelor in 1935.
- Privy Councillor in 1935.
- Raised to the Peerage in 1941

== Cases ==
- Associated Provincial Picture Houses v Wednesbury Corporation [1948] 1 KB 223
- Re Smith & Fawcett [1942] Ch. 304
- Carltona v Commissioners of Public Works [1943] 2 All. E.R. 580

== Notes ==
Legal offices
| Preceded by The Lord Wright | Master of the Rolls; 1937–1949 | Succeeded by Sir Raymond Evershed |
Peerage of the United Kingdom
| New creation | Baron Greene; 1941–1952 | Extinct |
