= R (Daly) v Secretary of State for the Home Department =

R (Daly) v SS for the Home Department
- Court: UK House of Lords

Keywords
- Searches, right to privacy

R (Daly) v Secretary of State for the Home Department [2001] UKHL 26 is a UK constitutional law case of the House of Lords case on the rights of a prisoner when his cell is searched by prison officers.

== Facts ==
The case concerned whether cell searches contravened a prisoner's right to private correspondence with his solicitor. The case is important for its use of a proportionality test in a judicial review case, a method copied from the jurisprudence of the European Convention on Human Rights.

== Judgment ==
The prisoner's case was accepted.
