= Chief Constable of the North Wales v Evans =

- Court: House of Lords
- Citations: [1982] UKHL 10, [1982] 1 WLR 1155

Keywords
- Judicial review

Chief Constable of the North Wales Police v Evans [1982] UKHL 10 is a UK constitutional law case, concerning judicial review.

== Facts ==
Evans claimed he was unjustly dismissed as a probationary constable. He received good progress reports. The Chief Constable interviewed him and asked him to resign rather than formally firing him on the grounds that Evans (1) married a woman much older than himself, the former mistress of his uncle, which ostensibly might have been a scandal for the force, (2) he was keeping four dogs in a police council house, which had a one dog limit, and (3) Evans and his wife lived a “hippy” lifestyle. Evans argued that if he had been able to choose between his dogs and his career, the dogs would have gone.

== Judgment ==
The House of Lords held the Chief Officer’s discretion under the Police Regulations 1971 was not absolute, but qualified and could only be exercised if the probationer was unfit for office or unlikely to become an efficient constable, in accordance with natural justice. The supposedly adverse factors were never put to Evans. However, an order for mandamus for reinstatement would usurp the Chief Constable’s powers, so declaring the action void was unsatisfactory. Instead, Evans would have a declaration affirming an unlawfully induced resignation and could get damages.

Lord Brightman said the following.

I turn secondly to the proper purpose of the remedy of judicial review, what it is and what it is not. In my opinion the law was correctly stated in the speech of Lord Evershed (at page 96). His was a dissenting judgment but the dissent was not concerned with this point. Lord Evershed referred to "a danger of usurpation of power on the part of the courts... under the pretext of having regard to the principles of natural justice." He added

I do observe again that it is not the decision as such which is liable to review; it is only the circumstances in which the decision was reached, and particularly in such a case as the present the need for giving to the party dismissed an opportunity for putting his case.

Judicial review is concerned, not with the decision, but with the decision-making process. Unless that restriction on the power of the court is observed, the court will in my view, under the guise of preventing the abuse of power, be itself guilty of usurping power.

Lord Hailsham LC, Lord Fraser, Lord Roskill, Lord Bridge gave concurring opinions.

== See also ==
- UK constitutional law
- UK labour law
