= R (Venables and Thompson) v Home Secretary =

- Court: House of Lords
- Citations: [1997] UKHL 25, [1998] AC 407

Keywords
- Health

R v Secretary of State for the Home Department, ex parte Venables and Thompson [1997] UKHL 25 is a UK constitutional law case, concerning the exercise of independent judgement in judicial review.

== Facts ==
Venables and Thompson claimed that the Home Secretary had unlawfully decided not to release them from prison, after they were convicted of murder as children. The Home Secretary took into account public petitions demanding the murderer be imprisoned for life. He refused to take account of their progress and development during detention. He increased the ‘tariff period’ from 10 to 15 years to delay release, and said they should be dealt with on the same basis as adult offenders, where mandatory life sentences were imposed.

== Judgment ==
The House of Lords held by 3 to 2, that the Home Secretary acted unlawfully by taking into account irrelevant considerations (a public petition) and failing to take into account relevant considerations (progress in detention).

Lord Steyn said the following of the Home Secretary.

His legal premise was wrong: the two sentences are different. A sentence of detention during Her Majesty’s pleasure requires the Home Secretary to decide from time to time ... whether detention is still justified. The Home Secretary misunderstood his duty. This misdirection by itself renders his decision unlawful.

== See also ==
- Anthony Anderson (murderer), who successfully challenged the Home Secretary's power to set minimum terms for sentences of life imprisonment
- United Kingdom constitutional law
