= Associated Provincial Picture Houses Ltd v Wednesbury Corporation =

English legal case

Associated Provincial Picture Houses v Wednesbury Corporation
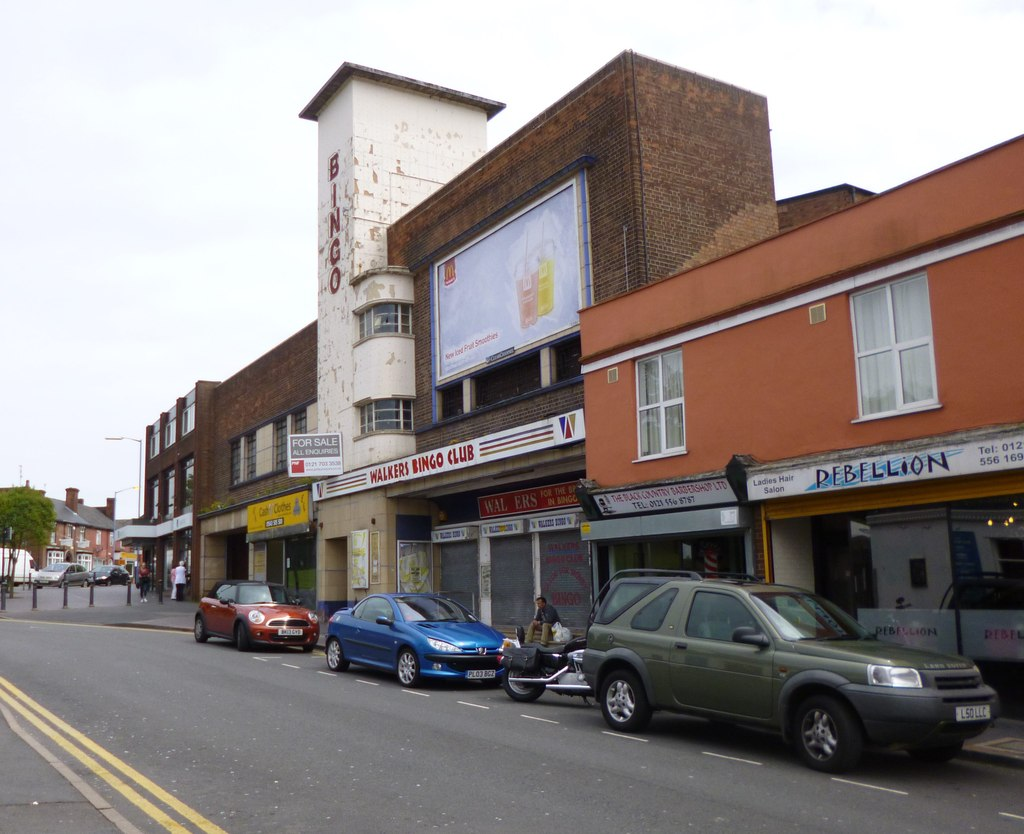
- Former Wednesbury Cinema
- Court: Court of Appeal of England and Wales
- Decided: November 10, 1947
- Citation: [1948] 1 KB 223, [1947] EWCA Civ 1

Court membership
- Judges sitting: Lord Greene, Somervell LJ, Singleton J

Keywords
- Judicial review

Associated Provincial Picture Houses Ltd. v Wednesbury Corporation [1948] 1 KB 223 is an English law case that sets out the standard of unreasonableness in the decision of a public body, which would make it liable to be quashed on judicial review, known as Wednesbury unreasonableness.

The court gave three conditions on which it would intervene to correct a bad administrative decision, including on grounds of its unreasonableness in the special sense later articulated in Council of Civil Service Unions v Minister for the Civil Service by Lord Diplock:

So outrageous in its defiance of logic or accepted moral standards that no sensible person who had applied his mind to the question to be decided could have arrived at it.

== Facts ==
Under the Cinematograph Act 1909, cinemas could be open from Mondays to Saturdays but not on Sundays. The Sunday Entertainments Act 1932 legalised opening cinemas on Sundays by the local licensing authorities "subject to such conditions as the authority may think fit to impose" after a majority vote by the borough.

In 1947, the municipal corporation of Wednesbury in Staffordshire granted to Associated Provincial Picture Houses a licence to operate a cinema, on condition that no children under 15, whether accompanied by an adult or not, were admitted on Sundays. Associated Provincial Picture Houses sought a declaration from the court that this condition in the licence was unacceptable and outside the power of the corporation to impose.

== Judgment ==
The court decided that it had no power to issue a writ of certiorari to quash the decision of the defendant simply because the court disagreed with it. For the court to adopt any remedies against decisions of public bodies such as Wednesbury Corporation, it would have to find that the decision-maker:

1. had given undue relevance to facts that in reality lacked the relevance for being considered in the decision-making process.
2. had not given relevance to facts that were relevant and worthy of being considered in the decision-making process
3. had made a decision that was completely absurd, a decision so unreasonable that no reasonable authority could have possibly made it.

The court ruled that the corporation's conduct was not inappropriate and complied with the standards that had been set out.

As Lord Greene MR said (at 229),

It is true the discretion must be exercised reasonably. Now what does that mean? Lawyers familiar with the phraseology commonly used in relation to exercise of statutory discretions often use the word "unreasonable" in a rather comprehensive sense. It has frequently been used and is frequently used as a general description of the things that must not be done. For instance, a person entrusted with a discretion must, so to speak, direct himself properly in law. He must call his own attention to the matters which he is bound to consider. He must exclude from his consideration matters which are irrelevant to what he has to consider. If he does not obey those rules, he may truly be said, and often is said, to be acting "unreasonably." Similarly, there may be something so absurd that no sensible person could ever dream that it lay within the powers of the authority. Warrington LJ in Short v Poole Corporation [1926] Ch. 66, 90, 91 gave the example of the red-haired teacher, dismissed because she had red hair. That is unreasonable in one sense. In another sense it is taking into consideration extraneous matters. It is so unreasonable that it might almost be described as being done in bad faith; and, in fact, all these things run into one another.

== Significance ==
The test laid down in this case, in all three limbs, is known as "the Wednesbury test". The term "Wednesbury unreasonableness" is used to describe the third limb, of being so unreasonable that no reasonable authority could have decided that way. This case or the principle laid down is cited in United Kingdom courts as a reason for courts to be hesitant to interfere with decisions of administrative law bodies.

In recent times, particularly as a result of the enactment of the Human Rights Act 1998, the judiciary has receded from this strict abstentionist approach, arguing that in certain circumstances it is necessary to undertake a more searching review of administrative decisions. The European Court of Human Rights requires the reviewing court to subject the original decision to "anxious scrutiny" as to whether an administrative measure infringes a Convention right. In order to justify such an intrusion, the Respondents have to show that they pursued a "pressing social need" and that the means employed to achieve this were proportionate to the limitation of the right.

The UK courts have also ruled that an opinion formed by an employer or other contracting body in relation to a contractual matter has to be "reasonable" in the sense in which that expression is used in Associated Provincial Picture Houses Ltd v Wednesbury Corporation: see the decision of the High Court in The Vainqueur José and that of the Supreme Court in Braganza v BP Shipping Limited.

== See also ==
- Comparable concepts:
  - Fundamental justice (Canada and New Zealand)
  - Patently unreasonable (Canada)
  - Chevron deference in the United States, from Chevron U.S.A., Inc. v. Natural Resources Defense Council, Inc. (since overruled), which allowed judicial review of certain decisions only on the ground that they were "arbitrary, capricious and unreasonable"
  - Arbitrary and capricious (United States), the standard for many states
- Due process
- Equity (law), a body of law developed in England separately from common law which allows more flexible remedies
- Re Smith & Fawcett [1942] Ch 304, a company law case dealing with the control of discretion
- Wednesbury unreasonableness in Singapore law
