= Procedural impropriety in Singapore administrative law =

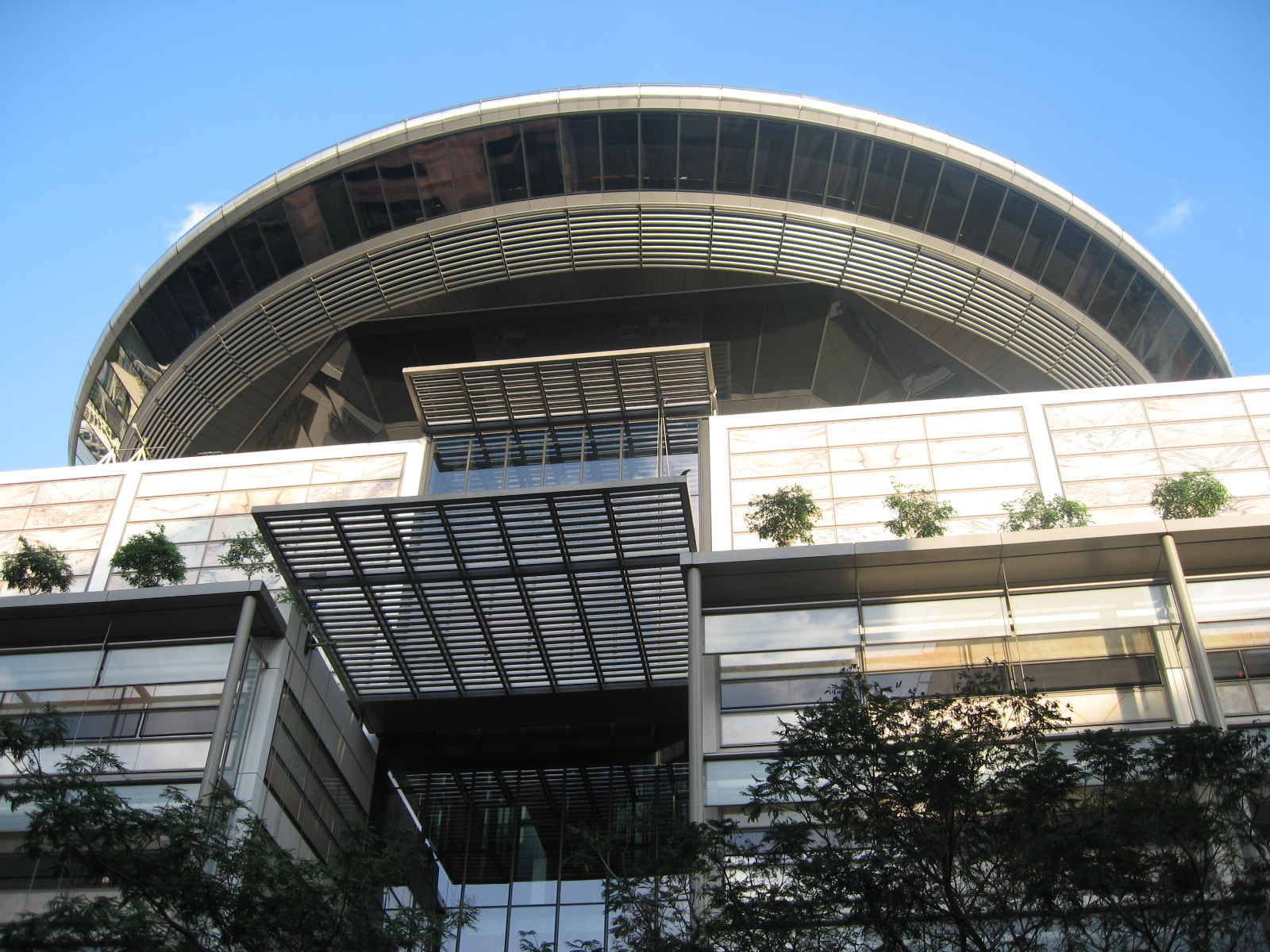
The Supreme Court of Singapore, which is made up of the Court of Appeal and the High Court. One of the broad categories of judicial review recognized by these courts is procedural impropriety.

Procedural impropriety in Singapore administrative law is one of the three broad categories of judicial review, the other two being illegality and irrationality. A public authority commits procedural impropriety if it fails to properly observe either statutory procedural requirements, or common law rules of natural justice and fairness.

The common law rules of natural justice consist of two pillars: impartiality (the rule against bias, or nemo judex in causa sua – "no one should be a judge in his own cause") and fair hearing (the right to be heard, or audi alteram partem – "hear the other side"). The rule against bias divides bias into three categories: actual bias, imputed bias and apparent bias. There are currently two formulations of the test for apparent bias, known as the "real likelihood of bias" test and the "reasonable suspicion of bias" test. Some controversy exists as to whether there is in fact any material difference in the two formulations.

Fair hearings must include sufficient notice to prepare a case, prior knowledge and opportunities to contest, contradict or correct any evidence that will be introduced in the case, and the ability to raise relevant matters before the court. In addition, a fair hearing may also include the rights to legal representation, to cross-examine witnesses, and to be given reasons for a decision; and a presumption in favour of an oral hearing.

The concept of law in provisions of the Constitution of the Republic of Singapore such as Article 9(1) and Article 12(1) includes what are called "fundamental rules of natural justice". According to the Court of Appeal, the content of fundamental rules of natural justice is the same as the common law rules of natural justice, but there is a qualitative difference in how the rules apply. A breach of the former can lead to legislation being struck down on the ground of unconstitutionality. On the other hand, a breach of the latter has the effect of invalidating administrative decisions but cannot affect the validity of legislation.

More recent case law from the UK tends to refer to a duty of public authorities to act fairly rather than to natural justice. One aspect of such a duty is the obligation on authorities in some cases to give effect to procedural legitimate expectations. These are underpinned by the notion that a party that is or will be affected by a decision can expect that he or she will be consulted by the decision-maker before the decision is taken.

== Procedural impropriety ==
The term procedural impropriety was used by Lord Diplock in the House of Lords decision Council of Civil Service Unions v. Minister for the Civil Service ("the GCHQ case", 1984) to explain that a public authority could be acting ultra vires (that is, beyond the power given to it by statute) if it commits a serious procedural error. His Lordship regarded procedural impropriety as one of three broad categories of judicial review, the other two being illegality and irrationality. Procedural impropriety generally encompasses two things: procedural ultra vires, where administrative decisions are challenged because a decision-maker has overlooked or failed to properly observe statutory procedural requirements; and common law rules of natural justice and fairness. United Kingdom administrative law has played a significant role in helping to shape Singapore law in this area, given the weight accorded to UK cases by the courts in Singapore.

Lord Diplock noted in the GCHQ case that "failure by an administrative tribunal to observe procedural rules that are expressly laid down in the legislative instrument by which its jurisdiction is conferred, even where such failure does not involve any denial of natural justice", is a form of procedural impropriety. An example was provided by the Court of Appeal of Singapore in Yong Vui Kong v. Attorney-General (2011). The Court said if there was conclusive evidence that the Cabinet had not complied with the procedure set out in Article 22P(2) of the Constitution of the Republic of Singapore for determining if the President should grant a pardon to a person sentenced to death – for example, if it had not met to consider the issue, or had tossed a coin to decide – this was a breach of law that the courts could intervene to correct.

The common law rules of natural justice consist of two pillars: impartiality (the rule against bias, or nemo judex in causa sua – "no one should be a judge in his own cause") and fair hearing (the right to be heard, or audi alteram partem – "hear the other side"). The rule against bias divides bias into three categories: actual bias, imputed bias and apparent bias. More recent case law from the UK tends to refer to a duty of public authorities to act fairly rather than to natural justice. One aspect of such a duty is the obligation on authorities in some cases to give effect to procedural legitimate expectations. These are underpinned by the notion that a party that is or will be affected by a decision can expect that he or she will be consulted by the decision-maker before the decision is taken.

== Natural justice and the duty to act fairly ==
The rules of natural justice are a set of uncodified common law rules offering procedural safeguards to ensure that decision-makers act according to basic standards of fairness. These rules function to protect both citizens and public officials by restricting the freedom of administrative action and by facilitating better decision-making. The precise requirements of these rules vary according to the context of the case.

The modern development of the principles of natural justice began with the case of Ridge v. Baldwin (1963) in which Lord Reid rejected the artificial distinction established in a line of cases which held that a court could only judicially review decisions that were judicial or quasi-judicial in nature, but not those that were "administrative". Instead, he held that the role of the courts was to assess what a reasonable person would regard as fair procedure in any given circumstances. Following this case, the development of natural justice principles led to a "sliding scale of fairness", with the degree of fairness required varying with the context and circumstances of each case. In Lloyd v. McMahon (1987), Lord Bridge of Harwich outlined some considerations to take into account, including the character of the decision-making body, the kind of decision it has to make, and the statutory or other framework in which it operates. Most importantly, it has to be considered whether the fundamental human rights of an individual will be affected. Where such rights are affected, the common law will require more procedural protection.

However, there are circumstances where the courts accept that procedural protections should be more limited or even placed in abeyance, and this is a function of context. This is especially so in matters of national security where the sensitivity of such matters demands that the courts do not look closely at government decisions to limit procedural rights. In wartime, the case of Liversidge v. Anderson (1941) is regarded to be of great constitutional significance. The House of Lords found that there could be no inquiry into whether there were reasonable grounds for the detention of the appellant as it was a subjective matter for the Home Security to determine, as prescribed by legislation. However, in Lord Atkin's acclaimed dissenting judgment, he refused to endorse this construction of the law. Lord Atkin's judgment is now taken as the correct decision, where every imprisonment is prima facie illegal until justified by the arresting authority. Nonetheless, national security is still an important issue that can and does limit procedural protection in certain cases.

=== The rule against bias ===
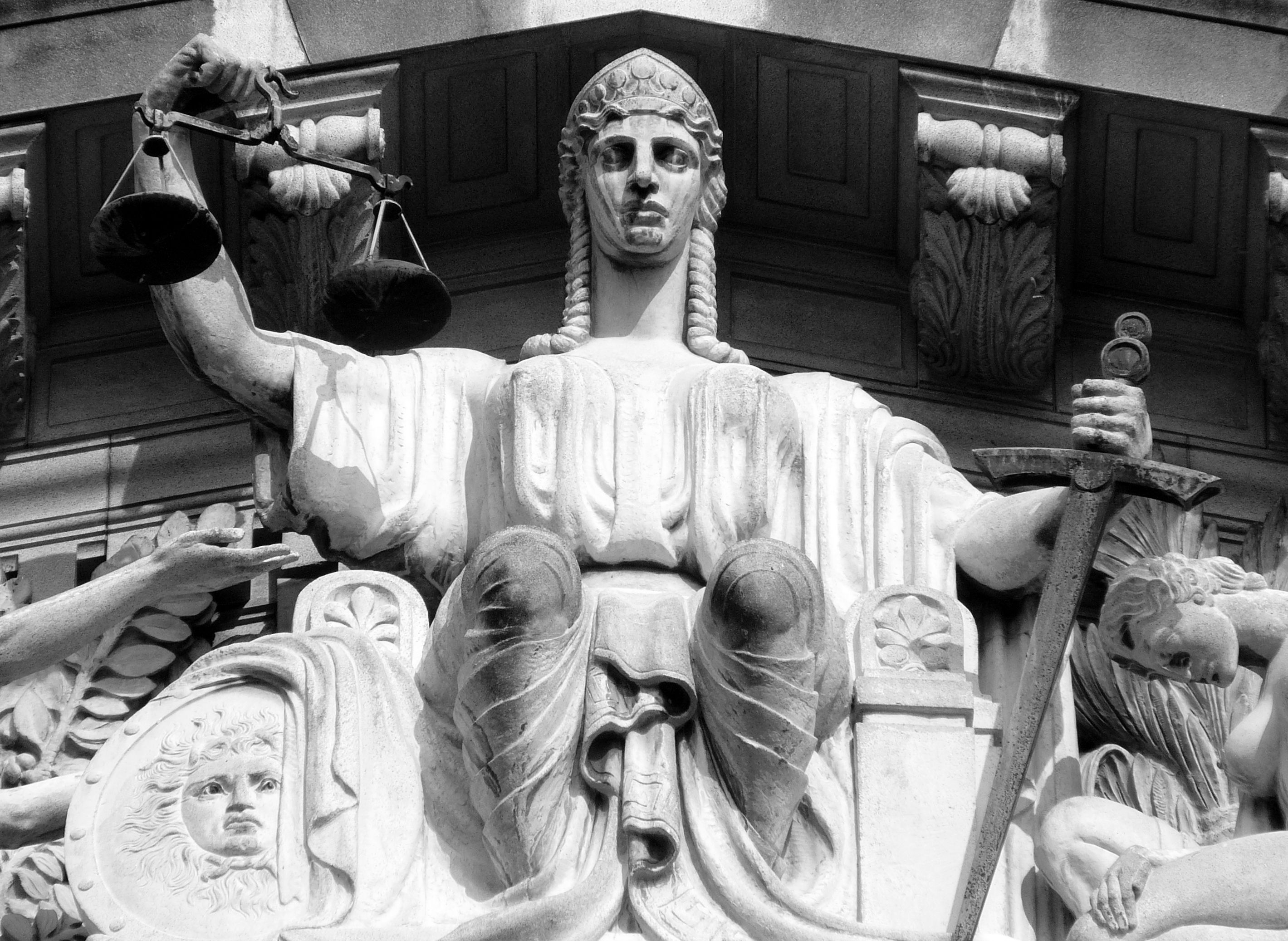
A sculpture of Lady Justice by Rodolfo Nolli in the tympanum of the Old Supreme Court Building. The rule against bias is regarded as one of the two pillars of natural justice.

The common law rule against bias is normally taken to be of stricter application than the right to a fair hearing. It is based on the requirement that for any decision-making process, "it is not merely of some importance, but of fundamental importance that justice should not only be done, but should manifestly and undoubtedly be seen to be done". There are three established categories of bias – actual, imputed and apparent bias. The categories of imputed and apparent bias are not exclusive to each other and may overlap in practice.

==== Actual bias ====
Actual bias is the influence of partiality and prejudice in decision-making, and actual prejudice against or in favour of a party. It must be proved on a balance of probabilities. However, it is understandably difficult to obtain evidence of actual bias. In any case, the common law protects litigants who can discharge the lesser burden of showing a real danger of bias without requiring them to show that such bias actually exists.

In the case of Chee Siok Chin v. Attorney-General (2006), the High Court judge was asked to recuse herself on the grounds of actual bias, due to the fact that during a chambers hearing there had been a short outburst between the counsel for the plaintiffs and the defendants, after which the plaintiffs' counsel had been directed to continue with his submissions. The judge held there was no actual bias whatsoever justifying the recusal application. She further held that judges have to be careful not to accede too readily to suggestions of actual bias by litigants who do not want particular judges to hear their cases, as this would encourage parties to believe that by seeking the disqualification of judges they would have their cases tried by other judges thought more likely to decide the cases in their favour. The "insidious nature" of judge-shopping should not be condoned as it "undermine[s] and weaken[s] the administration of justice".

==== Imputed bias ====
===== Arising from a pecuniary interest =====
Adjudicator with a pecuniary or monetary interest in the matter, no matter how small it is, are automatically disqualified from making the decision. The decision, if made, may be set aside. Thus, in Dimes v. Grand Junction Canal Proprietors (1852), the House of Lords held that the Lord Chancellor, who was a shareholder of one of the companies that was a party to certain legal proceedings he was presiding over, was disqualified from hearing the case. His ruling had to be annulled. This was not because there was a real possibility of bias, but because the situation created a possibility that a reasonable person might suspect the existence of bias, which would taint the fairness of the proceedings.

However, there are clear exceptions to this rule, such as the following:

- Proceedings may continue if the parties are made aware of the adjudicator's interest in them and agree to waive their objections.
- Where there is some special statutory dispensation on the matter.
- All the available adjudicators are affected by the same disqualifying interest and there is no option other than to proceed.
- If the financial interest is very remote and no suspicion of bias could occur to a reasonable person, the decision-maker will not be disqualified.

===== Arising from a non-pecuniary interest =====
In addition to a pecuniary interest, other forms of personal interest that an adjudicator has in a decision may give the impression that of bias. As the High Court stated in Re Singh Kalpanath (1992), a likelihood of bias may arise because an adjudicator (1) has already indicated partisanship by expressing opinions antagonistic or favourable to the parties before him; (2) has made known his views about the merits of the very issue or issues of a similar nature in such a way as to suggest prejudgment; or (3) has a personal relationship with the party or there is close kinship between the adjudicator and a party.

Bias arising out of a non-pecuniary interest can, like a pecuniary interest, result in the automatic disqualification of a judge from hearing a case. In R. v. Bow Street Metropolitan Stipendiary Magistrate, ex parte Pinochet Ugarte (No. 2) (1999), the issue was whether Lord Hoffmann should be regarded as automatically disqualified from hearing an appeal by Augusto Pinochet against his extradition to Spain to stand trial for crimes against humanity. Lord Hoffmann was the Director and Chairperson of Amnesty International Charity Ltd., a company undertaking the aspects of the work of Amnesty International Ltd. which are charitable under UK law. He had no pecuniary interest in the company as he was neither employed nor paid by it, but had carried out fund-raising for it. Amnesty International Ltd. was a party to the case against Pinochet. The House of Lords decided the issue in the affirmative, stating that as the fundamental principle is that a man cannot be a judge in his own cause, there is no good reason in principle for limiting automatic disqualification only to pecuniary interests.

However, any attempt to recuse a judge from hearing a case on the ground of a conflict of interest must be based on credible grounds, and must not be motivated by any extraneous purpose. Otherwise, the rule could become a charter for abuse by manipulative advocates. A judge "would be as wrong to yield to a tenuous or frivolous objection as he would to ignore an objection of substance".

==== Apparent bias ====
There are two formulations of the test for apparent bias. One is the "real likelihood of bias" test, which was applied by Judicial Commissioner Andrew Phang in the High Court judgment of Tang Kin Hwa v. Traditional Chinese Medicine Practitioners Board (2005). In the UK in R. v. Gough (1993), the test was phrased as one involving a "real danger of bias", though Lord Goff of Chieveley who delivered the leading judgment in the case felt there was "no practical distinction" between the two ways of phrasing the test. The other test to establish apparent bias is the "reasonable suspicion of bias" test. This test was approved by the Court of Appeal in Jeyaretnam Joshua Benjamin v. Lee Kuan Yew (1992), and involves asking whether a reasonable and fair-minded person sitting in court and knowing all the relevant facts would have a reasonable suspicion that a fair trial for the litigant concerned is not possible, It was endorsed by a different judge of the High Court, Judicial Commissioner Sundaresh Menon, in Re Shankar Alan s/o Anant Kulkarni (2007).

In Tang Liang Hong v. Lee Kuan Yew (1997), the Court of Appeal said that the Jeyaretnam case had "settled" the test for apparent bias as the reasonable suspicion of bias test. However, the Court also noted the existence of "the more stringent test of apparent bias" in Gough. It then added that "whichever of the tests the court applies, the court must ascertain the relevant facts and circumstances on which the alleged apparent bias is founded".

In Tang Kin Hwa, Judicial Commissioner Phang was of the opinion that there are no practical differences between the two tests, and warned against the dangers of "semantic hairsplitting". He took the view that while the concept of "reasonable suspicion" is indeed of a less stringent standard, the use of the "real likelihood" terminology in the real likelihood of bias test ensures that the court thinks in terms of possibility rather than a higher standard of probability of bias. Further, as the court or the public's perspective are both "integral parts of a holistic process" or "two sides of the same coin", there is no need to draw a distinction between the court's perspective on the one hand and the public's perspective on the other hand.

However, in the later case of Shankar Alan, Judicial Commissioner Menon took an opposing view, holding that "there are indeed some important differences between [the two tests]". First, he considered that there are material differences between the perspective of the inquiry, accepting that the real likelihood of bias test directs the inquiry at whether the court thinks there is a real likelihood or danger of bias, while the reasonable suspicion test considers it from the perspective of the public. He also considered that even with the rider that "likelihood" is to be equated with "possibility", there is still a significant difference between the court inquiring whether it thinks there is a sufficient (or real) possibility that the tribunal or court was biased on the one hand, and, on the other, whether a lay person might reasonably entertain such an apprehension, even if the court was satisfied that there was in fact no such danger. Secondly, there is also a difference in relation to the substance of the inquiry. The real likelihood test is concerned with the degree of possibility that there was bias even if it was unconscious. In contrast, the reasonable suspicion test is concerned with how it appears to the relevant observer and whether that observer could reasonably entertain a suspicion or apprehension of bias even if the court was satisfied that there was no possibility of bias in fact.

Thus, in general, the commonly perceived differences between the two tests relate to the stringency and the perspective of the inquiry the court takes when applying each test. The reasonable suspicion test is usually considered to be of a less stringent standard as compared to the real likelihood of bias test. The reasonable suspicion test is also thought to be applied from the perspective of the public (or in the eyes of a reasonable man), while the real likelihood of bias test is applied from the court's perspective.

Lionel Leo and Chen Siyuan have expressed the view that there is no significant difference between the two tests for apparent bias. In relation to the stringency of the tests, they appear to adopt Judicial Commissioner Phang's view that since the concept of "likelihood" entails the lower standard of "possibility" as opposed to "probability", the gap between the real likelihood and reasonable suspicion tests has been narrowed significantly. Regarding the perspective of the inquiry, as both tests are premised on an objective basis, Leo and Chen also appear to agree with the position that the court personifies the reasonable man, as stated in Gough and endorsed in Tang Kin Hwa. In addition, although the reasonable suspicion test is commonly thought to be applied from the perspective of the public, it may not actually reflect the public view accurately. With selective reporting and word-of-mouth discussions which sensationalize events, members of the public may still consider that there was a possibility of bias even though a reasonable member of the public who was apprised of all the relevant facts would not think so.

Applying the reasonable suspicion test from the perspective of an ordinary member of the public can ensure that public confidence in the judiciary remains unshaken. Nonetheless, Chief Justice Chan Sek Keong has made an ex curiae (out-of-court) statement to the effect that where the allegation of apparent bias is made by a professional man (such as a lawyer) against a court or a tribunal, as in Singh Kalpanath, it may be argued that the better viewpoint should be from that of the legal profession or the professional class, and not that of the layman.

==== Exception to the rule against bias: rule of necessity ====
The rule of necessity is perhaps the greatest single common law exception to the general rule that an adjudicator who appears to be biased or prejudiced must disqualify himself or herself from participating in a proceeding. The rule, which is firmly established in English, Commonwealth and American jurisdictions, has the following effect: the disqualification of an adjudicator will not be permitted to destroy the only tribunal with power to act. The rule applies regardless of whether the disqualification arguably arises from the combination of prosecutorial and judicial functions, pecuniary interest, personal hostility or bias.

There are limitations to the operation of the rule of necessity, such as in the case where the disqualification of a member will still leave a quorum of an administrative agency capable of acting. It is also not applicable where the statute provides an alternative forum to the biased tribunal, or where the statute contemplates that a majority of the agency can reach a decision. There may perhaps also be a limitation that even the rule of necessity will not justify an adjudicator sitting where actual bias can be shown.

=== Fair hearing ===
The rule of fair hearing is the other of the two pillars of natural justice. It is encapsulated in the Latin maxim audi alteram partem, which implies that everyone has a right to be heard and that none ought therefore to be condemned unheard. This principle must be observed by courts, tribunals, arbitrators and all persons or bodies having the duty to act judicially, save where their application is excluded expressly or by necessary implication. The need for fair hearing is important as it forms a part of good procedure by reflecting a universal sense of fair play.

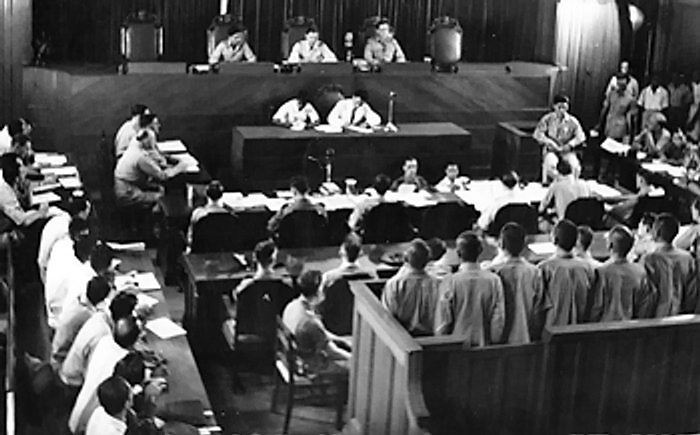
Japanese soldiers on trial for war crimes in the Old Supreme Court Building on 21 January 1946. The rule of fair hearing, which is one of the two pillars of natural justice, requires that no one ought to be condemned unheard.

There are three rights assumed to be required for a fair hearing: that there is sufficient notice given to allow the case to be adequately prepared; that any person at a hearing will be entitled to know what evidence has been produced against him or her; and that there must be a proper opportunity to contest, contradict or correct any evidence, state one's case and raise relevant matters before the court.

In addition, a fair hearing may also include the rights to legal representation, to cross-examine witnesses, and to be given reasons for a decision; and a presumption in favour of an oral hearing. Applicants claiming a breach of the fair hearing requirement must prove to suffer substantial injustice since there is no such thing in law as a technical breach of natural justice. The requirements of fair hearing depend on the circumstances of the case such as the nature of the inquiry, the rules governing the tribunal, and the subject matter being dealt with.

In general, the rule applies only to conduct leading directly to a final decision, and not to an investigation meant for obtaining information. In Subbiah Pillai v. Wong Meng Meng (2001), the Court of Appeal held that there was no right for the solicitor in question to be present every time the Inquiry Committee of the Law Society of Singapore, which had been convened to look into a complaint against him, spoke to a witness. This was because the work of the Inquiry Committee was investigative rather than prosecutorial in nature. Even though the rule is of paramount importance, its application is not universal. The exact ambit of the rule is said to be unclear.

==== Right to be heard ====
The right to be heard refers to the right for a party's case to be heard before a decision is made. Even if a statute does not state the requirement for a hearing, it does not necessarily mean that a hearing will never be required. However, this right is neither automatic nor absolute. For instance, in Yong Vui Kong, the Court of Appeal noted that at common law a convicted offender seeking mercy had no right to be heard during the clemency process. In Singapore, this situation is reflected by the absence of any provision in Article 22P of the Constitution for an offender to be heard during the clemency process.

In Dow Jones Publishing Co. (Asia) Inc. v. Attorney-General (1989), the Court of Appeal found that it was not unfair that the Minister for Communications and Information had not given The Asian Wall Street Journal a chance to explain why it had published certain articles before declaring that the Journal had engaged in Singapore's domestic politics, and restricting its circulation under section 16 of the Newspaper and Printing Presses Act. The Court dismissed the appeal on the grounds that the Minister had not treated the appellant, Dow Jones, unfairly, nor had the appellant been prejudiced in any way by the lack of opportunity to make representations. This was because the appellant had already been warned by the Minister. Furthermore, it was aware from precedent that the Minister was likely to invoke section 16 upon its refusal to publish a letter from the Monetary Authority of Singapore responding to an article, and it had been given many opportunities to publish the letter.

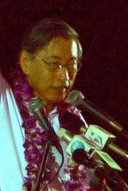
Opposition politician Chiam See Tong at a rally for the 2006 general election. In a 1993 case brought by Chiam against the Singapore Democratic Party, the High Court found that he had been given insufficient notice of alleged disciplinary charges against him.

==== Right to adequate notice ====
The rule of fair hearing requires that persons liable to be directly affected by the outcome of any decision must be given prior notification of the action proposed to be taken, of the time and place of any hearing that is to be conducted, and of the charge or case they will be called upon to meet. There is also a necessary implication that notice must not only be given, but that it must be sufficient and accurate. People should be told clearly what cases they are to meet and the cases against them should not be left to conjecture.

In Chiam See Tong v. Singapore Democratic Party (1993), the plaintiff Chiam See Tong, a politician, was asked in a letter from the Singapore Democratic Party initiating disciplinary proceedings against him, to "explain" some statements he had made about the party leadership. However, the actual question before the disciplinary committee was whether Chiam's statements were derogatory of the party's leadership and detrimental to the party's interest. Justice Warren L. H. Khoo found that the letter was insufficient to notify Chiam of the case to be met.

In Chng Wei Meng v. Public Prosecutor (2002), a case dealing with a person driving a motor vehicle when he had been disqualified from doing so, Chief Justice Yong Pung How concluded that on the facts, sufficient notice of the disqualification had been given to the appellant. Even though the written notice was slightly different from what the Road Traffic Act required, it was enough to have warned him of the possibility that his license could be disqualified. The police had also advised him that his license would be disqualified if he failed to attend court a second time. The appellant had also been informed of his right to be heard in court and the date, place and time of the hearing; a right which he knowingly and willingly forfeited by his non-attendance.

==== Right to sufficient time to prepare a response ====
Closely connected to the right to be informed of the case to be met is the right to have sufficient time to prepare a response. As a general rule, a person who is told to appear before hearing must be given sufficient time to effectively prepare his or her defence.

In Mohammed Aziz bin Ibrahim v. Pertubohan Kebangsaan Melayu Singapura (2004), the plaintiffs, who were members of the Pertubuhan Kebangsaan Melayu Singapura (Singapore Malay National Organisation), a political party in Singapore, had serious charges levelled against them impugning their honesty in financial management. A letter posted to the plaintiffs on 21 May 2003 required them to be ready to mount their defence before a disciplinary committee in two days. Justice Tan Lee Meng held that the plaintiffs were given inadequate notice of the meeting of the disciplinary committee. The party had thus breached the rules of natural justice by depriving the plaintiffs of a reasonable opportunity to prepare their defence against the numerous charges faced by them.

==== Right to access documentation ====
A party to a proceeding should have the right to access documentation which had been produced by the other party to the proceedings. It would be wrong if such documents were not shown to the other party at all. Parties to the proceedings needs time to study or make copies of the documents. However, as the High Court opined in Teng Cheng Sin v. Law Fay Yuen (2003), if a party does not request for copies of documents or for time to study the documents, a complaint of this nature will carry much less weight.

In relation to clemency pleas, in Yong Vui Kong the Court of Appeal was of the view that any right to disclosure of material relating to Article 22P(2) of the Constitution could only be based on a right of hearing of a clemency case. Since there is no right to petition for clemency and/or a right to be heard during the clemency process, it follows that no such right of disclosure exists under Article 22P.

==== Right to legal representation ====
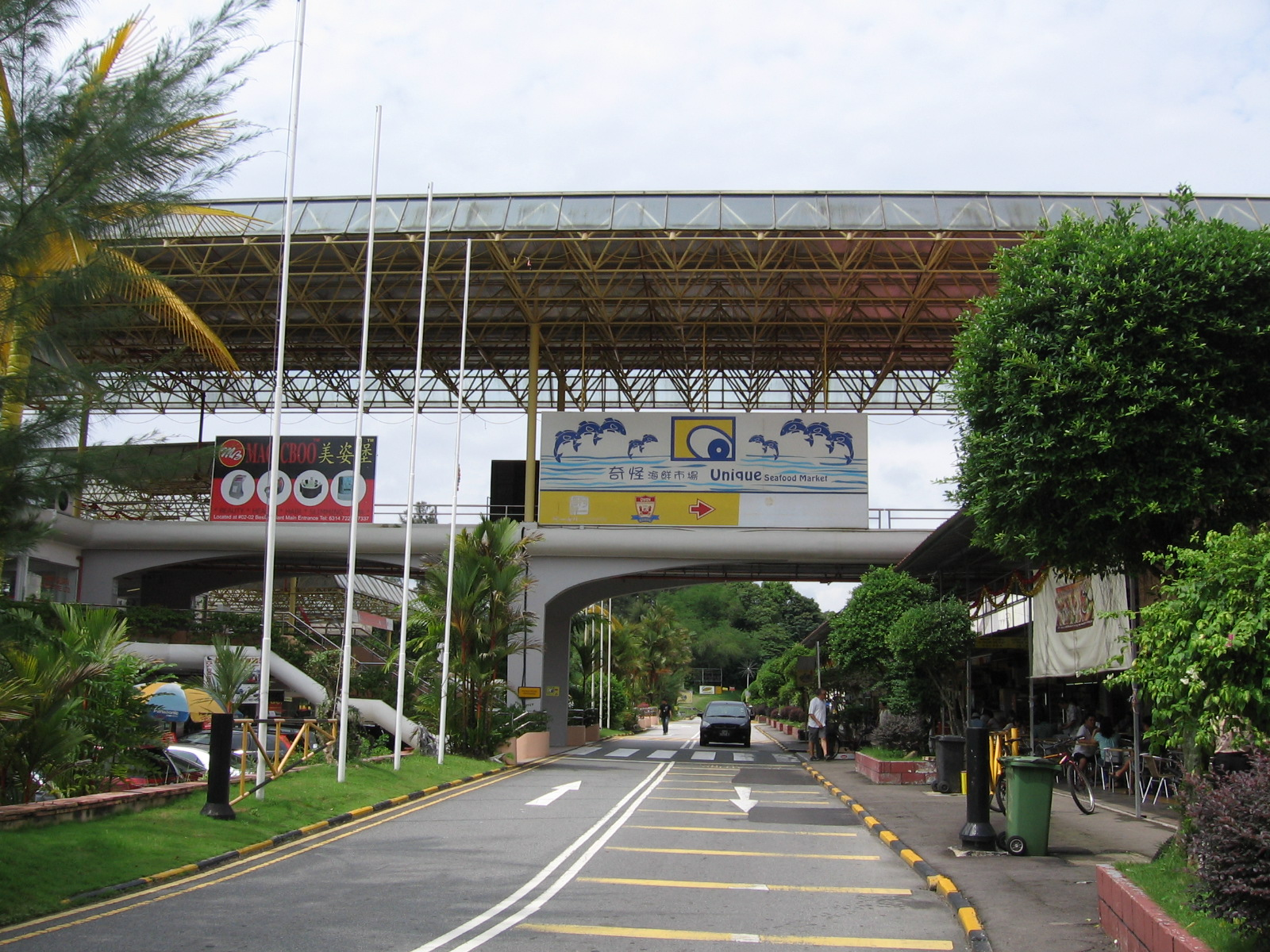
Turf City in Bukit Timah, the former location of the Bukit Turf Club. In a 1992 case against the Club, the High Court set out a number of factors that a tribunal should consider to decide if a person before it should be allowed legal representation.

There is no inherent common law right to be allowed legal representation before a domestic tribunal. On the other hand, the domestic tribunal has no inherent right either to deny legal representation to those who appear before it, and any request for legal representation must be properly given consideration before deciding whether or not to reject that request.

In Kok Seng Chong v. Bukit Turf Club (1992), Judicial Commissioner Michael Hwang endorsed the factors listed in R. v. Secretary of State for Home Department, ex parte Tarrant (1983) as those that ought to be taken into consideration when deciding if legal representation should be allowed:

- The seriousness of any allegations made or any potential penalty.
- Whether any points of law are likely to arise.
- The capacity of the particular individual to present his or her own case.
- Whether it will be necessary to cross-examine witnesses whose evidence has not been disclosed in advance.
- Any potential delay.
- The need for fairness as between all persons who may appear before the tribunal.

It has been suggested by Professor Thio Li-ann that where a domestic tribunal places an individual's reputation or his livelihood in jeopardy, the stronger the case for allowing legal representation is, particularly since this would vindicate the ideal of equality before the law. She also referred to the Malaysian case of Doresamy v. Public Service Commission (1971), in which the right to legal representation was linked to the notion of constitutional equality. Thio opined that this link to constitutional equality implies that a fundamental right is at stake and that this recognition "should lead to greater weightage being accorded to such procedural rights where balanced against competing demands of efficiency".

==== Duty to give reasons for decision ====
In Re Siah Mooi Guat (1988), the High Court noted that there is no common law duty for government ministers to give reasons for decisions. However, sometimes reasons have to be given depending on what is fair on the circumstances. The Master of the Rolls, Lord Denning, discussed this duty to give reasons in his dissenting judgement in Breen v. Amalgamated Engineering & Foundry Workers Union (1971):

If a man seeks a privilege to which he has no particular claim – such as an appointment to some post or other – then he can be turned away without a word. He need not be heard. No explanation need be given ... But if he is a man whose property is at stake, or who is being deprived of his livelihood, then reasons should be given why he is being turned down, and he should be given a chance to be heard. I go further. If he is a man who has some right or interest, or some legitimate expectation, of which it would not be fair to deprive him without a hearing, or reasons given, then these should be afforded him, according as the case may demand. The giving of reasons is one of the fundamentals of good administration.

Even though there is no common law duty to give reasons, there are certain written laws which provide for a duty to give reasons. For example, the Constitution imposes a duty on the President to provide reasons for approving budgets of certain statutory boards even if he opines that the budget may draw on past reserves.

Decisions rendered without reasons are not without implications: in the landmark decision in Padfield v. Minister of Agriculture, Fisheries and Food (1968), the House of Lords held that the absence of express reasons could lead the court to infer that the decision-maker had no grounds for its decision. This could especially be the case when the facts points to a decision converse to what the decision-maker has decided.

==== Fair conduct of the hearing ====
===== Rigour and standard of natural justice =====
The question of the rigour and standard of natural justice arises because in Kay Swee Pin v. Singapore Island Country Club (2008) the Court of Appeal suggested that "a more rigorous application of the rules of natural justice [was] called for" where the rules of a country club granted "very general and extensive disciplinary powers" over the club's members. Nevertheless, commentators have argued that there is no varying rigour in the application of rules of natural justice.

In Ho Paul v. Singapore Medical Council (2008), the High Court questioned if proceedings held without legal representation would be subject to a different standard of natural justice. An example was whether the tribunal should be expected to warn an unrepresented individual of the legal implications by failing to cross-examine witnesses. Judge of Appeal V. K. Rajah concluded that additional duties are not foisted on a tribunal merely because the individual is unrepresented. The main question in any alleged cases of breach of natural justice is whether the individuals concerned were given the opportunity to present their cases and if they suffered any prejudice as a result of any unfairness in the conduct of the proceedings. In the above case the appellant, a doctor who had been found guilty of professional misconduct, had been given the opportunity to present his case, cross-examine the witnesses, and also make a mitigation plea. Thus, the Court held that "there was simply no basis to suggest that fairness had been compromised".

===== Private communication with material witness =====
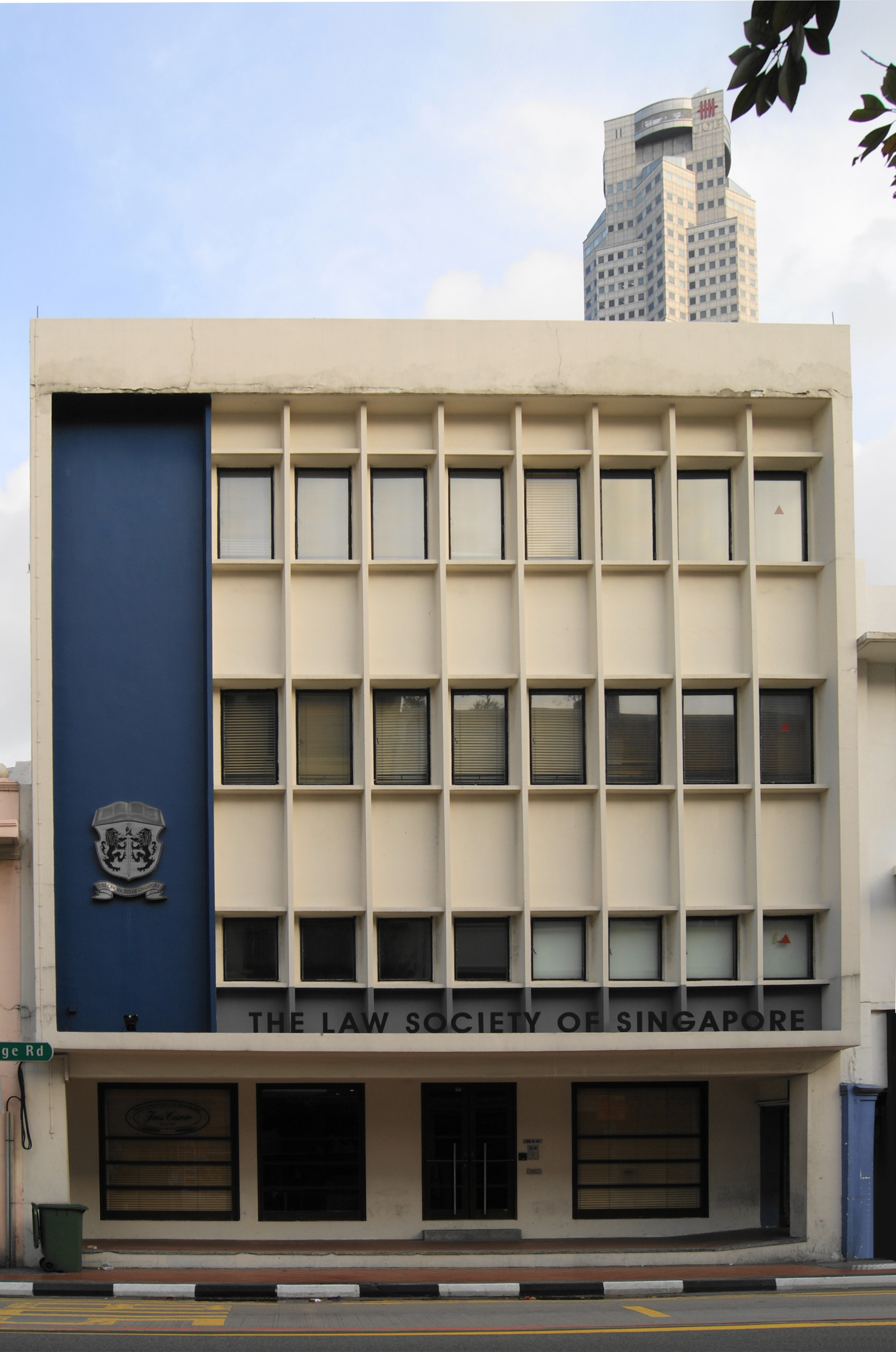
The Law Society of Singapore's headquarters along South Bridge Road. A disciplinary penalty imposed on a lawyer by the Society was set aside by the High Court in a 1998 case because the chairman of the Inquiry Committee had contacted a witness without informing the lawyer.

Members of a tribunal should not communicate independently or privately to any material witness. If they do so, the fact that communication has occurred must be disclosed to the parties concerned right away. The justification for this rule is that it would be unfair for a person to be judged on an issue based on information obtained by an adjudicator which is unknown to that person. In Re Low Fook Cheng Patricia (1998), a lawyer appealed to set aside the penalty for misconduct imposed on her by the Law Society of Singapore. The appeal was based on the ground that the chairman of the Inquiry Committee had contacted a witness to enquire if the witness could assist the committee in its inquiry, but this was not made known to the appellant. Judicial Commissioner Choo Han Teck considered such an act of private communication with a material witness as "pierc[ing] the veritable armour of impartiality which every tribunal exercising judicial or quasi-judicial functions must don". Thus, the penalty imposed by the Law Society was set aside.

===== Excessive intervention by tribunal =====
Excessive intervention by a tribunal is a breach of the fair hearing requirement. The principle behind this rule was elucidated succinctly by Justice Yong Pung How. He stated that since Singapore's justice system is adversarial and not inquisitorial, when hearing evidence a tribunal may seek clarification on points in the evidence which are not clear, but must at all times avoid descending into the arena and joining in the fray. The tribunal is there to judge as best it can and is not there to supplement the prosecution.

In Ng Chee Tiong Tony v. Public Prosecutor (2007), Justice Lee Seiu Kin set aside a trial judge's decision as he held that the judge had descended into the arena and joined in the fray. This was evident in the manner the trial judge had questioned the witnesses. There were excessive questions by the judge, especially some in the nature of a cross-examination. The conclusions formed by the judge also arose out of the line of questioning that she herself had adopted. The High Court also mentioned that it was the duty of the Prosecution to bring out the evidence to prove its case and not the judge's duty to do so, even if it was an attempt to make up for any shortfall in the conduct of the case by the prosecutor.

In contrast, in Mohammed Ali bin Johari v. Public Prosecutor (2008) the Court of Appeal found that the questions by the judge were asked to keep a tight rein on proceedings and procedure, and there was no denial of justice. Therefore, it was held that the trial judge had not descended into the arena. Writing for the Court, Judge of Appeal Andrew Phang reiterated that what is of fundamental importance is the judge does not conduct the proceedings in a manner which suggests that there has been the possibility of a denial of justice to a particular party.

=== Fundamental rules of natural justice in the Constitution ===
In Ong Ah Chuan v. Public Prosecutor (1980), the Privy Council, which was the Singapore's highest court, stated that references to law in provisions such as Article 9 and Article 12 of the Constitution "refer to a system of law which incorporates those fundamental rules of natural justice that had formed part of the common law of England that was in operation in Singapore at the commencement of the Constitution". Their Lordships stated that unless the law from which citizens seek recourse for the protection of constitutional fundamental liberties does not flout those fundamental rules, it would be a "misuse of language" to define law as something which provided "protection" for the individual's ability to enjoy his or her fundamental liberties.

Although Singapore cases have not provided an exhaustive list of the "fundamental rules of natural justice" mentioned in Ong Ah Chuan, they have provided some examples. For instance, one rule is that no person should be a judge in his own cause. In Tang Kin Hwa, the High Court stated that this was "clearly [a] fundamental principle of natural justice" which embodied the concept of impartiality and objectivity, thus going to "one of the very pillars of the enterprise of law itself".

In Yong Vui Kong, the Court of Appeal identified a conceptual difference between fundamental rules of natural justice in the Constitution, and ordinary rules of natural justice in administrative law – they are the same in nature and function, but they operate at different levels in the legal order. The fundamental rules of natural justice in the Constitution, which the Court also referred to as the "Ong Ah Chuan rules of natural justice", act to invalidate legislation on the ground of unconstitutionality. On the other hand, the rules of natural justice in administrative law (that is, the principles of impartiality and fair hearing) act to invalidate administrative decisions on the ground of administrative law principles.

== Procedural legitimate expectation ==
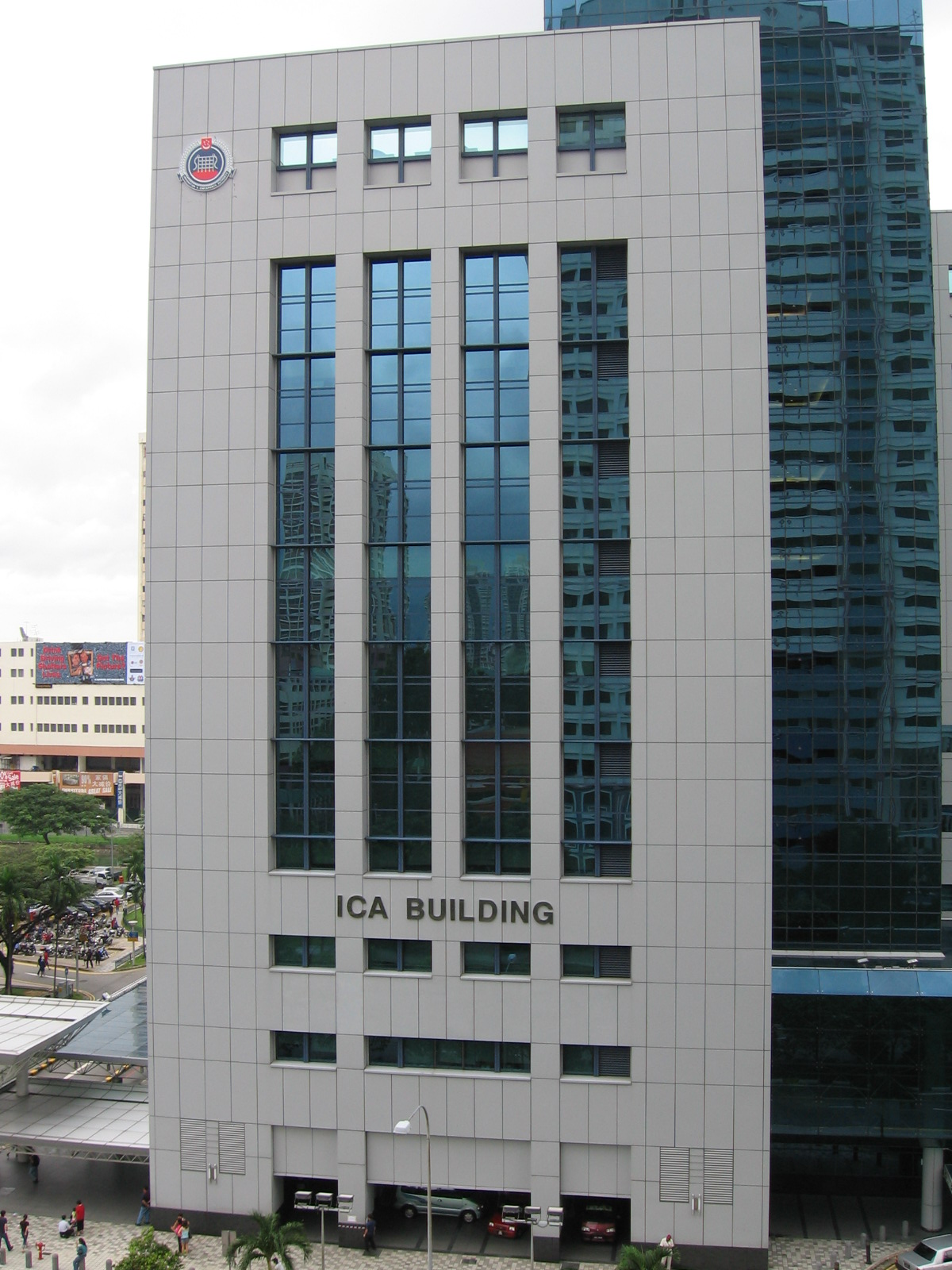
ICA Building, the headquarters of the Immigration and Checkpoints Authority. In Re Siah Mooi Guat (1988), which involved the cancellation of a Malaysian citizen's re-entry permit and employment pass by the Controller of Immigration, the High Court confirmed that procedural legitimate expectation is a ground of judicial review in Singapore.

The breach of a procedural legitimate expectation has been recognized as a form of procedural impropriety. This involves the idea that if a public authority has made a representation to an individual who will be affected by a decision that he or she can expect to be consulted in advance of the decision being taken but does not do so, this is unlawful. The representation giving rise to such a legitimate expectation may either be an express promise given on behalf of an authority, or the existence of a regular practice which the claimant can reasonably expect to continue. These principles were accepted as part of Singapore law in Re Siah Mooi Guat.

In Borissik v. Urban Redevelopment Authority (2009), the High Court said that a representation had to satisfy four conditions in order for a legitimate expectation to be created. The expectation must be: (1) clear, unambiguous and devoid of any relevant qualification; (2) induced by the conduct of the decision-maker; (3) made by a person with actual or ostensible authority; and (4) applicable to the applicant, who belongs to the class of persons to whom the representation is reasonably expected to apply. Subsequently, in Chiu Teng @ Kallang Pte. Ltd. v. Singapore Land Authority (2013), the Court stated that the following conditions need to be complied with for a legitimate expectation to arise:

(a) The applicant must prove that the statement or representation made by the public authority was unequivocal and unqualified;

(i) if the statement or representation is open to more than one natural interpretation, the interpretation applied by the public authority will be adopted; and
(ii) the presence of a disclaimer or non-reliance clause would cause the statement or representation to be qualified.

(b) The applicant must prove the statement or representation was made by someone with actual or ostensible authority to do so on behalf of the public authority.
(c) The applicant must prove that the statement or representation was made to him or to a class of persons to which he clearly belongs. (d) The applicant must prove that it was reasonable for him to rely on the statement or representation in the circumstances of his case:

(i) if the applicant knew that the statement or representation was made in error and chose to capitalise on the error, he will not be entitled to any relief;
(ii) similarly, if he suspected that the statement or representation was made in error and chose not to seek clarification when he could have done so, he will not be entitled to any relief;
(iii) if there is reason and opportunity to make enquiries and the applicant did not, he will not be entitled to any relief.

(e) The applicant must prove that he did rely on the statement or representation and that he suffered a detriment as a result.
(f) Even if all the above requirements are met, the court should nevertheless not grant relief if:

(i) giving effect to the statement or representation will result in a breach of the law or the State’s international obligations;
(ii) giving effect to the statement or representation will infringe the accrued rights of some member of the public;
(iii) the public authority can show an overriding national or public interest which justifies the frustration of the applicant's expectation.

The UK case of R. v. North and East Devon Health Authority, ex parte Coughlan (1999) established that legitimate expectations may have a substantive element as well. This involves a consideration of whether a change in policy was justified even after the individuals who would be affected by the change had already been consulted by the decision-making authority. In other words, a finding of substantive legitimate expectation may prevent a decision-maker from going back on a lawful representation that an individual will receive or continue to receive a substantive benefit of some kind. Substantive legitimate expectation was found to be a ground of judicial review in Singapore in Chiu Teng. The Court of Appeal has yet to rule definitively on whether substantive legitimate expectation should be recognized in Singapore as a ground of judicial review. In any case, it is arguably a form of illegality rather than procedural impropriety.
