= Doctrine of bias in Singapore law =

Principle of appellate law in Singapore

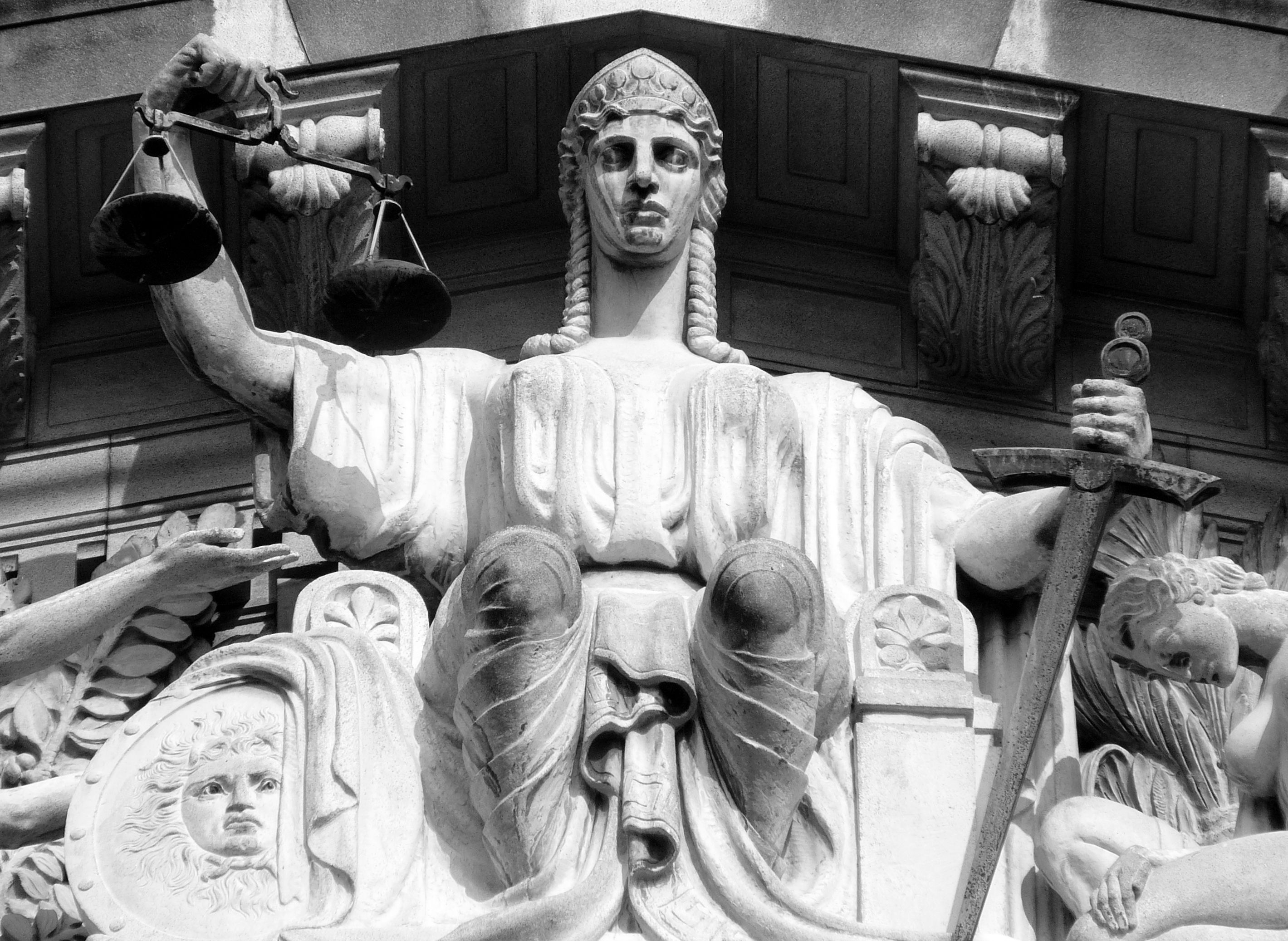
A depiction of Lady Justice on the tympanum of the Old Supreme Court Building

Bias is one of the grounds of judicial review in Singapore administrative law which a person can rely upon to challenge the judgment of a court or tribunal, or a public authority's action or decision. There are three forms of bias, namely, actual, imputed and apparent bias.

If actual bias on the part of an adjudicator can be proved, the High Court can quash the decision. Cases of actual bias are rare due to the difficulty of proving the existence of a prejudiced judicial mindset. Imputed bias arises when a decision-maker has a pecuniary (monetary) or proprietary (property related) interest in the decision he or she is charged to adjudicate. The courts have also extended the category of imputed bias to situations where adjudicators have personal, non-pecuniary interests in decisions. The existence of a situation leading to an imputation of bias warrants the decision-maker being automatically disqualified.

Even if actual or imputed bias cannot be proved, an appearance of bias is sufficient for a judgment or decision to be set aside. The legal test for establishing apparent bias in Singapore has been the subject of some controversy. In the cases of Jeyaretnam Joshua Benjamin v. Lee Kuan Yew (1992) and Tang Liang Hong v. Lee Kuan Yew (1997), the Court of Appeal stated that the test should be "reasonable suspicion", that is, the court should ask itself whether "a reasonable and fair-minded person sitting in court and knowing all the relevant facts [would] have a reasonable suspicion that a fair trial for the applicant was not possible". However, after a number of cases which established that a "real likelihood" test should be applied in the UK, the High Court in Tang Kin Hwa v. Traditional Chinese Medicine Practitioners Board (2005) expressed the obiter view that there was in fact no material difference between the two tests. In Re Shankar Alan s/o Anant Kulkarni (2006), a different High Court judge disagreed with this view, holding that the reasonable suspicion test is less stringent as it requires a lower standard of proof than satisfaction on a balance of probabilities. He expressed preference for the reasonable suspicion test over the real likelihood test. As of January 2013, the Court of Appeal had not yet ruled on the matter.

== Doctrine of bias ==
Bias is one of the grounds of judicial review in Singapore. It is an aspect of the principle nemo iudex in causa sua – no one should be a judge in his or her own cause – which is regarded as one of the twin pillars of natural justice. As Lord Hodson put it in Ridge v. Baldwin (1963), one of the features of natural justice is "the right to be heard by an unbiased tribunal".

Prior to Ridge v. Baldwin, UK law drew a distinction between situations where decision-makers were under a legal duty to act judicially or quasi-judicially, and situations where they were regarded as acting in a purely administrative manner. Decision-makers were only required to comply with the requirements of natural justice in the former situation. The position in Singapore was the same. In an old Straits Settlements case originating from Singapore, Alkaff and Co. v. The Governor in Council (1937), the Straits Settlements Court of Appeal noted that in order for the law relating to bias to apply to the Commissioner of Lands, it was "first necessary for the Court to be satisfied that he was acting in a judicial or quasi-judicial capacity". However, in Ridge v. Baldwin the House of Lords found this distinction to be false. Thus, the legal position today is that all public authorities, whether judges or administrative officers, must comply with the rules of natural justice.

What public authorities must do to avoid bias was expressed in the High Court of Singapore decision Re Singh Kalpanath (1992) by Justice Chan Sek Keong as follows: "A judge is expected to maintain the highest standard of conduct in the exercise of his functions. He must bring an open and impartial mind to the determination of the dispute before him and must not act in any way which compromises the integrity of the judicial process." In Kalpanath, it was stated that there are three kinds of bias: actual, imputed and apparent bias.

== Actual bias ==
If actual bias on the part of a judge or tribunal can be proved by a party to a legal proceeding, or on the part of a public authority by a person aggrieved by its decision, the High Court can quash the judgment or decision. A decision-maker will be deemed actually biased if it is shown that he or she was influenced by partiality in reaching the decision or was actually prejudiced in reaching the decision. In Chee Siok Chin v. Attorney-General (2006), allegations of actual bias were made based on the actions of the judge, Justice Belinda Ang. Her failure to prevent the opposing counsel from interrupting the appellant was supposedly reflective of a biased state of mind. Justice Ang adopted the view in Locabail (UK) Ltd. v. Bayfield Properties Ltd. (1999) that cases of actual bias are rare due to the difficulty of proving the existence of a prejudiced judicial mindset. Rather, the inclination of the law "is to protect litigants who can discharge the lesser burden of showing a real danger of bias without requiring them to show that such bias actually exists".

The allegations of actual bias in Chee Sok Chin were deemed to be "entirely frivolous and ludicrous", in that "a fair-minded and reasonable observer would hardly on those flimsy grounds" conclude that Justice Ang "would not be able to make an objective and impartial decision of the matters" before her as another impartial judge would. Citing Tang Liang Hong v. Lee Kuan Yew (1997), an apparent bias case, the judge said that claims of actual bias need to be based on facts which are "substantially true and accurate".

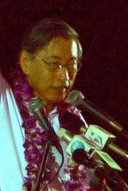
Chiam See Tong in May 2006. In a 1993 case arising from Chiam's challenge against his expulsion from the Singapore Democratic Party, the Court of Appeal held that the Party's disciplinary subcommittee had acted in a biased manner.

In Hennedige Oliver v. Singapore Dental Council (2007), the High Court held that members of the Disciplinary Committee ("DC") of the council had not acted in a biased manner towards Hennedige even though they had interjected a number of times during Hennedige's testimony, and had treated the person who had lodged a complaint against Hennedige gently but had cross-examined Hennedige robustly and strongly challenged his evidence. This was because the members of the DC were entitled to seek clarifications from Hennedige. Furthermore, his evidence covered much wider ground than the complainant's, and part of Hennedige's oral evidence at the inquiry did not feature in his written explanation. The nature of the Hennedige's answers at the inquiry warranted the additional questions, and he must have expected his peers in the DC to question him thoroughly on his many assertions.

There have been a number of cases in which allegations of actual bias have been made out. In Wong Kok Chin v. Singapore Society of Accountants (1989), the High Court held that people hearing disciplinary proceedings have to approach the issue with an open mind without prejudgment. In this instance, the members of the Society's Disciplinary Committee had gone beyond their authority to carry out a due inquiry and had caused the inquiry to become an inquisition aimed at securing evidence to justify a finding of guilt. Likewise in Singapore Amateur Athletic Association v. Haron bin Mundir (1993), the Court of Appeal stated that the slanted questions and preconceived views of the Association's disciplinary subcommittee had breached natural justice. The hearing had been "more like an inquisition to vindicate the corporate views of the appellants" than a dispassionate attempt at finding the truth. In Chiam See Tong v. Singapore Democratic Party (1993), Chiam challenged his expulsion from the political party following a hearing before the disciplinary committee of the Party's Central Executive Committee ("CEC"). The High Court found that the members of the disciplinary committee had been biased, as was reflected in the confrontational and hostile tone taken by certain CEC members. In addition, some of them had acted as judges in their own cause as they had been the object of remarks made by Chiam, which had prompted the disciplinary proceedings.

== Imputed bias ==
=== Arising from a pecuniary or proprietary interest ===
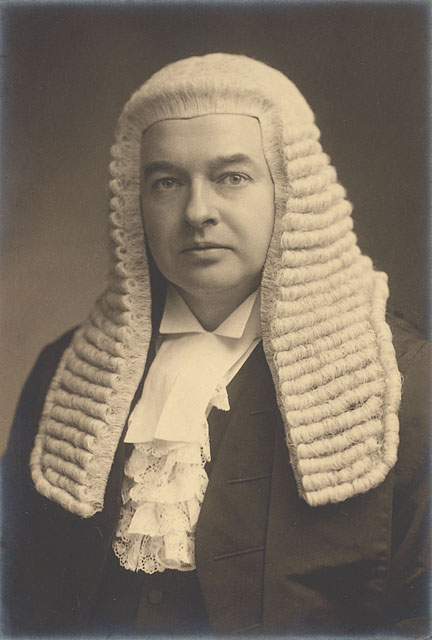
Lord Chief Justice Hewart, who, in R. v. Sussex Justices, ex parte McCarthy (1923), stated that "justice should not only be done, but should manifestly and undoubtedly be seen to be done".

Bias may be imputed to a decision-maker when he or she has a pecuniary (monetary) or proprietary (property related) interest in the decision he or she is charged to adjudicate. This form of bias warrants the decision-maker being automatically disqualified from exercising its powers. The rule is vigorously enforced to protect the maxim enunciated by Lord Chief Justice Hewart in R. v. Sussex Justices, ex parte McCarthy (1923) that "justice should not only be done, but should manifestly and undoubtedly be seen to be done".

A pecuniary or proprietary interest can arise in two ways. First, the decision-maker may have an interest of this nature in one of the parties involved in a matter. Secondly, the decision-maker may have a pecuniary or proprietary interest in the outcome of the decision placed before him or her. The two situations are not mutually exclusive – in a 1999 decision, the Court of Appeal of Victoria held that it is not a judge's mere shareholding in a party "but rather it is the potential interest, created by that shareholding, in the subject matter or outcome of the litigation which is the disqualifying factor". A seminal case in this respect is Dimes v. Grand Junction Canal Proprietors (1852). In that case the Lord Chancellor, Lord Cottenham, was found to have an interest as a shareholder in a company which was a party to a suit presented to him. As this fact was discovered after his Lordship had heard the suit, he was disqualified on the ground of his interest and the decree he issued was held to be voidable. The House of Lords said that it is "a settled principle of constitutional law that a man cannot be judge in his own cause". In Alkaff, the Straits Settlements Court of Appeal recognised that a financial interest may affect a person with bias.

In considering whether a pecuniary or proprietary interest exists, it is irrelevant whether the decision-maker was actually biased or not when exercising his or her powers. Though it may be practically possible to exercise impartiality in such a situation, it is the appearance of justice that lies at the root of this principle of natural justice. In Dimes, certiorari was granted to quash Lord Cottenham's decree due to his pecuniary interest in the outcome of the case even though, as Lord Campbell stated, "[n]o one can suppose that Lord Cottenham could be, in the remotest degree, influenced by the interest that he had in this concern". Similarly, in the Alkaff case Acting Chief Justice Terrell noted that the rule against bias applied even though, quoting the trial judge, "[the Commissioner of Lands] was in fact completely unbiased. He conducted his inquiry in each case methodically and exhaustively and with the most fairness and impartiality".

In answering the central question of what constitutes a pecuniary or proprietary interest, the trend over time has been towards a raising of the degree of the interest that will disqualify adjudicators. In the 19th century it was held that "any direct pecuniary interest, however small" would result in a disqualification for bias. By 1999, the courts had come to apply a de minimis exception to the degree of pecuniary interest required. Nonetheless, "any doubt should be resolved in favour of disqualification".

=== Arising from a non-pecuniary personal interest ===
The courts have extended the category of imputed bias to situations where adjudicators have interests in decisions that are personal but neither pecuniary nor proprietary. A well-known example is the UK case R. v. Bow Street Metropolitan Stipendiary Magistrate, ex parte Pinochet Ugarte (No. 2) (1999). Amnesty International was a party to the case, and the House of Lords held that Lord Hoffmann, being a chairman of a subsidiary of Amnesty, ought to have been automatically disqualified from hearing the case. This was despite his Lordship having neither a pecuniary nor proprietary interest in the outcome of the case. It observed:

If the absolute impartiality of the judiciary is to be maintained, there must be a rule which automatically disqualifies a judge who is involved, whether personally or as a director of a company, in promoting the same causes in the same organisation as is a party to the suit. There is no room for fine distinctions if Lord Hewart C.J.'s famous dictum is to be observed: it is "of fundamental importance that justice should not only be done, but should manifestly and undoubtedly be seen to be done[".]

The case of Locabail elaborated on the factors that may lead to such bias being imputed. The Court of Appeal of England and Wales noted that while it is "dangerous and futile to attempt to define or list the factors which may or may not give rise to a real danger of bias", such a danger may be found if, among other things, a judge is found to be:

... closely acquainted with any member of the public involved in the case, particularly if the credibility of that individual could be significant in the decision of the case; or if, in a case where the credibility of any individual were an issue to be decided by the judge, he had in a previous case rejected the evidence of that person in such outspoken terms as to throw doubt on his ability to approach such person's evidence with an open mind on any later occasion; or if on any question at issue in the proceedings before him the judge had expressed views, particularly in the course of the hearing, in such extreme and unbalanced terms as to throw doubt on his ability to try the issue with an objective judicial mind ...; or if, for any other reason, there were real ground for doubting the ability of the judge to ignore extraneous considerations, prejudices and predilections and bring an objective judgment to bear on the issues before him.

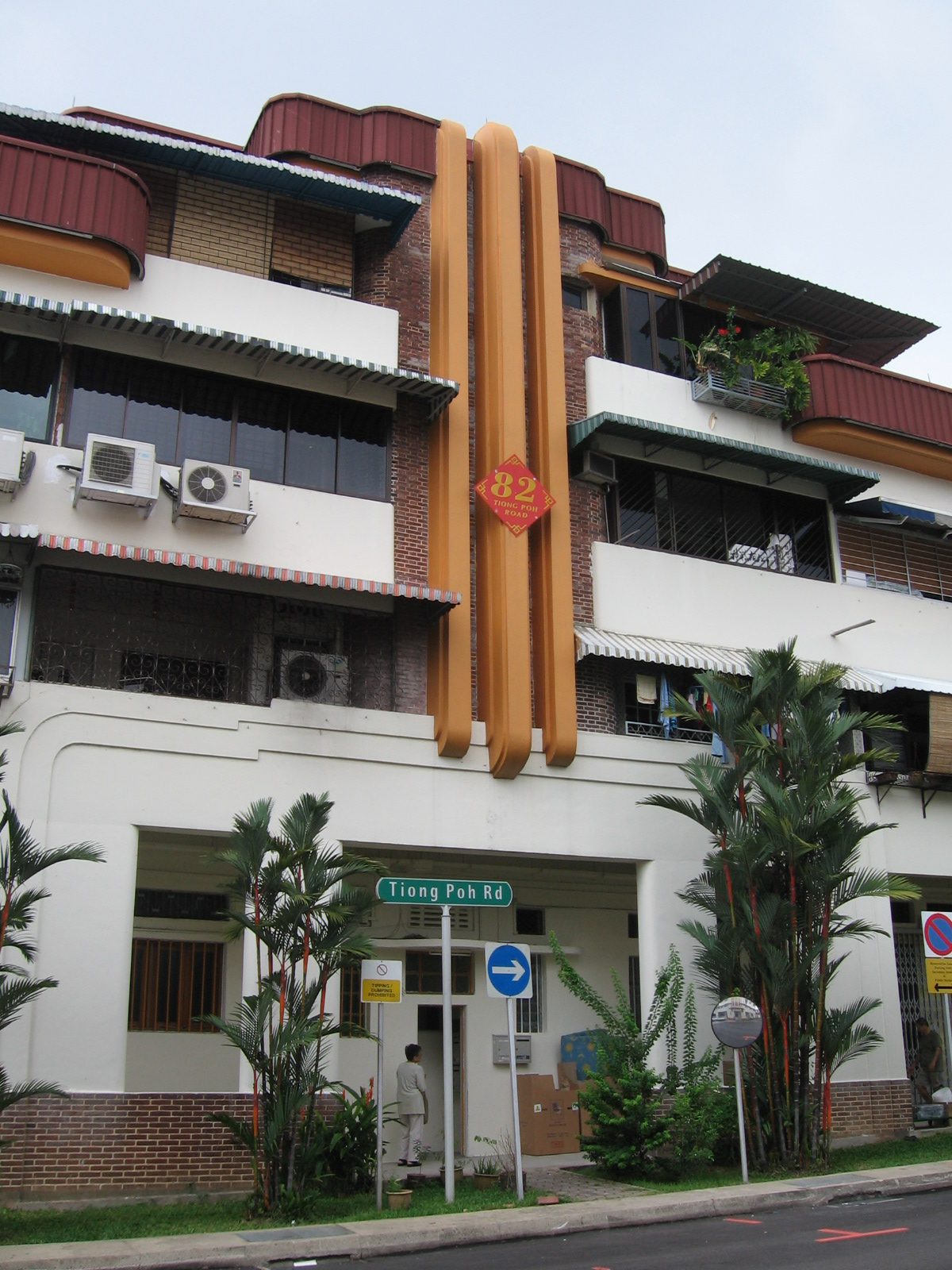
A Singapore Improvement Trust building in Tiong Bahru Estate. In a 1937 case the Straits Settlements Court of Appeal held there was a possibility of bias when the Commissioner of Lands was appointed by the Governor-in-Council to look into the merits of certain proposals made by the Trust even though the Commissioner was a Trust member.

In Alkaff, the Singapore Improvement Trust (SIT) had made three proposals for back lanes to be laid out. The Governor-in-Council appointed the Commissioner of Lands, who was an ex officio member of the SIT, to inquire into the merits of the proposals, and eventually made orders approving them. As regards the Commissioner's dual role, the members of the court agreed that, in the words of Federated Malay States Chief Justice Thomas, "there did exist a fear of prejudice and a possibility of being considered to be biassed [sic] which would infringe the high criterion that not only must justice be done but also must appear to be done".

Imputed bias was also referred to in Yong Vui Kong v. Attorney-General (2011), which involved the issue of whether the President exercises the power of clemency in his personal discretion or whether he is required to act upon the Cabinet's advice. The appellant argued that Chief Justice Chan Sek Keong, who was a member of the Court of Appeal hearing the matter, ought to be automatically disqualified. According to the appellant, this was because the Chief Justice had previously been the Attorney-General, and as such, must have advised the President on the scope of his discretion. The implication of the appellant's submission was that the Chief Justice would have to decide the case against the appellant to cover up any negligence in his advice to the President. The Court endorsed the principle of judicial disqualification in the case of a personal interest, stating that "where a judge is personally interested in the outcome of the case before him, he will not be able to give an impartial and objective judgment on the case. If he were to be allowed to adjudicate on the case notwithstanding this risk, that would, without more, undermine public confidence in the integrity of the administration of justice." It went on to reject the applicant's argument based on the principle laid down by the Court of Appeal of England and Wales in Locabail that a judge "would be as wrong to yield to a tenuous or frivolous objection as he would to ignore an objection of substance". In the Court's view, the disqualification application was frivolous and appeared to be motivated to diminish the judicial process such that a fresh hearing had to be convened. In addition, the central premise of the application – that the President could have acted in his own discretion in exercising the clemency power – was implausible.

Where Singapore judicial officers are concerned, there is a statutory rule that such an officer cannot "investigate, try or commit for trial any proceedings to which he is a party or in which he is personally interested".

== Apparent bias ==
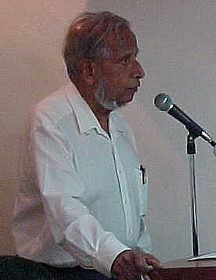
Opposition politician Joshua Benjamin Jeyaretnam in November 2005. In a 1992 appeal arising from a suit brought against him by the then Prime Minister Lee Kuan Yew for slander at a political rally during the 1988 general election, the Court of Appeal held that a "reasonable suspicion" test applied when determining if there was apparent bias by a judge.

Regardless of whether judges or administrators are actually biased, the law requires them to recuse themselves from cases where there may be a perception that they are biased. This is based on the premise that "justice should not only be done, but should manifestly and undoubtedly be seen to be done". As the High Court in Chee Siok Chin noted, the UK courts do not require actual bias to be shown in order to remove a judge from the hearing of that case. Rather, its stance "is to protect litigants who can discharge the lesser burden of showing a real danger of bias without requiring them to show that such bias actually exists."

In Jeyaretnam Joshua Benjamin v. Lee Kuan Yew (1992), the Court of Appeal stated that when determining whether apparent bias exists, a "reasonable suspicion" test should be applied, that is, "would a reasonable and fair-minded person sitting in court and knowing all the relevant facts have a reasonable suspicion that a fair trial for the applicant was not possible"? The reasonable suspicion test originated in Australia, where it is known as the "reasonable apprehension" test. The current position in Australia may be best summed up thus: "[A] judge is disqualified if a fair-minded lay observer might reasonably apprehend that the judge might not bring an impartial mind to the resolution of the question the judge is required to decide". This is essentially the same position in Singapore, as Tang Liang Hong v. Lee Kuan Yew (1997), which applied the Australian cases Bainton v. Rajski (1992) and Re JRL, ex parte CJL (1986), indicates.

In the Kalpanath case, the Disciplinary Committee of the Law Society of Singapore had determined that there was a sufficiently serious case for disciplinary action to be taken against the applicant, a lawyer. The respondent, who was the chairman of the Disciplinary Committee, had engaged in private conversations with a material witness while the applicant's hearing before the committee was going on. The applicant claimed that this showed the respondent could reasonably be thought to have displayed bias, and as a result the whole Committee was tainted by the bias. The proceedings were eventually quashed upon a finding of apparent bias.

=== UK developments ===
In the UK case R. v. Gough (1993), the House of Lords articulated a "real danger of bias" test. According to Lord Goff of Chieveley, when formulating the appropriate test for apparent bias, it was "unnecessary ... to require that the court should look at the matter through the eyes of the reasonable man, because the court in cases such as these personifies the reasonable man". He took the view that the test should be stated in terms of "real danger rather than real likelihood to ensure that the court is thinking in terms of possibility rather than probability of bias".

In Locabail, the Court of Appeal observed that Gough had not received universal approval in some jurisdictions. The Court was presented with another opportunity to review the matter in Re Medicaments and Related Classes of Goods (No. 2) (2000). It concluded that, in view of the jurisprudence of the European Court of Human Rights on the right to a fair trial protected by Article 6 of the European Convention on Human Rights, a "modest adjustment" to the Gough test was required. A court should first determine what are all the circumstances relevant to the allegation that the judge was biased, then ask whether a "fair-minded and informed observer" would regard those circumstances to lead to "a real possibility, or a real danger, the two being the same", that the judge was biased.

Finally, in Porter v. Magill (2001), the House of Lords reconsidered its earlier decision in Gough in the light of Locabail and Re Medicaments. It approved the two-stage test established in Locabail as modified by Re Medicaments, holding that there is apparent bias when "the fair-minded and informed observer, having considered the facts, would conclude that there was a real possibility that the tribunal was biased". It omitted from the test the reference to "real danger" as it was not mentioned in European Court of Human Rights cases and "no longer serve[d] a useful purpose here".

Subsequent cases have focused attention on the fact that the view of the informed observer has sometimes become dangerously close to becoming the court's view. In dealing with this, the court must adopt the public's view of the facts, not its own view. This distinction is not one of semantics, but bears great significance as it signifies the acceptance of public perception in the judicial process.

=== Singapore developments ===
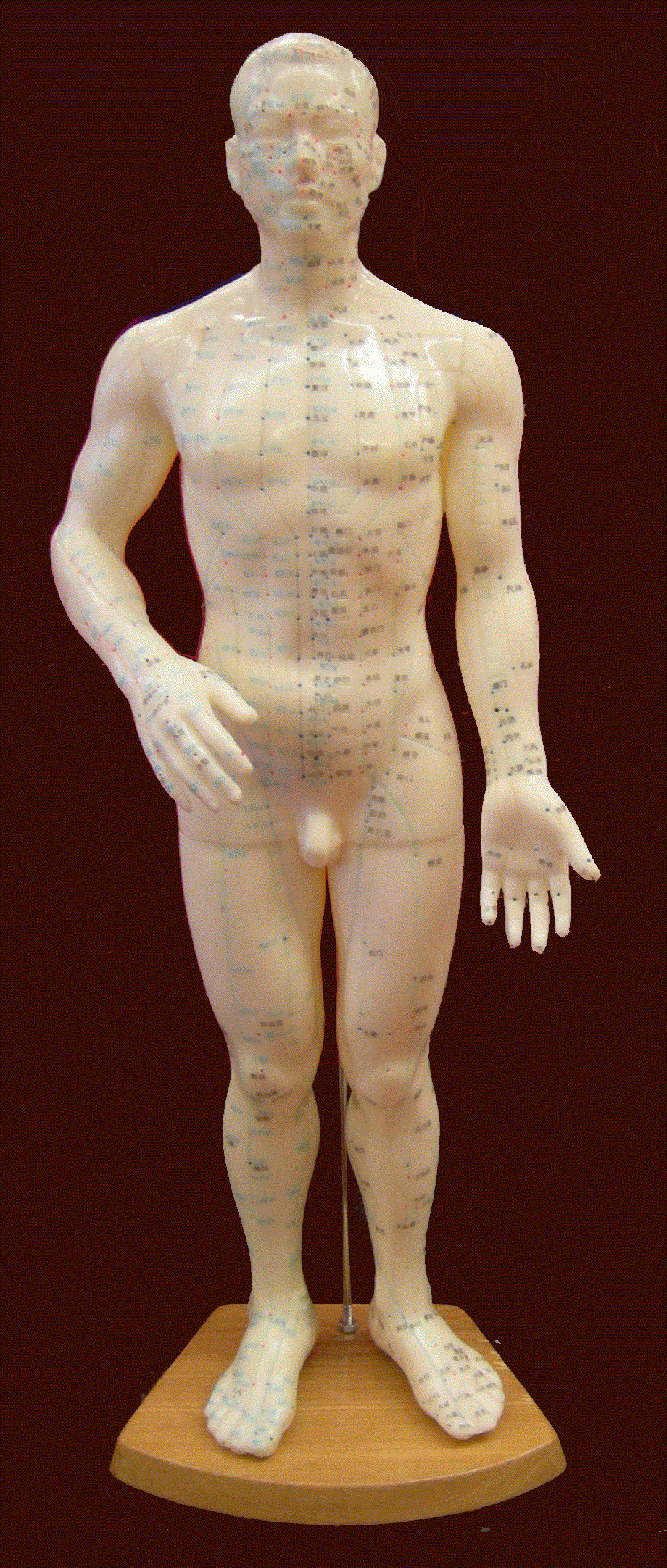
Allegations by an acupuncturist that there had been apparent bias by three members of the Traditional Chinese Medicine Practitioners Board which had suspended him from practice led to a 2005 case in which the High Court expressed the view that there is no real difference between the "reasonable suspicion" and "real likelihood" tests.

==== Tang Kin Hwa v. Traditional Chinese Medicine Practitioners Board (2005) ====
Following the legal developments in the UK, the test for apparent bias in Singapore was extensively reconsidered by the High Court in the 2005 case Tang Kin Hwa v. Traditional Chinese Medicine Practitioners Board. On the facts of the case, it was unnecessary for Judicial Commissioner Andrew Phang to have decided definitively whether the correct test was the reasonable suspicion or the real likelihood test. Nonetheless, he expressed the obiter view that the "reasonable suspicion of bias" test established in Jeyaretnam Joshua Benjamin and Tang Liang Hong was not significantly different from the English "real likelihood of bias" test (also known as "real possibility of bias" test). According to him, "[t]he common substance of both tests appears, in a nutshell, to be this: The key question is whether or not there was a perception on the part of a reasonable person that there would be a real likelihood of bias". The concept of "likelihood" entails "possibility" and not "probability". Phang opined that this is simply another way of stating that there is a "reasonable suspicion" on the part of the person concerned, meaning that although the concept of "reasonable suspicion" is supposed to be of a less stringent standard, this standard is reflected in the concept of "possibility" and thus there is essentially no substantial difference in the two tests. In addition, the word real in the term real likelihood of bias cannot mean "actual", as the test after all pertains to apparent bias and not actual bias.

Judicial Commissioner Phang also thought that "one ought not to draw a sharp distinction between the court's perspective ... and that of the public" as both are "integral parts of a holistic process". The practical reality in every case is that the court has to take into consideration the perspective of the public, and hence personifies the reasonable man. He cautioned that in deciding a case, a court has to focus on the substance and not be unduly distracted by the form of the terminology utilised. In applying either test, justice can be done and seen to be done if the court, personifying the reasonable man, takes a broad commonsense approach without inappropriately relying on special knowledge, the minutiae of court procedure or other matters outside the ken of the ordinary, reasonably well informed member of the public.

==== Re Shankar Alan s/o Anant Kulkarni (2006) ====
The following year, a different judge of the High Court departed from the view taken in Tang Kin Hwa. In Re Shankar Alan s/o Anant Kulkarni (2006), Judicial Commissioner Sundaresh Menon definitively answering the question left open by Phang as to whether the two tests for apparent bias were the same. He thought that there was a real difference between the reasonable suspicion and real likelihood tests. In his opinion, "suspicion" suggests a belief that something that may not be provable could still be possible. "Reasonable" suggests that the belief cannot be fanciful. Here the issue is whether it is reasonable for the one to harbour the suspicions in the circumstances even though the suspicious behaviour could be innocent. On the other hand, "likelihood" points towards something being likely, and "real" suggests that this must be substantial rather than imagined. Here, then, the inquiry is directed more towards the actor than the observer. The issue is the degree to which a particular event is not likely or possible.

Menon disagreed with both Lord Goff in Gough and Judicial Commissioner Phang in Tang Kin Hwa in that he thought the shift of the inquiry from how the matter might appear to a reasonable man to whether the judge thinks there is a sufficient possibility of bias was "a very significant point of departure" The real likelihood test is met as long as the court is satisfied that there is a sufficient degree of possibility of bias. Although this a lower standard than satisfaction on a balance of probabilities, this is actually directed at mitigating the sheer difficulty of proving actual bias, especially given its insidious and often subconscious nature. The reasonable suspicion test, however, is met if the court is satisfied that a reasonable member of the public could harbour a reasonable suspicion of bias even though the court itself thought there was no real danger of this on the facts. The difference is that the driver behind this test is the strong public interest in ensuring public confidence in the administration of justice.

Ultimately, Judicial Commissioner Menon reiterated that the test applicable in Singapore is the reasonable suspicion test, as the Court of Appeal had stated in Jeyaretnam Joshua Benjamin and Tang Liang Hong. He also expressed preference for this test for the following reasons, among others:

- If the court adopts the real likelihood test, it will in reality be requiring the complainant to show that the judge was actually biased, though with a lower standard of proof based on a sufficient degree of possibility.
- There is a risk that if the real likelihood test is applied, the court appears to be determining that it is possible or likely that the judge was biased. Therefore, the test may lead to dissatisfaction in the administration of justice on the part of members of the public, which is exactly what the doctrine of apparent bias was intended to avoid.
- Conscious of the negative consequences of the real likelihood test on the judge in question and the administration of justice referred to in the previous paragraph, the court may lose sight of the rationale behind the apparent bias doctrine – that justice is not merely done but that the public must see without doubt that it is done.

Furthermore, Menon argued that the real likelihood test requires there be a sufficient degree of bias, but this is "utterly imprecise" and "inherently, indeed impossibly, subjective". In contrast, the reasonable suspicion test avoids this problem as it directs the court's mind not towards the degree of possibility of bias but towards the suspicions the court thinks a fair-minded member of the public could reasonably entertain on the facts.

Shankar Alan is not the final say on the matter. As Judicial Commissioner Phang put it in Tang Kin Hwa, "a definitive view ought to be expressed by the Singapore Court of Appeal itself. Principles of natural justice are so fundamental that any interpretation or elaboration of them must have no less than the imprimatur of the highest court of the land." As of January 2013, the opportunity for the Court of Appeal to rule on the matter had not arisen.

==== Academic views ====
The view has been taken by scholars that there is no practical difference between the reasonable suspicion and real likelihood tests. In a 2008 paper, Lionel Leo and Chen Siyuan concede that there is a slight difference in the meaning of the terms real likelihood and reasonable suspicion, but are of the view that this difference is hardly material. The gap between the two tests is considerably narrow and, in practice, the two tests are unlikely to yield different results in most cases. It was stated in Cook International Inc. v. B.V. Handelmaatschappij Jean Delvaux (1985) that the contrast between the tests was between reasonable suspicion of bias on the one hand, and the appearance of a real likelihood of bias on the other. Hence what must be established is the appearance of a real possibility of bias and this is not very different from establishing that a fair-minded member of the public could have a reasonable suspicion that a fair trial for the litigant was not possible.

The reasonable suspicion test has the intention of protecting public confidence, but Leo and Chen wonder how accurately this test actually reflects the public's view. The test as formulated in Jeyaretnam Joshua Benjamin requires that the reasonable man be sitting in court and in the know of all the relevant facts. However, this is usually not the case. Most of the public only receives information in bits and pieces, and thus even if a case passes the reasonable suspicion test, the public may not be satisfied that there was no possibility of bias. Thus the concept that the reasonable suspicion test reflects the public's perspective is overstated. The practical reality is that when the reasonable man is imbued with all the relevant facts, he will essentially be in the same position as the court. Therefore, the suggested approach is that the court, in personifying the reasonable man, should take into account all relevant circumstances and determine if there is the suspicion or possibility of the appearance of bias whilst being mindful to exclude considerations stemming from the individual judge's personal preferences, special knowledge and legal sophistication.

Dame Sian Elias, the Chief Justice of New Zealand, observed at a lecture to the Singapore Academy of Law in 2004 that while the appearance of impartiality matters, it is necessary to acknowledge that good judges cannot be "ideological virgins", and that it is disadvantageous to require them to be cloistered from society. She noted that the public has to rely on judges "bring[ing] an open mind to judging", as it is their professional responsibility.

== Exceptions to the doctrine of bias ==
=== Necessity ===
The doctrine of necessity is an exception to the rule against bias and operates to prevent a failure of justice. According to Anwar Siraj v. Tang I Fang (1982), necessity is the greatest single common law exception to the general rule that an adjudicator who appears to be biased or prejudiced must disqualify himself from participating in a proceeding. This rule is firmly established and is to the effect that disqualification of an adjudicator will not be permitted to destroy the only tribunal with power to act. The rule applies regardless of whether the disqualification arguably arises from the combination of prosecutorial and judicial functions, pecuniary interest, personal hostility or bias.

However, there are limitations to the rule of necessity. One suggested limitation is that the rule is inapplicable if the disqualification of a member will still leave a quorum of an administrative agency capable of acting. Another is that the rule of necessity will not justify an adjudicator sitting where actual bias can be shown.

=== Waiver ===
Upon disclosure that the judge may be biased, the parties to the suit may choose to request that the judge recuse himself and have the proceedings started before another judge. If the parties choose to proceed on with the claim without any objections to the judge, it stands to reason that a court will infer a waiver to the accusation of bias if either party had not raised an objection to bias at the commencement of a suit or at any time during it, following the approach taken by Locabail which was applied by the Federal Court of Malaysia in M. G. G. Pillai v. Tan Sri Dato' Vincent Tan Chee Yioun (2002).

In Locabail, Mrs. Emmanuel and her lawyers did nothing after the judge's disclosure of a conflict of interest and only sprung into action to complain about bias after learning she had failed in her claims. It was held that the law did not allow Mrs. Emmanuel to have the best of both worlds by waiting to see how her claims in litigation turned out before pursuing her complaint of bias. Similarly, in Pillai, although the applicant had knowledge of all matters grounding his complaint of bias before judgment was delivered, he only decided to complain after he had lost the appeal. The court found that if he had not lost, it was quite certain that he would not have filed the motion. The doctrine of waiver therefore militated firmly against him.

== See also ==
- Administrative law in Singapore
- Audi alteram partem
- Natural justice
- Nemo iudex in causa sua
