= Re Shankar Alan s/o Anant Kulkarni =

Administrative law judgment in Singapore

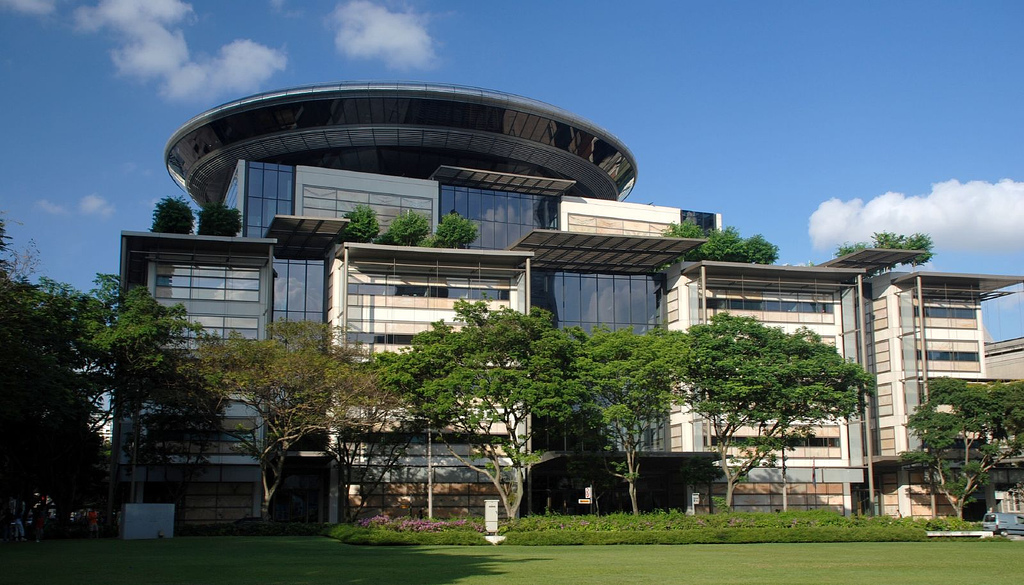
- The Supreme Court Building, photographed in February 2007
- Court: High Court of Singapore
- Full case name: Re Shankar Alan s/o Anant Kulkarni
- Decided: 27 October 2006
- Citations: [2006] SGHC 194, [2007] 1 S.L.R.(R.) 85

Court membership
- Judge sitting: Sundaresh Menon J.C.

Case opinions
- The applicable test for apparent bias is that of a "reasonable suspicion of bias", which is materially different from the test of a "real likelihood of bias".

Re Shankar Alan s/o Anant Kulkarni was a 2006 administrative law judgment in which the High Court of Singapore quashed a decision made by the Disciplinary Committee of the Law Society of Singapore against a lawyer, Alan Shankar s/o (son of) Anant Kulkarni. The Disciplinary Committee had found Shankar, who was a solicitor, guilty of grossly improper misconduct under the Legal Profession Act. Shankar applied to the High Court for judicial review on the ground that the Committee's ruling was affected by apparent bias.

Judicial Commissioner Sundaresh Menon considered the differences between two commonly used tests for apparent bias: the "real likelihood" and "reasonable suspicion" tests. He held that there were notable differences between the two tests, contrary to the previous view taken by a different High Court judge in Tang Kin Hwa v. Traditional Chinese Medicine Practitioners Board (2005). He took the view that the reasonable suspicion test was the applicable test in Singapore.

Two other legal issues were also considered, namely, whether the Disciplinary Committee had applied the wrong standard of proof, and whether it had shown a sufficient degree of detachment. Menon eventually decided the case in favour of Shankar and quashed the Committee's ruling.

== Facts and issues ==
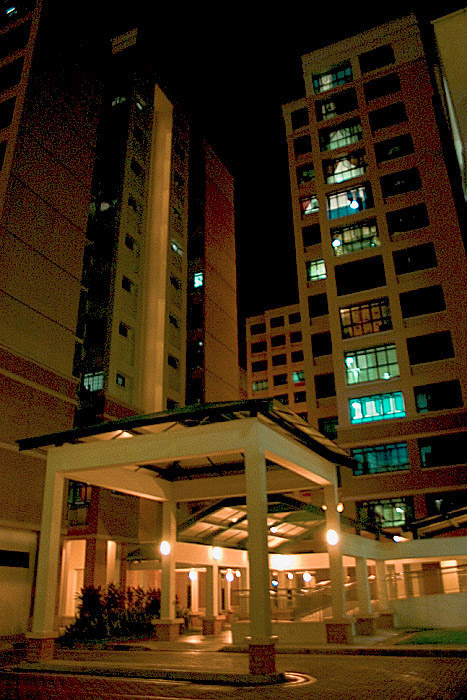
A night view of Housing and Development Board flats in Woodlands. The complainants' wish to sell their flat in this public housing estate eventually led to them complaining about their lawyer's conduct to the Law Society of Singapore. After the Law Society's Disciplinary Committee found the lawyer guilty of grossly improper conduct, he challenged this decision in the High Court by way of judicial review.

The complainants, Abdul Malik bin Sukor, an undischarged bankrupt, and his wife, Mislia binte Yusof, wished to sell their Housing and Development Board flat in Woodlands. They sought the help of a real estate agent named Rudolph Khoo, who informed them that Malik would have to be discharged from his bankruptcy before they could sell their flat. Khoo offered to help the complainants obtain a loan of S$25,000, to be repaid upon the sale of the flat. To facilitate these procedures, Khoo introduced a lawyer, Alan Shankar s/o (son of) Anant Kulkarni, to the complainants, who was to assist them in applying for a discharge from bankruptcy on Malik's behalf, acting for them in the sale of their flat, and documenting several loans that they had procured from one Chiang Bin Kwang.

The loans from Chiang were to be repaid with the proceeds from the sale of the flat. Following this, Mislia asked for two more loans from Chiang, which Shankar helped to arrange. In total, she signed three agreements to borrow a sum of $88,500, consisting of $45,000, $30,000 and $13,500 on three separate occasions. However, Mislia claimed she only received $40,000, consisting of $25,000, $10,000 and $5,000 on each of the occasions. Four years later, the complainants lodged a complaint against Shankar with the Law Society of Singapore. Following an investigation, Shankar was tried by the Disciplinary Committee of the Law Society and convicted of three counts of grossly improper conduct contrary to section 83(2)(b) of the Legal Profession Act. The charges were based on allegations that Shankar had acted for both the complainants and Chiang without advising the complainants of the consequences of this conflict of interest, that he had not taken full instructions from the complainants, that he had asked the complainants to sign documents without properly explaining their effect, and that he had not ascertained whether the sums of money that Chiang paid to Mislia were in line with the loan agreements.

During the Disciplinary Committee hearing, Mislia had testified that Chiang had issued her cheques for the first two loans, but that they had gone to Chiang's bank where he had cashed the cheques and then given her only part of the face value of the cheques. To counter this evidence, Shankar had called two bank employees as witnesses. He claimed that the Disciplinary Committee had questioned the bank witnesses more aggressively than the complainants or Shankar himself, and had essentially cross-examined the witnesses to induce them to make certain factual concessions which weakened Shankar's case.

Shankar sought an order from the High Court to quash the Disciplinary Committee's decision finding him guilty of the charges. The issues before the Court were:

- Whether the Disciplinary Committee had acted in a manner that gave rise to apparent bias or a reasonable suspicion of bias.
- Whether the Disciplinary Committee had maintained a degree of detachment necessary to give the applicant a fair trial.
- Whether the Disciplinary Committee had applied the wrong standard of proof during the inquiry.

The High Court found in favour of Shankar on the first and second issues, but not on the third issue due to insufficient evidence.

== Decision of the court ==
=== Test for apparent bias: reasonable suspicion v. real likelihood ===
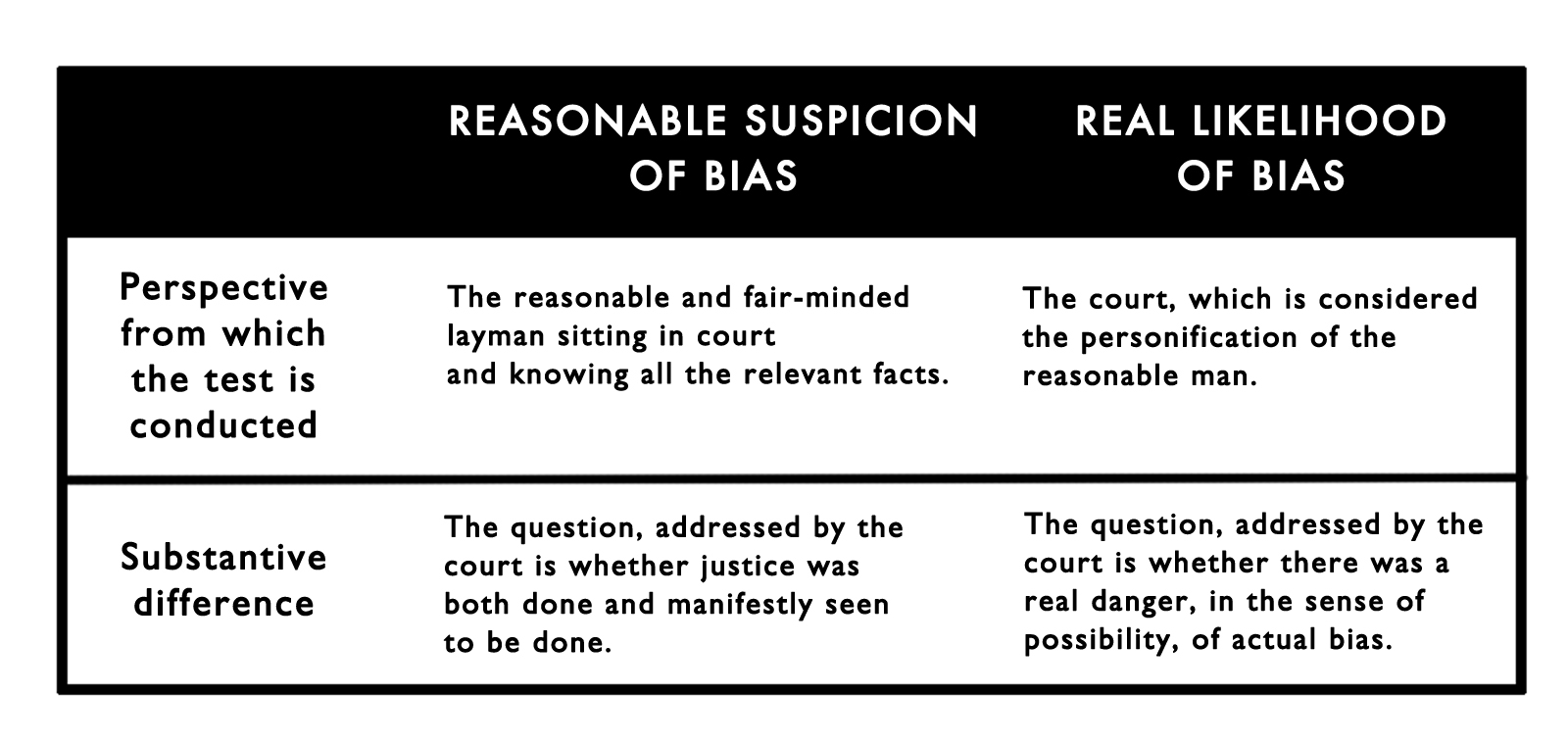
A table comparing the reasonable suspicion and real likelihood tests for apparent bias

The main ground of Shankar's judicial review application was apparent bias. Apparent bias occurs when there is an objective perception that an administrative or judicial body has decided, or would decide a matter unfairly, and it affords a basis for judicial review. At common law, there are two main tests to determine the presence or absence of apparent bias, namely the "reasonable suspicion of bias" and "real likelihood of bias" tests. A jurisdiction may adopt either of the two tests. The following definitions of the two tests were applied in Re Shankar:

- Real likelihood of bias test – whether the court is satisfied that there was a sufficient possibility that the administrative body was biased.
- Reasonable suspicion of bias test – whether a reasonable member of the public could harbour a reasonable suspicion of bias by the administrative body.

==== Position taken in Tang Kin Hwa ====
In Tang Kin Hwa v. Traditional Chinese Medicine Practitioners Board (2005), the High Court previously expressed the view that there was no material difference between the reasonable suspicion and real likelihood tests. Judicial Commissioner Andrew Phang held that the key question was whether a reasonable member of the public would perceive a real likelihood of bias, and that this was simply another way of saying that there would be a "reasonable suspicion" on the part of an objective observer. As such, he found no material difference between the two tests, although he specified that this was not a definitive finding and invited clarification from the Court of Appeal.

Judicial Commissioner Menon dedicated a significant portion of his decision to considering whether there was a material difference between the two tests. He eventually departed from the view in Tang Kin Hwa that both tests were the same, stating that while the tests might produce the same results in most cases, there were notable differences in the substance of both tests, as well as the perspective from which the court determines whether the test is satisfied.

==== Difference in perspectives ====
The inquiry into apparent bias, according to Judicial Commissioner Menon, should be based on the perspective of a reasonable member of the public. This is due to the need to ensure that decisions of courts and tribunals are beyond reproach in the eyes of the lay person. In holding thus, he quoted similar remarks made by the High Court of Australia in Johnson v. Johnson (2000), to the effect that impressions on the public must be considered since it is the public's confidence which has to be "won and maintained".

An examination of English cases led the judge to conclude that the "real likelihood" test no longer adopted this perspective. He considered that the case of R. v. Gough (1993) had shifted the perspective to be adopted – from that of the reasonable person, to that of the court. In Gough, the House of Lords held that there was no need to require courts to adopt the perspective of a reasonable person. This was because the court itself personified the reasonable person in such cases. Further, the court had to ascertain the circumstances from evidence available to it, even if that evidence might not be available to a member of the public at the relevant time. This stood in contrast to the holding in Metropolitan Properties Company (F.G.C.) Ltd. v. Lannon (1968), where Lord Denning, the Master of the Rolls, held that in applying the real likelihood test the inquiry was whether a reasonable man would think that there was bias, and not whether there was in fact bias. He added that "confidence is destroyed when right-minded people go away thinking ‘the judge was biased'".

As such, Judicial Commissioner Menon considered that the inquiry under the real likelihood test had been shifted from the perspective of a reasonable member of the public to that of a judge. He adopted the summary of this shift given by Lord Justice of Appeal Simon Brown in R. v. Inner West London Coroner, ex parte Dallaglio (1994): "[T]he court is no longer concerned strictly with the appearance of bias but rather with establishing the possibility that there was actual although unconscious bias." He also agreed with the Australian High Court's comments in Webb v. The Queen (1994) that the real likelihood test tended to emphasize the court's view of the facts, and placed irregular emphasis on public perception. As such, it differed in perspective from the reasonable suspicion test, which remained centered on the viewpoint of the reasonable member of the public.

==== Difference in substance ====
Aside from the difference in perspective, Judicial Commissioner Menon held that there was a difference of substance in terms of what the court had to consider under each test. He endorsed the holding of Justice William Deane in Webb that under the real likelihood test the court has to inquire into the existence of actual bias, with "possibility" as the required standard of proof. In contrast, under the reasonable suspicion test, the question is whether a member of the public would reasonably suspect that bias was afoot, even if the court itself was satisfied that there was no possible bias. The standard of proof for this test is the "balance of probabilities".

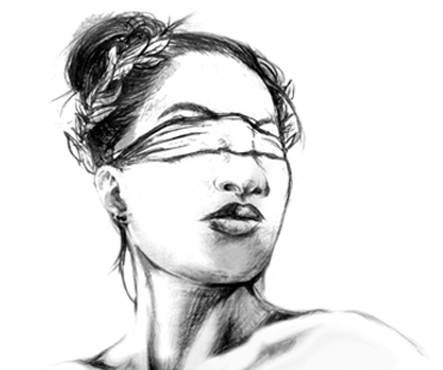
A drawing of Lady Justice. In R. v. Sussex Justices, ex parte McCarthy (1923), the court said that "justice should not only be done, but should manifestly and undoubtedly be seen to be done".

The case of R. v. Sussex Justices, ex parte McCarthy (1923) provides an illustration of the differences. In that case, the person who acted as clerk to certain magistrates was a member of a law firm that represented a party with an interest in the outcome of a matter being decided by the magistrates. When the magistrates withdrew to consider the matter, the clerk went with them in case they needed advice on any legal issues. However, the magistrates reached a decision without consulting the clerk. Thus, on the facts of the case, there was no possibility of actual bias whatsoever. Yet the decision in question was set aside because justice had to be seen to be done. Judicial Commissioner Menon highlighted that the underlying principle protected the appearance of justice being done, and reasoned that it would not be relevant under such a principle to consider whether justice was actually done. Nor did he think that Gough could be reconciled with ex parte McCarthy, despite the attempt in Gough attempt to confine the latter case to its own facts. In his view, the two tests were therefore different in substance, in addition to the different perspective that each test adopted. Furthermore, those differences were sometimes material in deciding a case; for example, the choice of the real likelihood test was a deciding factor of the result in Gough.

For these reasons, Judicial Commissioner Menon chose to depart from the views expressed in Tan Kin Hwa and held that there was indeed a material difference between both tests.

=== The law in Singapore: reasonable suspicion of bias test ===
After concluding that there were in fact differences between the two tests, Judicial Commissioner Menon went on to consider which was the applicable test in Singapore. He held that the reasonable suspicion test was preferable to the real likelihood test, and so chose to follow the line of Singapore cases before Shankar that endorsed the use of the reasonable suspicion test. The Court of Appeal had established in Jeyaretnam Joshua Benjamin v. Lee Kuan Yew (1992) that the applicable test in Singapore for apparent bias was the reasonable suspicion test. The judges held that the question to be asked under the test was: "Would a reasonable and fair-minded person sitting in court and knowing all the relevant facts have a reasonable suspicion that a fair trial for the applicant was not possible?"

However, Jeyaretnam was decided before the seminal English case of Gough, where the House of Lords altered the English position on apparent bias. Post-Gough, the Court of Appeal reconsidered the position in Singapore once more in Tang Liang Hong v. Lee Kuan Yew (1997). The Court regarded the test for apparent bias as "well settled" and, citing its previous judgment in Jeyaretnam, reaffirmed the reasonable suspicion test as the applicable test in Singapore. It found that no matter which test was applied, it made no substantial difference on the facts of the case.

In coming to his decision in the present case, Menon highlighted the principle upon which apparent bias stands as a ground for judicial review, separate from that of actual bias. Since justice is rooted in public confidence, it is imperative that "right-minded people" not hold the impression that "the judge was biased". The appearance of impartiality is as important as actual impartiality, because there is public interest in ensuring that justice is seen to be done. The reasonable suspicion test upholds this principle as it "safeguards not only the fact but also the appearance of justice being done". Thus he held this to be the more appropriate test because the inquiry is focused on whether a reasonable member of the public would have the impression that the public authority acted with bias, regardless of whether the court thought it likely or possible. On the other hand, the adoption of the real likelihood test would shift the focus of the inquiry from the perspective of a reasonable person to that of a judge who is no longer concerned strictly with the appearance of bias but rather with establishing whether there is in fact a sufficient possibility of bias.

Menon added that the real likelihood test poses an "inherent difficulty" because it is "utterly imprecise". This is because the standard of proof, being a question with respect to "possibility", is lower than that on a balance of probabilities which requires the court to be satisfied that "more likely than not" there was bias. Although in Gough Lord Goff of Chieveley stated that the test is satisfied if there is a sufficient degree of possibility of bias, what is "sufficient" is often subjective. The reasonable suspicion test, however, avoids this problem because the court is not inquiring into the degree of possibility of bias but toward the impression which a fair-minded member of the public could reasonably form on the facts presented.

Finally, Menon noted that Justice Chan Sek Keong previously suggested a different standard should apply to judicial decisions as opposed to administrative decisions, that is, those made by public authorities. He declined to make a definitive ruling on this point, although he opined that there was "much to commend this".

==== Application of the test ====
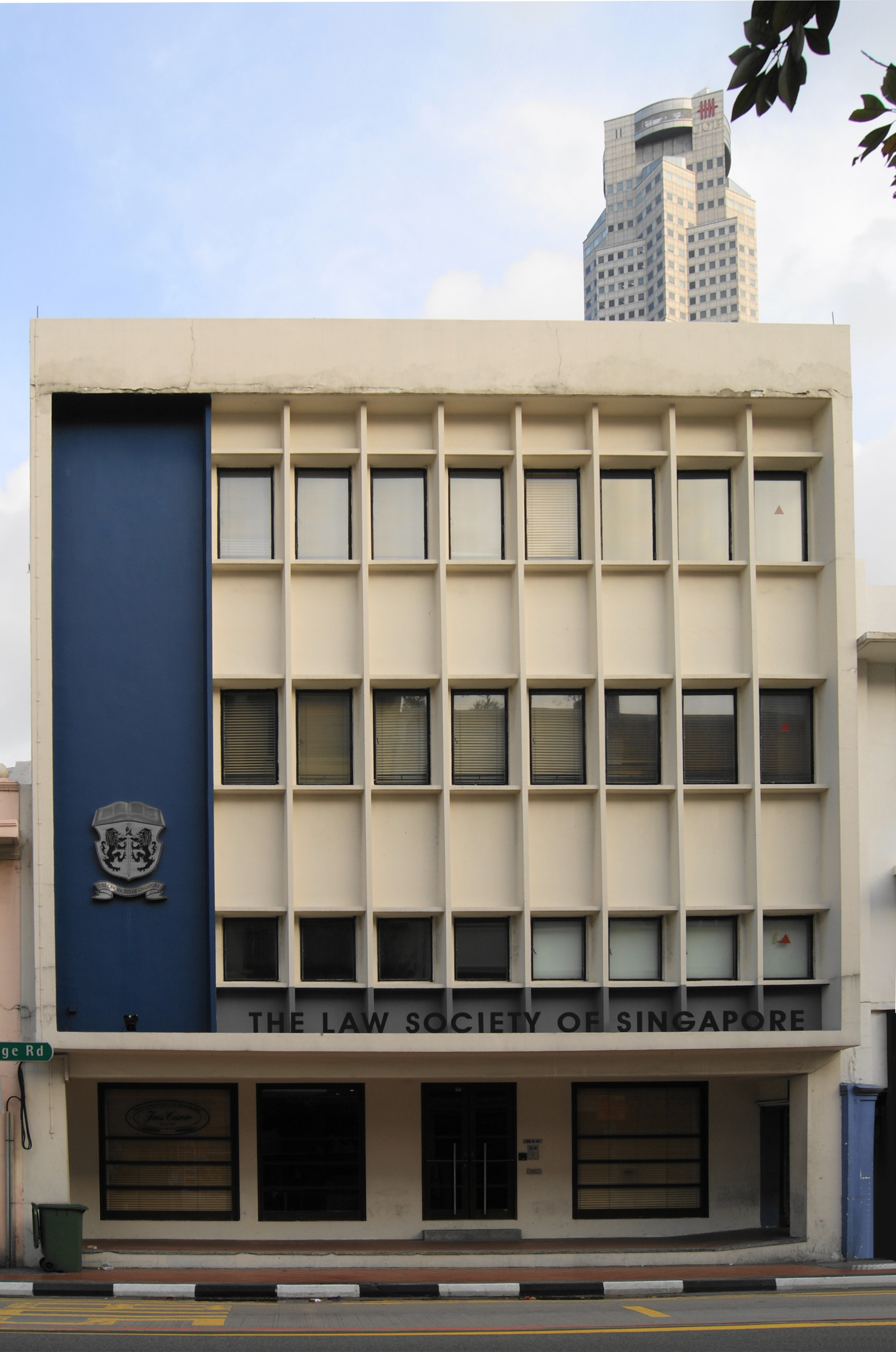
The headquarters of the Law Society of Singapore on South Bridge Road. In Shankar, Judicial Commissioner Sundaresh Menon held that the decision of the Society's Disciplinary Committee had to be quashed for apparent bias.

Having held that the test of reasonable suspicion of bias was the applicable test in Singapore, Judicial Commissioner Menon proceeded to apply it to the factual matrix of Shankar. After examining the facts and evidence, particularly the transcript of the Disciplinary Committee's questioning of the bank employees involved in the loan transaction, he was satisfied that there was indeed the presence of apparent bias on the part of Committee. The Committee had treated the complainants and the witnesses for the bank that had handled the money unequally. Furthermore, in questioning the witnesses about procedures and evidence, the Committee seemed to direct their line of inquisition towards attempting to coerce a response desirable to the Disciplinary Committee.

The suggestion in the Disciplinary Committee's final report that the bank's procedures in handling the loans had been bypassed by Chiang had in fact been brought up by the Committee itself. Counsel for the Law Society had not submitted that Chiang had influenced the bank in any way. In addition, the Committee found that it was "highly likely" that the bank's procedures had been flouted. This, according to Judicial Commissioner Menon, was significant because it went beyond the Law Society's submission that it was merely "possible" that the bank's procedures had been flouted.

The Disciplinary Committee had also disregarded the evidence of the bank witnesses, claiming that this was because the witnesses would have deliberately been untruthful in order to protect their employer from possible liabilities. However, the Committee did so without giving the witnesses a chance to address this presumption of dishonesty. The Committee also seemed to have disregarded the fact that a bank had an interest in following its own procedures to guard against possible liabilities.

Judicial Commissioner Menon also disagreed with the submission by counsel for the Law Society that to base the decision of bias solely on this cross-examination was taking too narrow a view of the case. He pointed out that the cross-examination had played a large part in Shankar's hearing, and had been relied on by the Disciplinary Committee to determine which set of evidence it chose to believe. Thus, such a focus on the cross-examination was necessary and crucial to the case. He further held that in any case, once a court had found that a reasonable suspicion of bias might arise, it could not be argued that there was no danger of harm because the matter that aroused the suspicion could be isolated. The principle that justice had to be seen to be done would still apply.

For these reasons, Judicial Commissioner Menon found for Shankar on this ground, and granted the quashing order that was sought.

=== Other issues ===
Aside from the issue on apparent bias, Shankar argued that the Disciplinary Committee's ruling should be invalidated on two other grounds, both of which were addressed by Judicial Commissioner Menon in his judgment.

==== Wrong standard of proof ====
Shankar argued that the ruling should be quashed on the basis that the Disciplinary Committee had applied the wrong standard of proof, and had thus made an error of law. He contended that the Committee's report failed to specify that it had applied the "beyond a reasonable doubt" standard of proof in its evaluation of the case.

Counsel for the Law Society raised two counterarguments to this point, both stemming from the fact that this was an application for judicial review. First, he argued that the High Court should be reluctant to exercise its powers of judicial review in this case, because Shankar had an alternative remedy in the form of show cause proceedings before a court of three judges. Secondly, he argued that evaluating whether the standard of proof was applied correctly would involve an examination of the merits of the Committee's decision, and such an examination of merits was not permitted in a judicial review case.

Addressing the first counterargument, Judicial Commissioner Menon held that show cause proceedings before the Court of Three Judges were not an alternative to judicial review, because the two forms of inquiry were different in nature. The court of three judges was allowed to examine the merits of the Committee's decision on the basis of the evidence presented, while judicial review was concerned with the legality of the entire decision-making process. Judicial review could thus be granted even if show cause proceedings were available. Menon thus declined to accept this submission, although he accepted that the availability of show cause proceedings was a factor to be considered by the court in deciding whether to grant judicial review.

In response to the second counterargument, Menon pointed out that the court, in exercising judicial review, had to ask if the Committee "directed itself to the right inquiry". This could involve the question of whether the right standard of proof was applied. Thus, evaluating whether the standard of proof was correctly applied did not fall outside the scope of judicial review. He clarified that the court would only exceed its scope of review if, after establishing that the Committee had embarked on the right inquiry, it went on to consider whether the Committee had reached the right conclusion.

However, Menon refused to conclude that the Committee had applied the wrong standard of proof, because there was insufficient evidence to do so. He agreed that the Committee's report did not explicitly state the standard of proof adopted, but held that this alone was insufficient to reach the conclusion that they had applied the wrong standard of proof.

==== Judge descending into the arena ====
Shankar also appealed on the ground that the Disciplinary Committee, by virtue of its excessive intervention in the case, had descended into the arena and adopted an inquisitorial role, which had impaired its judgment and ability to properly evaluate and weigh the evidence. In addressing this submission, Judicial Commissioner Menon noted that this was a wholly separate ground of appeal, although it often overlaps with the issue of apparent bias and courts do not always distinguish the two.

Menon found that the resolution of the complaint did not hinge on the risk of any impressions made on a fair-minded observer, but on the risk that by descending into the arena the judge may have impaired his or her ability to evaluate and weigh the arguments from both parties, thus causing the trial to be unfair. The judicial function entails judges asking whatever questions are necessary to ensure a thorough understanding of the facts and arguments in order to arrive at a just conclusion. Throughout this process, they must maintain judicial calm and detachment, without assuming the role of counsel. A judge could not take actions "aimed at securing evidence to justify a finding of guilt"; to do so would be to adopt an inquisitorial role, which was at odds with the adversarial process favoured by the common law.

Menon clarified that this adoption of an inquisitorial role differed from judges intervening actively and frequently in cases. He noted that frequent judicial intervention was common in this era, and was often of assistance to counsel. Such intervention was not undesirable or wrong. Problems would only arise when judges went so far as to slip into "the perils of self-persuasion".

The issue of a court descending into the arena and depriving a party of the right to a fair trial was also distinguished from that of prejudgment, as in Roseli bin Amat v. Public Prosecutor (1989). When a judge is found to have prejudged, he will not have an open mind and is likely to have determined issues adversely against a party before the presentation of a case. However, when he descends into the arena, he may not necessarily have taken sides before the hearing. The difference may lie in how actively the judge pursues this position and how he comes to be persuaded.

Menon concluded that due to, among other things, the Committee's manner of questioning, carelessness in evaluating evidence, and failure to allow witnesses a chance to defend their testimony, it had descended into the arena. Accordingly, he held that the application could be allowed on this alternative basis as well. He stressed that it was the totality of the circumstances, and not any particular fact, that had led him to this conclusion.

== Critical reception ==
Shankar has been well received by judges and commentators. It was followed by the High Court in the cases of Ng Chee Tiong Tony v. Public Prosecutor (2007) and Khong Kin Hoong Lawrence v. Singapore Polo Club (2014); and cited by the Court of Appeal in Law Society of Singapore v. Top Ten Entertainment Pte. Ltd. (2011), albeit only as authority for the proposition that the decisions of inquiry and disciplinary tribunals are subject to judicial review. It has also been praised by Professor Thio Li-ann as a "lucid and well-reasoned" judgment, and by Senior Counsel Chan Leng Sun, who noted that the courts have shown foresight in keeping to the same test which England eventually came back to, after going through "decades of wordcraft". The ruling in Shankar could apply to arbitrators, since Chan also pointed out that aside from judges the reasonable suspicion test for apparent bias has been applied to arbitrators as well, such as in Turner (East Asia) Pte. Ltd. v. Builders Federal (Hong Kong) Ltd. (1988).

The decision in Shankar was examined in detail in an article by Lionel Leo and Chen Siyuan. The authors question how accurately the reasonable suspicion test reflects the public's perspective, given that the test requires the court to look through the eyes of a reasonable observer in court who is familiar with the relevant facts, whereas most members of the public hear things from secondary sources.

Leo and Chen also suggest that the two tests are similar in most respects, with only a narrow gap between them, and would produce the same result in most cases. They caution that judges, rather than concerning themselves with the labels given to the tests for bias, should be wary of taking extraneous matters into consideration, no matter which test is applied. The case of Locabail (UK) Ltd. v. Bayfield Properties Ltd. (1999) identified two particular issues for judges to be mindful of – special knowledge and legal sophistication. The authors concluded their analysis by suggesting that the true importance of the matter lies not in which test is used, but in ensuring that judges have taken into account all relevant circumstances and excluded extraneous considerations which would not have been applicable to the general public.

== See also ==
- Administrative law in Singapore
- Doctrine of bias in Singapore law
- Procedural impropriety in Singapore administrative law
