= Ridge v Baldwin =

1964 House of Lords labour law case, relating to natural justice and judicial review

- Court: House of Lords
- Decided: 14 March 1963
- Citation: [1964] AC 40, [1963] UKHL 2

Court membership
- Judges sitting: Lord Reid, Lord Evershed, Lord Morris of Borth-y-Gest, Lord Hodson, and Lord Devlin

Ridge v Baldwin [1964] AC 40 was a UK labour law case heard by the House of Lords. The decision extended the doctrine of natural justice (procedural fairness in judicial hearings) into the realm of administrative decision making. As a result, the case has been described as "the landmark case" that opened up decisions taken by the UK executive to judicial review in English law.

== Facts ==
The Brighton police authority dismissed its Chief Constable (Charles Ridge) without offering him an opportunity to defend his actions. The Chief Constable appealed, arguing that the Brighton Watch Committee (headed by George Baldwin) had acted unlawfully (ultra vires) in terminating his appointment in 1958 following criminal proceedings against him.

Ridge also sought financial reparation from the police authority; having declined to seek reappointment, he sought a reinstatement of his pension, to which he would have been entitled with effect from 1960 had he not been dismissed, plus damages, or salary backdated to his dismissal.

== Judgment ==
The House of Lords held that Baldwin's committee had violated the doctrine of natural justice, overturning the principle outlined by the Donoughmore Committee thirty years before that the doctrine of natural justice could not be applied to administrative decisions.

== Significance ==
"Natural justice" is a legal doctrine which requires an absence of bias (nemo iudex in causa sua) and the right to a fair hearing (audi alteram partem). Ridge was the first time that the doctrine had been used to overturn a non-judicial (or quasi-judicial) decision.
