= R v Sussex Justices, ex parte McCarthy =

1924 English case law

- Court: High Court of Justice
- Cases cited: [1924] KB 256; [1923] EWHC KB 1

Court membership
- Judges sitting: Lord Hewart CJ, Lush and Sankey JJ

R v Sussex Justices, ex parte McCarthy ([1924] 1 KB 256, [1923] All ER Rep 233) is a leading English case on the impartiality and recusal of judges. It is famous as a legal precedent in establishing the principle that the mere appearance of bias is sufficient to overturn a judicial decision. It also brought into common parlance the oft-quoted aphorism "Not only must Justice be done; it must also be seen to be done."

== Facts ==
In 1923 McCarthy, a motorcyclist, was involved in a road accident which resulted in his prosecution before a magistrates' court for dangerous driving. Unknown to the defendant and his solicitor, the clerk to the justices was a member of the firm of solicitors acting in a civil claim against the defendant arising out of the accident that had given rise to the prosecution. The clerk retired with the justices, who returned to convict the defendant.

On learning of the clerk's provenance, the defendant applied to have the conviction quashed. The justices swore affidavits stating that they had reached their decision to convict the defendant without consulting their clerk.

== Judgment ==
The appeal was essentially one of judicial review and was heard at the King's Bench division by Lord Chief Justice Hewart. In a landmark and far-reaching judgement, Lord Hewart CJ said:

It is said, and, no doubt, truly, that when that gentleman retired in the usual way with the justices, taking with him the notes of the evidence in case the justices might desire to consult him, the justices came to a conclusion without consulting him, and that he scrupulously abstained from referring to the case in any way. But while that is so, a long line of cases shows that it is not merely of some importance but is of fundamental importance that justice should not only be done, but should manifestly and undoubtedly be seen to be done.

The question therefore is not whether in this case the deputy clerk made any observation or offered any criticism which he might not properly have made or offered; the question is whether he was so related to the case in its civil aspect as to be unfit to act as clerk to the justices in the criminal matter. The answer to that question depends not upon what actually was done but upon what might appear to be done.

Nothing is to be done which creates even a suspicion that there has been an improper interference with the course of justice. Speaking for myself, I accept the statements contained in the justices' affidavit, but they show very clearly that the deputy clerk was connected with the case in a capacity which made it right that he should scrupulously abstain from referring to the matter in any way, although he retired with the justices; in other words, his one position was such that he could not, if he had been required to do so, discharge the duties which his other position involved. His twofold position was a manifest contradiction.

In those circumstances I am satisfied that this conviction must be quashed, unless it can be shown that the applicant or his solicitor was aware of the point that might be taken, refrained from taking it, and took his chance of an acquittal on the facts, and then, on a conviction being recorded, decided to take the point. On the facts I am satisfied that there has been no waiver of the irregularity, and, that being so, the rule must be made absolute and the conviction quashed.

The ruling is derived from the principle of natural justice and has been followed throughout the world in countries that use the English legal system. It was applied in the Augusto Pinochet case, where the House of Lords overturned its own decision on the grounds of Lord Hoffman's conflict of interest. It has also been applied in a wide array of diverse situations, including immigration cases, professional disciplinary cases, and domestic tribunals, such as within members' clubs.

== See also ==
- R v Bow Street Metropolitan Stipendiary Magistrate Ex parte Pinochet Ugarte (No.2)
