= Audi alteram partem =

Latin legal phrase

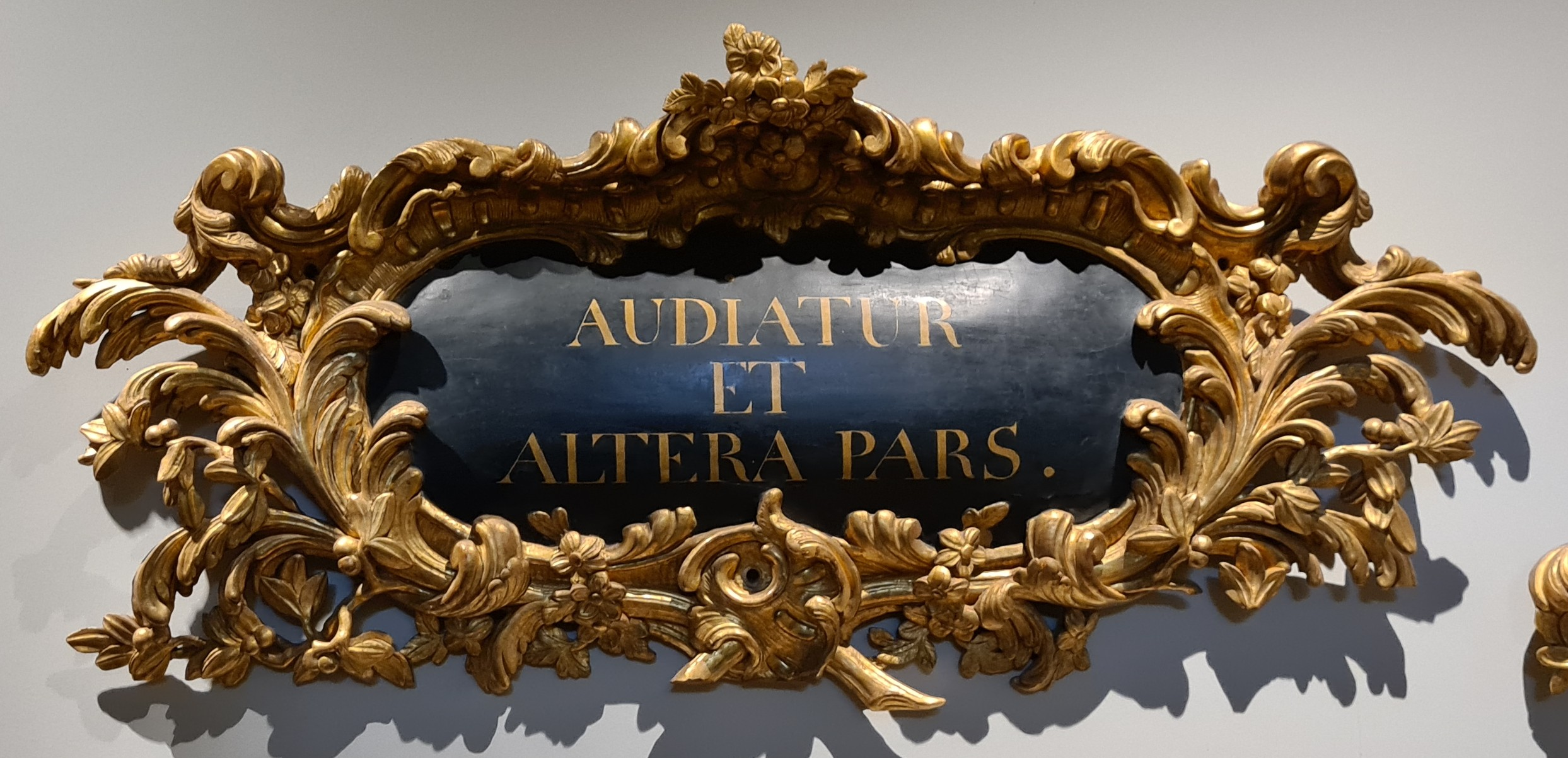
The phrase displayed at Bern Town Hall, Switzerland

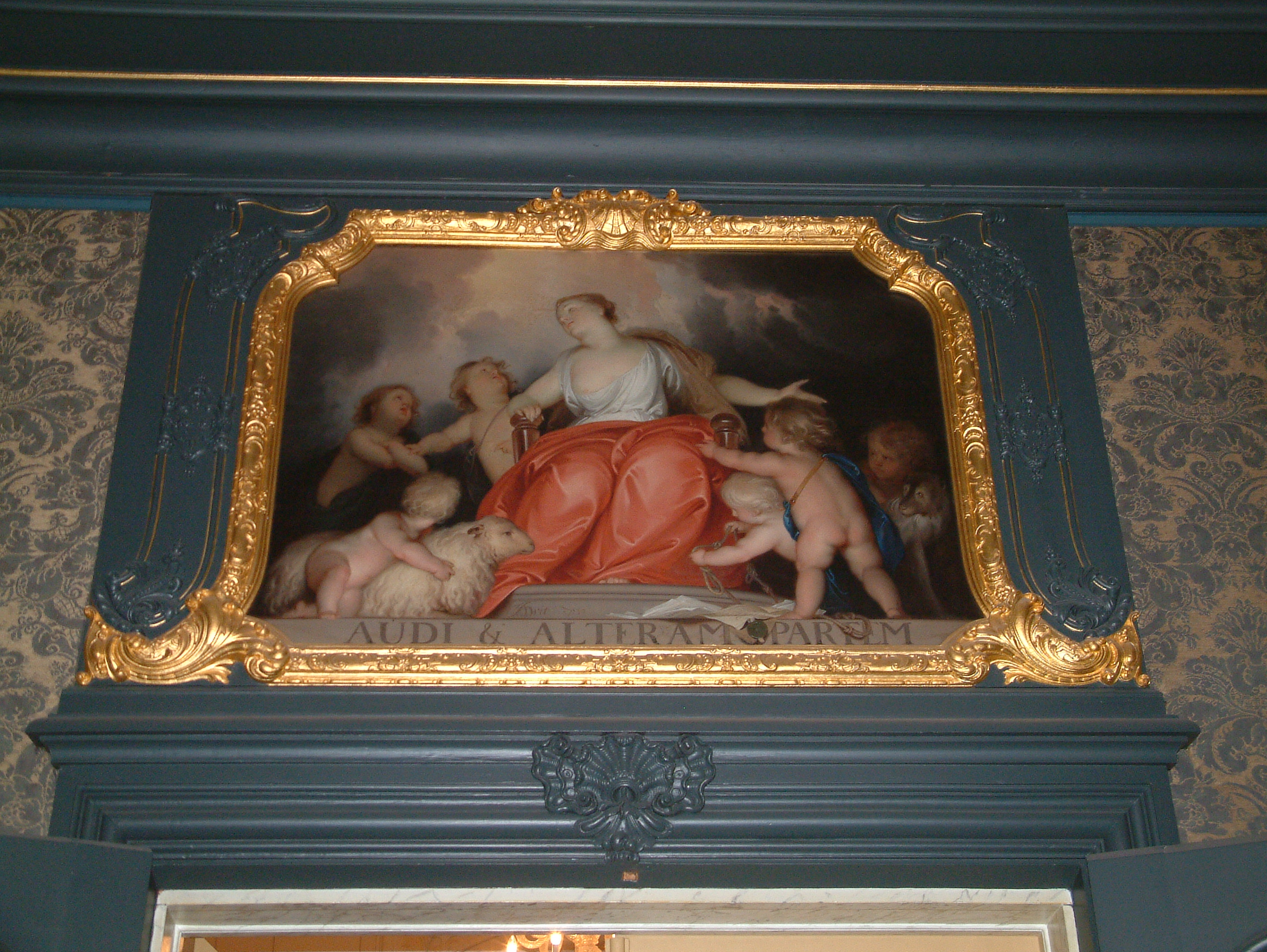
Decorative 18th century door piece from the Vierschaar (city tribunal) in City Hall of The Hague, by Jacob de Wit, illustrating audi alteram partem.

Audi alteram partem (or audiatur et altera pars) is a Latin phrase meaning "listen to the other side", or "let the other side be heard as well". It is the principle that no person should be judged without a fair hearing in which each party is given the opportunity to respond to the evidence against them.

"Audi alteram partem" is considered to be a principle of fundamental justice or equity or the principle of natural justice in most legal systems. This principle includes the rights of a party or its lawyers to confront the witnesses against them, to have a fair opportunity to challenge the evidence presented by the other party, to summon one's own witnesses and to present evidence, and to have counsel, if necessary at public expense, in order to make one's case properly.

== History of use ==
As a general principle of rationality in reaching conclusions in disputed matters, "Hear both sides" was treated as part of common wisdom by the ancient Greek dramatists. A similar principle can also be found in Islamic law, based on a hadith indicating that in litigation, both parties must be heard. The principle was referred to by the International Court of Justice in the Nuclear Tests case, referring to France's non-appearance at judgment. Modern legal systems differ on whether individuals can be convicted in absentia. The principle is used in labour law matters in countries like South Africa and Zimbabwe.

The phrase, in its Latin form, is the official motto of the Supreme Court of Illinois as well as the FSU (Free Speech Union) in Britain.

== See also ==
- Nemo iudex in causa sua
- Right of reply
- Trial in absentia
