= R v Bow Street Metropolitan Stipendiary Magistrate, ex parte Pinochet =

UK legal case

R (Pinochet Ugarte) v Bow St Magistrate
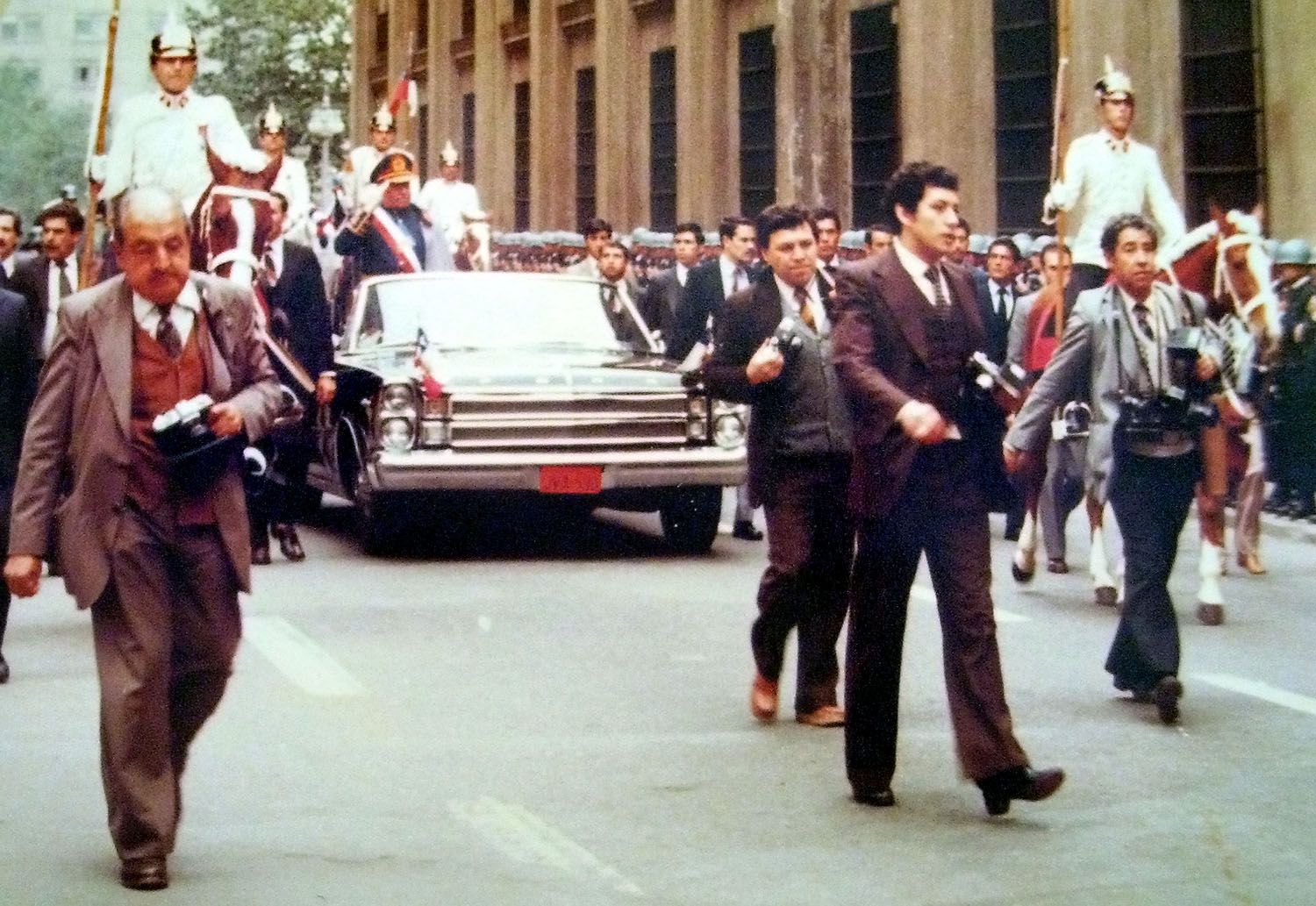
- Chilean dictator Augusto Pinochet
- Court: House of Lords
- Full case name: R v Bow Street Metropolitan Stipendiary Magistrate, ex parte Pinochet Ugarte
- Decided: 25 November 1998
- Citation: [1998] UKHL 41, [2000] 1 AC 61

Case history
- Prior actions: Augusto Pinochet Ugarte, [1999] 38 ILM 68 (Q.B. Div'l Ct. 1998)
- Subsequent actions: No 2 [1999] UKHL 52, [2000] 1 AC 119. No 3 [1999] UKHL 17, [2000] 1 AC 147.

Court membership
- Judges sitting: Lord Slynn, Lord Hoffmann, Lord Steyn, Lord Nicholls, Lord Lloyd, Lord Browne-Wilkinson, Lord Goff, Lord Hope, Lord Hutton, Lord Saville, Lord Millett, Lord Phillips

R (Pinochet Ugarte) v Bow St Metropolitan Stipendiary Magistrate [2000] 1 AC 61, 119 and 147 is a set of three UK constitutional law judgments by the House of Lords that examined whether former Chilean dictator Augusto Pinochet was entitled to claim state immunity from torture allegations made by a Spanish court and therefore avoid extradition to Spain. They have proven to be of landmark significance in international criminal law and human rights law.

In the first judgment, a panel of five judges ruled that Pinochet, as a former head of state, was not entitled to immunity from prosecution for the crimes of torture and could therefore be extradited to Spain to face charges. However, in a subsequent judgment (In re Pinochet, or Pinochet II) that was to prove controversial, the ruling was set aside following revelations that one of the Law Lords had links to one of the intervenors in the case, Amnesty International, thereby creating an appearance of bias. A new panel of judges (R v Bow Street Metropolitan Stipendiary Magistrate, ex parte Pinochet Ugarte (No 3), or Pinochet III) subsequently affirmed that Pinochet was not entitled to state immunity but that acts committed outside of British territories could only be prosecuted under national law if committed after the passage of section 134 of the Criminal Justice Act 1988 (which gave UK courts universal jurisdiction over crimes of torture).

== Facts ==
Pinochet had been accused by Spanish judge Baltazar Garzon of torture, a crime under international law that can be prosecuted in any country under the doctrine of universal jurisdiction. While on a visit to London for a medical treatment, Pinochet was arrested by British authorities following the issuance of an arrest warrant via Interpol by the Spanish judge. Pinochet's lawyers argued before a High Court panel presided by Lord Bingham that since Pinochet was head of state at the time of the alleged crimes, he was immune from the jurisdiction of British courts. The panel disagreed, ruling that Pinochet did not enjoy immunity from prosecution.

== Judgment ==
=== Pinochet (No 1) ===
By a 3–2 majority, Lord Nicholls, Lord Hoffmann and Lord Steyn ruled that Pinochet did not enjoy state immunity.

Notable passages of the judgment include the following:

... the development of international law since the Second World War justifies the conclusion that by the time of the 1973 coup d'état, and certainly ever since, international law condemned genocide, torture, hostage taking and crimes against humanity (during an armed conflict or in peacetime) as international crimes deserving of punishment. Given this state of international law, it seems to me difficult to maintain that the commission of such high crimes may amount to acts performed in the exercise of the functions of a Head of State.

... International law has made plain that certain types of conduct, including torture and hostage-taking, are not acceptable conduct on the part of anyone. This applies as much to heads of state, or even more so, as it does to everyone else. The contrary conclusion would make a mockery of international law.

Lord Slynn and Lord Lloyd dissented.

=== Pinochet (No 2) ===
In R v Bow Street Metropolitan Stipendiary Magistrate, ex parte Pinochet Ugarte (No 2), a new panel of judges, composed of Lord Browne-Wilkinson, Lord Goff, Lord Hope, Lord Hutton, Lord Saville, Lord Millett and Lord Phillips, set aside the first judgment on the grounds that an appearance of bias had been created, following revelations that one of the judges, Lord Hoffmann, had failed to disclose personal ties to Amnesty International, an intervenor in the case against Pinochet.

=== Pinochet (No 3) ===
In R v Bow Street Metropolitan Stipendiary Magistrate, ex parte Pinochet Ugarte (No 3), the House ruled that Pinochet did not enjoy immunity from prosecution for torture, but only as it applied after 8 December 1988, when section 134 of the Criminal Justice Act 1988, giving UK courts universal jurisdiction over crimes of torture, came into effect. Pinochet therefore could not be tried as it would constitute a retroactive law.

== See also ==
- UK constitutional law
- Augusto Pinochet's arrest and trial
- State immunity
