= Nemo iudex in causa sua =

Principle of natural justice

Nemo judex in causa sua (IPA: [ˈne.mo ˈju.dɛks in ˈkau̯.sa ˈsua]; also written as nemo [est] judex in sua causa, in propria causa, in re sua or in parte sua) is a Latin brocard that translates as "no one is judge in his own case". Originating from Roman law, it was crystallized into a phrase by Edward Coke in the 17th century and is now widely regarded as a fundamental tenet of natural justice and constitutionalism. It states that no one can judge a case in which they have an interest. In some jurisdictions, the principle is strictly enforced to avoid any appearance of bias, even when there is none. However, William Blackstone deemed such principles too bold unless alterable by legislative power.

== History ==
The Latin brocard nemo judex in causa sua has its origins in the Roman legal tradition and is codified within the Corpus Juris Civilis. In 376 AD, an imperial decree established the principle that "no one shall decide his own case or interpret the law for himself" (neminem sibi esse iudicem vel ius sibi dicere debere) (Code 3.5.1). Additionally, the Digest records Julianus's statement that "it is unfair for someone to be the judge of their own affairs" (iniquum est aliquem suae rei iudicem fieri) (Digest 5.1.15-17).

From these Roman sources, the principle has endured into modern times and can be traced in Martin Luther's 1526 work Whether Soldiers, Too, Can Be Saved (Niemand sol sein selbs Richter seyn, meaning "no one should be their own judge"), in Ulrich Zwingli's In Exodum (1527) in Jean Bodin's The Six Books of the Republic (1576) and in Hobbes's Leviathan (1651) ("And seeing every man is presumed to do all things in order to his own benefit, no man is a fit Arbitrator in his own cause").

In the 17th century, the English jurist Edward Coke turned the idea into a phrase when he wrote that "it is a maxim in law aliquis non debet esse iudex in propria causa". Coke used the principle to instruct the king that he could not personally judge a dispute between himself and his subject. Moreover, In the famous Bonham's Case of 1610 Coke ruled that the College of Physicians could not sit as judges in a case to which they were a party, and he was understood also to have affirmed that the principle could not be overridden by statutory provision.

In 1701, Lord Chief Justice John Holt wrote: "it is impossible that one should be judge and party, for the judge is to determine between party and party, or between the government and the party; and an act of parliament can do no wrong, though it may do several things that look pretty odd...." In 1791, James Wilson commented on this subject:

My Lord Chief Justice Holt expresses himself, upon this delicate and embarrassing subject, in his usual blunt and decided manner: "It is a very reasonable and true saying, that if an act of parliament should ordain, that the same person should be a party and a judge, or, which is the same thing, judge in his own cause; it would be a void act of parliament; for it is impossible that one should be judge and party; for the judge is to determine between party and party, or between the government and the party; and an act of parliament can do no wrong; though it may do several things, that look pretty odd."

These doctrines and sayings, however reasonable and true they appear to be, have been, nevertheless, deemed too bold; for they are irreconcilable with the lately introduced positions concerning the supreme, absolute, and uncontrollable power of the British parliament. Accordingly, Sir William Blackstone, on the principles of his system, expresses himself in the following manner, remarkably guarded and circumspect, as to the extent of the parliamentary power. "If there arise out of acts of parliament, collaterally, any absurd consequences, manifestly contradictory to common reason; they are, with regard to those collateral consequences, void. I lay down the rule with these restrictions; though I know it is generally laid down more largely--that acts of parliament contrary to reason are void. But if the parliament will positively enact a thing to be done, which is unreasonable; I know of no power that can control it: and the examples usually alleged in support of this sense of the rule do none of them prove, that, where the main object of a statute is unreasonable, the judges are at liberty to reject it: for that were to set the judicial power above that of the legislature, which would be subversive of all government." "No court has power to defeat the intent of the legislature, when couched in such evident and express words, as to leave no doubt concerning its intention."

Since then, according to Adrian Vermeule, this rule against bias has been recognised as a fundamental tenet of natural justice in the common law tradition and a cornerstone of constitutionalism, although Vermeule characterizes it as "an exaggerated and misleading half-truth". The maxim has been invoked by the United States Supreme Court in various cases, such as the 1798 case Calder v. Bull ("a law that makes a man a Judge in his own cause ... is against all reason and justice") and the 1974 case Arnett v. Kennedy ("we might start with a first principle: '[N]o man shall be a judge in his own cause.' Bonham's Case, 8 Co. 114a, 118a, 77 Eng. Rep. 646, 652 (1610)").

== See also ==
- Audi alteram partem
- Judicial disqualification
- List of legal Latin terms
- Brocard (law)

== Sources ==
- Gedicks, Frederick Mark (2009). "An Originalist Defense of Substantive Due Process: Magna Carta, Higher-Law Constitutionalism, and the Fifth Amendment". Emory Law Journal. 58. Emory University School of Law: 585–674.
- Malysz, Piotr J. (2007). "Nemo iudex in causa sua as the Basis of Law, Justice, and Justification in Luther's Thought". The Harvard Theological Review. 100 (3). Cambridge University Press: 363–386. doi:10.1017/S0017816007001629. JSTOR 4495123.
- Vermeule, Adrian (2012). "Contra "Nemo Iudex in Sua Causa": The Limits of Impartiality". The Yale Law Journal. 122 (2). Yale Law Journal Company, Inc.: 384–420. ISSN 0044-0094. JSTOR 23527920.
- Yale, D. E. C. (1974). "Iudex in Propria Causa: An Historical Excursus". The Cambridge Law Journal. 33 (1). Cambridge University Press: 80–96. doi:10.1017/S0008197300091297. JSTOR 4505744.
