= Asa (given name) =

Asa: [pronounced ae-sah] describes a god

- Gender: Male, Female
- Language: Various

Origin
- Meaning: Various

Asa is a given name in several parts of the world. In English, the usual pronunciation is /ˈeɪsə/ or /ˈeɪzə/.

- Asa (אסא): derived from the Hebrew language, as the name appears in the Old Testament to designate the third King of Judah, who reigned for forty years. It became a popular American name because of the influence of the Puritans in the 17th century.
- Asa: a Hebrew name meaning healer and/or physician (Ase).
- Åsa (pronounced "o-sa"): a Swedish name related to one of the most ancient Norse names, referencing Æsir, which means "gods".
- Asa (pronounced "asha"): a Yoruba language word which means or refers to the 'hawk' bird.
- Asa (pronounced "aa-saa"): an Igbo Nigerian name with the meaning "Beautiful”
- Asa (朝 or あさ) (pronounced "aa-saa"): Japanese name meaning "morning".
- Asa: Indonesian for "Hope".
- Asa: Portuguese means "Wing".
- Asa: Malagasy means "Work."
- Asha: Nepali means "Hope"
- Asa: Punjabi means “Hope”
- Asa: Filipino means “Hope”.

== People ==
- Asa (rapper) (born 1980), Finnish rapper, record producer and singer
- Asa Aarons (born 1956), American consumer reporter, photojournalist
- Asa Adgate (1767–1832), American iron manufacturer, farmer, and local government official
- Asa Aikens (1788–1863) American attorney, politician and judge
- Asa Akira (born 1985) American pornographic film actress, writer and adult film director
- Asa Aldis (1770–1847) American attorney, politician and judge
- Asa Allworth Burnham (1808–1873) Ontario farmer and political figure
- Asa Ames (1823–1851) American artist
- Asa Amone (born 1966), Tongan former dual code international rugby union and rugby league footballer
- Asa Ando (born 1996) Japanese alpine ski racer
- Asa Andrew (born 1971), American doctor and radio host
- Asa Asika (born 1990) Nigerian talent manager
- Asa B. Carey (1835–1912) American career officer
- Asa Baber (1936–2003), American author and Playboy columnist
- Asa Bafaqih (1918–1978) Indonesian journalist, diplomat, and politician
- Åsa Beckman (born 1961) Swedish literary critic
- Asa Beebe Cross (1826–1894) American architect
- Asa Belknap Foster (1817–1877) Quebec businessman and political figure
- Asa Benveniste (1925–1990) American-born poet, typographer and publisher
- Ása Berglind Hjálmarsdóttir (born 1984), Icelandic politician
- Asa Betham (c. 1838 – unknown) American sailor in the U.S. Navy during the American Civil War
- Asa Biggs (1811–1878), American politician
- Asa Binns (1873–1946) British mechanical and civil engineer
- Asa Bird Gardiner (1839–1919) American soldier, attorney and district attorney
- Åsa Bjerkerot (born 1959) Swedish actor, comedian, writer and film director
- Asa Blanchard (born 1770/1787-1838) American silversmith and clockmaker
- Asa Bowen Smith (born 1809–1886), American Congregational missionary
- Asa Brainard (born 1841–1888), American ace pitcher
- Asa Briggs (1921–2016), British historian
- Asa Brigham (1788–1844) Texas politician, businessman and signer
- Asa Burton (1752–1836) American minister and theologian
- Asa Butterfield (born 1997), British actor
- Asa C. Matthews (1833–1908) American lawyer, judge and politician
- Asa Chapman (1770–1825), justice of the Connecticut Supreme Court
- Asa Charlton (born 1977) English footballer
- Asa Cheffetz (1896–1965) American artist and printmaker
- Asa Child (1798–1858) American attorney
- Asa Clapp (merchant) (1762–1848) American merchant and politician
- Asa Clapp (politician) (1805–1891) United States representative from Maine
- Asa Coleman (1830s–1893) American politician and former slave
- Asa Coon (1993–2007), perpetrator of the 2007 SuccessTech Academy shooting
- Asa Cristina Laurell (born 1943) Mexican sociologist
- Asa D. Watkins (1856–1938) American judge and politician
- Asa Daklugie (born abt. 1869–1955) Chief of the Nedni Apaches
- Asa Danforth (1746–1818) father of salt manufacturer and early settler in Onondaga County, New York
- Asa Danforth Jr. (1768–1818/1821) was one of the first citizens of Onondaga County
- Asa Dodge Smith (1804–1877) American Presbyterian preacher
- Asa Dogura (1914–2008) Japanese sprinter
- Åsa Domeij (born 1962) Swedish Green Party politician and an agronomist by training
- Asa Drury (1801–1870) American Baptist minister and educator primarily
- Asa Earl Carter (1925–1979), American segregationist, Ku Klux Klan leader and Western novelist
- Asa Eldridge (1809–1856) American sea captain from Yarmouth, Massachusetts
- Åsa Elfving (born 1970) Swedish former ice hockey player
- Asa Ellis (1817–1890) member of the 1867-69 California State Assembly
- Åsa Elvik (born 1979) Norwegian politician for the Socialist Left Party (SV)
- Åsa Elzén (born 1972) Swedish artist
- Asa Enami (born 2006), Japanese-born K-pop artist and member of Babymonster
- Asa Faulkner (1802–1886) American businessman and politician
- Asa Finley (1788–1853) American local judge and then state legislator politician
- Asa Fitch (1809–1879) American natural historian and entomologist
- Asa Fitch (politician) (1765–1843) U.S. representative from New York
- Asa Fowler (1811–1885) New Hampshire politician, lawyer and jurist
- Asa G. Candler Jr. (1880–1953) American businessman
- Asa G. Wiley (1911–1995) American football and wrestling coach
- Asa G. Yancey Sr. (1916–2013) American physician who is professor emeritus, former medical director
- Asa Germann (born 1997) American actor
- Åsa Gottmo (born 1971) Swedish professional golfer
- Asa Grant Hilliard III (1933–2007) African-American professor of educational psychology
- Asa Gray (1810–1888), American botanist
- Asa Griggs Candler (1851–1929), founder of the Coca-Cola company
- Asa Grover (1819–1887) United States representative from Kentucky
- Asa Guevara (born 1995) Trinidad and Tobago sprinter
- Asa S. Bushnell (governor) (1834–1904), American politician, 40th Governor of Ohio
- Asa Hall (born 1986), English footballer
- Asa Hartford (born 1950), Scottish football player and coach
- Asa Higuchi (born 1970), Japanese manga artist
- Asa Hutchinson (born 1950), American politician and lawyer
- Asa Jackson (born 1989), American football player
- Asa Jennings (1877–1933), American Methodist pastor who evacuated 350,000 Greeks and others from Turkey
- Asa Kasher (born 1940), Israeli philosopher and linguist
- Asa Keisar (born 1973), Israeli Jewish advocate for veganism
- Asa Lanova (1933–2017), Swiss dancer and author
- Asa Lovejoy (1808–1882), American businessman and politician
- Asa Mader (born 1975), American film director, screenwriter and visual artist
- Asa C. Matthews (1833–1908), American lawyer, judge and politician
- Asa Matsuoka (1893–1980), Japanese philanthropist and cultural ambassador
- Asa Harmon McCoy (died 1865), brother of Randolph McCoy and alleged first victim in the Hatfield-McCoy feud
- Asa Messer (1769–1836), American Baptist clergyman and educator; President of Brown University from 1804 to 1826
- Asa Newell (born 2005), American basketball player
- Asa Nonami (born 1960), Japanese crime fiction and horror writer
- Asa Packer (1805–1879), American businessman and politician
- A. Philip Randolph (1889–1979), African-American leader of the Civil Rights Movement and founder of the first black labor union in the U.S.
- Asa Robinson, rugby league footballer
- Asa Taccone (born 1983), lead singer of indie rock band Electric Guest
- Asa Turner (American football), American college football player
- Asa Wentworth Tenney (1833–1897), US federal judge
- Asa Wentworth Jr. (1797–1882), American businessman and politician
- Asa Whitney (1797–1874), American merchant and transcontinental railroad promoter
- Asa Yoelson (1886–1950), birth name of Al Jolson, singer and actor
- Prince Asa (572–645), was the eldest son of King Wideok of Baekje

== Biblical reference ==
- Asa of Judah, third king of Judah, son of Abijam, grandson of Rehoboam

== Fictional characters ==
- Asa the Black Monk, a character in The Devil and Daniel Webster
- Dr. Asa Breed, a character in Cat's Cradle
- Asa Fell, in season 3 of the TV show, Good Omens.
- Asa Buchanan, in the American soap opera One Life to Live
- Asa Griffiths, in the novel An American Tragedy by Theodore Dreiser
- Asa Hawks, in the novel Wise Blood by Flannery O'Connor and the film of the same name.
- Asa Heshel, in the novel The Family Moskat.
- Asa "Asey" Mayo, in the mystery novel series by Phoebe Atwood Taylor
- Asa Mitaka (三鷹アサ), a character in the Chainsaw Man manga series
- Asa Phelps, in The Simpsons episode "Raging Abe Simpson and His Grumbling Grandson in 'The Curse of the Flying Hellfish'"
- Asa Pike, in the young adult novel series, Charlie Bone
- Asa Shigure, in the Shuffle! media franchise
- Asa Trenchard, in the play Our American Cousin by Tom Taylor (dramatist)
- Asenath Waite, a character in H. P. Lovecraft's short story The Thing on the Doorstep
- Asa Waite, a character in the movie Suitable Flesh

== See also ==
- Asa (disambiguation)
- Åsa (disambiguation)
- Aza (disambiguation)
- Assa (name)
