= Assa =

Assa may refer to:

== Places ==
- Assa (Chalcidice), a town of Chalcidice in ancient Macedonia, Greece
- Assa, Morocco, a town in Southern Morocco in the Jbel Ouarkziz
- Asa River (Kazakhstan), river in Kyrgyzstan and Kazakhstan
- Assa (river), river in Georgia and Russia

== Other ==
- "Assa", a 2020 song by Cignature
- Assa (film), a Soviet 1987 film by Sergei Solovyov, which is associated with Russian rock
- Assa (frog), a genus of pouched frogs in the family Myobatrachidae
- Assa (name), a given name and surname
- Assa Abloy, Swedish manufacturer of locks and security doors
- Asa language, alternative spelling for Aasáx, the language of the Assa people
- Asa people, a people of northern Tanzania

== See also ==
- ASSA (disambiguation)
