= Metropolitan Properties Co (FGC) Ltd v Lannon =

UK legal case on judicial bias

Metropolitan Properties Co (FCG) Ltd v Lannon
- Court: Court of Appeal
- Decided: 12 June 1968
- Citation: [1968] EWCA Civ 5, [1969] 1 QB 577
- Transcript

Court membership
- Judges sitting: Lord Denning M.R, Lord Danckwerts and Lord Edmund Davies

Metropolitan Properties Co (FCG) Ltd v Lannon was a United Kingdom constitutional law case concerning natural justice.

== Facts ==
The case concerned a rent assessment committee that suggested a lower rate of rent than what had been suggested by an expert, and even lower than the residents had expected. The landlords appealed against this decision under section 9 of the Tribunals and Inquiries Act 1958, on the basis that a member of the committee, Mr Lannon, was biased. They argued that Mr Lannon made the decision to assist his father, who was negotiating his rent with one of the appellant landlords. On this basis, they believed the decision ought to be quashed.

== Judgement ==
The court could not actually find any evidence that Mr Lannon himself was biased but Lord Denning emphasised that what is important is that there is no appearance of bias, stating:

The Court will not inquire whether he did, in fact, favour one side unfairly. Suffice it that reasonable people might think he did. The reason is plain enough. Justice must be rooted in confidences and confidence is destroyed when right-minded people go away thinking: "The Judge was biased".

On this basis, the court ruled that Mr Lannon should not have taken his role on the committee, and quashed the decision.

== See also ==
- Dimes v Grand Junction Canal
- Natural justice
- R v Bow Street Metropolitan Stipendiary Magistrate, ex parte Pinochet
