= Assa (name) =

Assa is both a given name and a surname. Notable people with the name include:

== Given name ==
- Assa Koïta (born 1991), French rugby union player
- Assa Singh, plaintiff in the 1969 Malaysian legal case Assa Singh v Menteri Besar of Johore
- Assa Sylla (born 1996), French actress and writer
- Assa Traoré (born 1985), French activist

== Surname ==
- Nadia Akpana Assa (born 1995), Norwegian athlete
- Yerahmiel Assa (1919–2011), Israeli politician

== See also ==
- Asa (given name)
