= Natural justice =

Concept in UK law

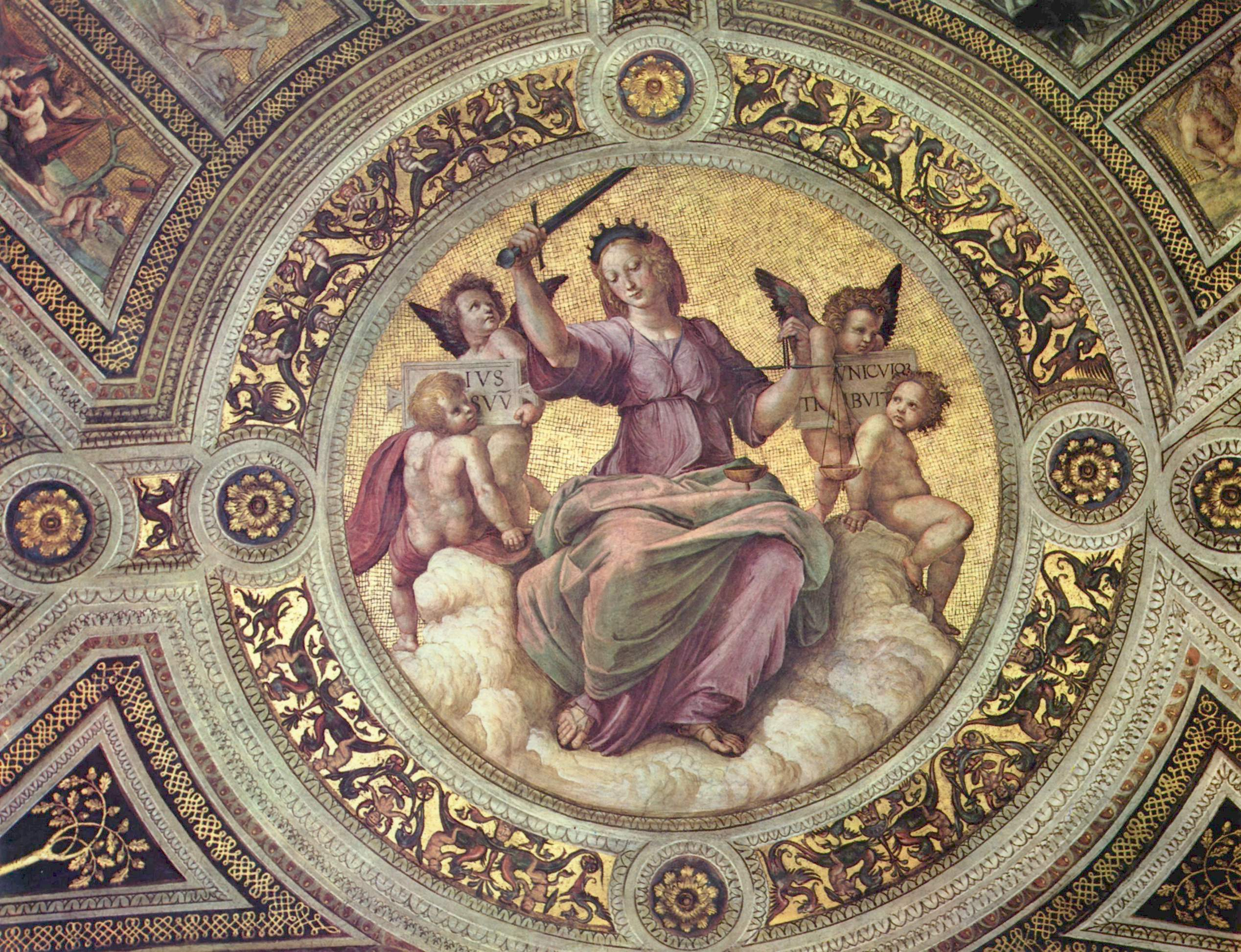
A tondo of an allegory of justice (1508) by Raphael in the Stanza della Segnatura (Room of the Apostolic Signatura) of the Apostolic Palace, Vatican City

In English law, natural justice is technical terminology for the rule against bias (nemo iudex in causa sua) and the right to a fair hearing (audi alteram partem). While the term natural justice is often retained as a general concept, it has largely been replaced and extended by the general "duty to act fairly".

The basis for the rule against bias is the need to maintain public confidence in the legal system. Bias can take the form of actual bias, imputed bias, or apparent bias. Actual bias is very difficult to prove in practice whereas imputed bias, once shown, will result in a decision being void without the need for any investigation into the likelihood or suspicion of bias. Cases from different jurisdictions currently apply two tests for apparent bias: the "reasonable suspicion of bias" test and the "real likelihood of bias" test. One view that has been taken is that the differences between these two tests are largely semantic and that they operate similarly.

The right to a fair hearing requires that individuals should not be penalized by decisions affecting their rights or legitimate expectations unless they have been given prior notice of the case, a fair opportunity to answer it, and the opportunity to present their own case. The mere fact that a decision affects rights or interests is sufficient to subject the decision to the procedures required by natural justice. In Europe, the right to a fair hearing is guaranteed by Article 6(1) of the European Convention on Human Rights, which is said to complement the common law rather than replace it.

== Background ==
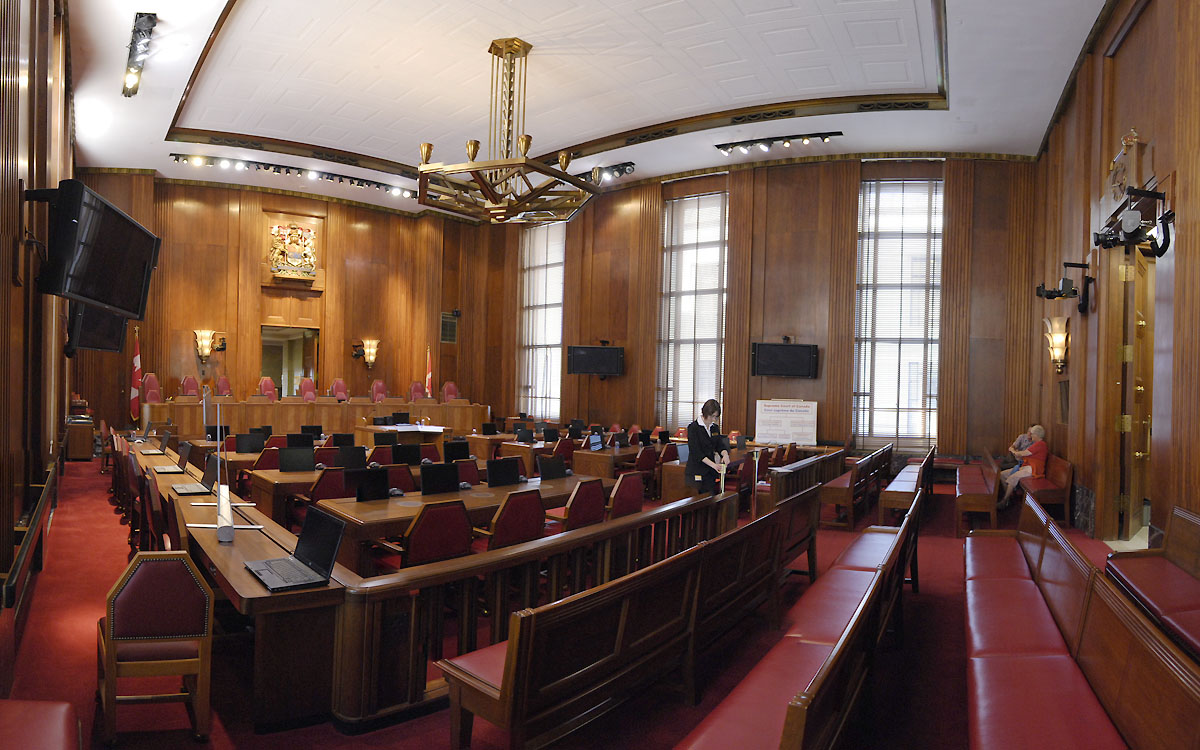
The courtroom of the Supreme Court of Canada in Ottawa, Ontario. In 1999, the Court ruled in Baker v Canada (Minister of Citizenship and Immigration) that the requirements of natural justice vary according to the context of the matter arising.

Natural justice is a term of art that denotes specific procedural rights in the English legal system and the systems of other nations based on it. It is similar to the American concepts of fair procedure and procedural due process, the latter having roots that to some degree parallel the origins of natural justice.

Although natural justice has an impressive ancestry and is said to express the close relationship between the common law and moral principles, the use of the term today is not to be confused with the "natural law" of the Canonists, the mediaeval philosophers' visions of an "ideal pattern of society" or the "natural rights" philosophy of the 18th century. Whilst the term natural justice is often retained as a general concept, in jurisdictions such as Australia, and the United Kingdom, it has largely been replaced and extended by the more general "duty to act fairly". Natural justice is identified with the two constituents of a fair hearing, which are the rule against bias (nemo iudex in causa sua, or "no man a judge in his own cause"), and the right to a fair hearing (audi alteram partem, or "hear the other side").

The requirements of natural justice or a duty to act fairly depend on the context. In Baker v Canada (Minister of Citizenship and Immigration) (1999), the Supreme Court of Canada set out a list of non-exhaustive factors that would influence the content of the duty of fairness, including the nature of the decision being made and the process followed in making it, the statutory scheme under which the decision-maker operates, the importance of the decision to the person challenging it, the person's legitimate expectations, and the choice of procedure made by the decision-maker.

Earlier, in Knight v Indian Head School Division No 19 (1990), the Supreme Court held that public authorities which make decisions of a legislative and general nature do not have a duty to act fairly, while those that carry out acts of a more administrative and specific nature do. Preliminary decisions will generally not trigger the duty to act fairly, but decisions of a more final nature may have such an effect.

Whether a duty to act fairly applies depends on the relationship between the public authority and the individual. No duty exists where the relationship is one of master and servant, or where the individual holds office at the pleasure of the authority. On the other hand, a duty to act fairly exists where the individual cannot be removed from office except for cause. Finally, a right to procedural fairness only exists when an authority's decision is significant and has an important impact on the individual.

== Rule against bias ==
=== In general ===
People are barred from deciding any case in which bias exists or bias may fairly be suspected. This principle embodies the basic concept of impartiality, and applies to courts of law, tribunals, arbitrators and all those having the duty to act judicially. A public authority has a duty to act judicially whenever it makes decisions that affect people's rights or interests, and not only when it applies some judicial-type procedure in arriving at decisions.

The basis on which impartiality operates is the need to maintain public confidence in the legal system. The erosion of public confidence undermines the nobility of the legal system and leads to ensuing chaos. The essence of the need for impartiality was observed by Lord Denning, the Master of the Rolls, in Metropolitan Properties Co (FGC) Ltd v Lannon (1968): "Justice must be rooted in confidence and confidence is destroyed when right-minded people go away thinking: 'The judge was biased.'"

Public confidence as the basis for the rule against bias is also embodied in the often-quoted words of Lord Hewart, the Lord Chief Justice of England and Wales, that "[i]t is not merely of some importance, but of fundamental importance that justice should not only be done, but should manifestly be seen to be done".

=== Forms of bias ===
==== Actual and imputed bias ====
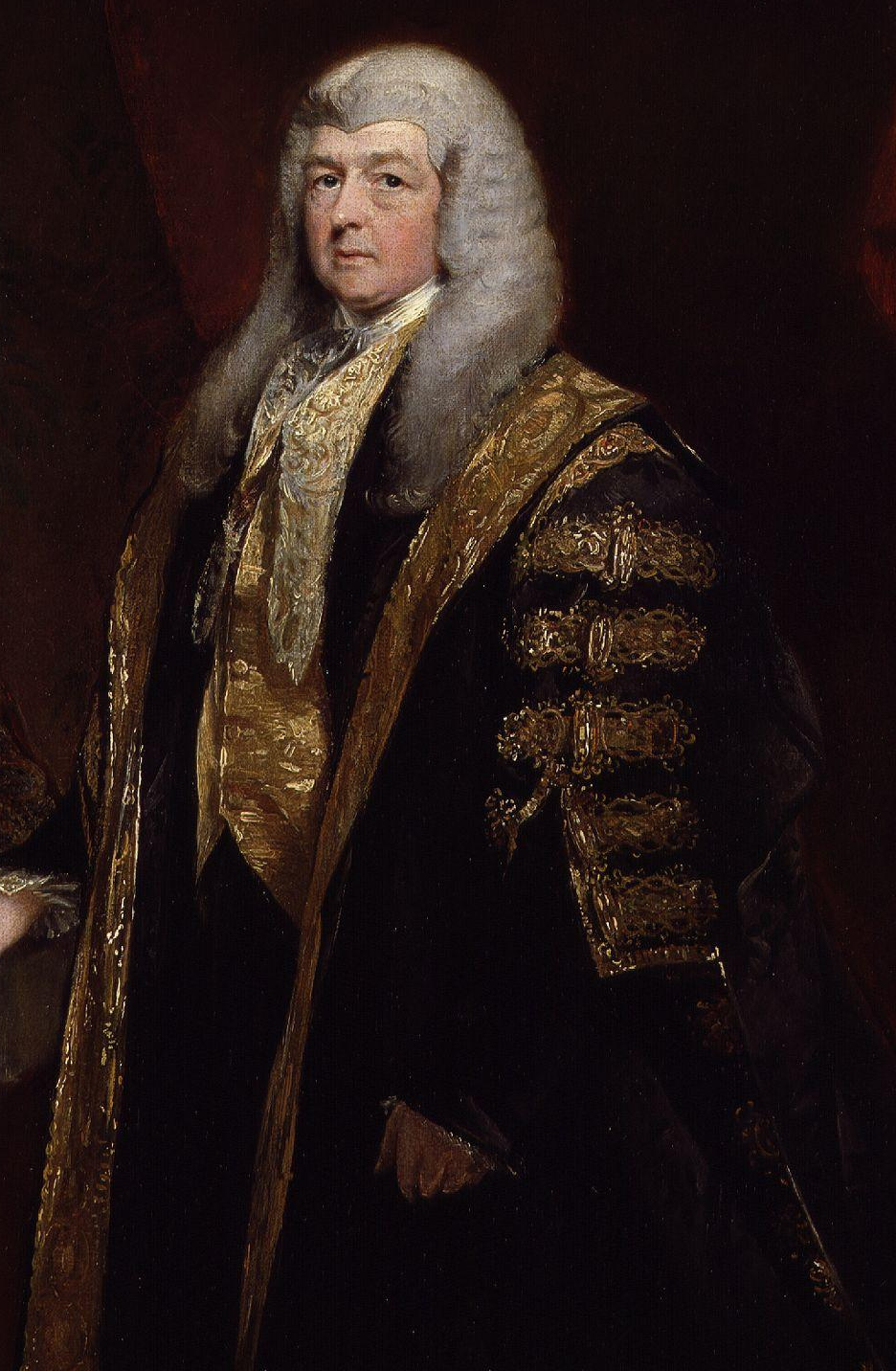
A portrait of the Lord Chancellor, Lord Cottenham (Charles Pepys, 1st Earl of Cottenham, 1781–1851), by Charles Robert Leslie. In Dimes v Grand Junction Canal (1852), his Lordship was disqualified from hearing a case as he had a pecuniary interest in the outcome.

Bias may be actual, imputed or apparent. Actual bias is established where it is actually established that a decision-maker was prejudiced in favour of or against a party. However, in practice, the making of such an allegation is rare as it is very hard to prove.

One form of imputed bias is based on the decision-maker being a party to a suit, or having a pecuniary or proprietary interest in the outcome of the decision. Once this fact has been established, the bias is irrebuttable and disqualification is automatic—the decision-maker will be barred from adjudicating the matter without the need for any investigation into the likelihood or suspicion of bias. A classic case is Dimes v Grand Junction Canal (1852), which involved an action between Dimes, a local landowner, and the proprietors of the Grand Junction Canal, in which the Lord Chancellor, Lord Cottenham, had affirmed decrees made to the proprietors. However, it was discovered by Dimes that Lord Cottenham, in fact, owned several pounds' worth of shares in the Grand Junction Canal. This eventually led to the judge being disqualified from deciding the case. There was no inquiry as to whether a reasonable person would consider Lord Cottenham to be biased, or as to the circumstances which led Lord Cottenham to hear the case.

In certain limited situations, bias can also be imputed when the decision-maker's interest in the decision is not pecuniary but personal. This was established in the unprecedented case of R v Bow Street Metropolitan Stipendiary Magistrate Ex parte Pinochet Ugarte (No.2) (1999). In an appeal to the House of Lords, the Crown Prosecution Service sought to overturn a quashing order made by the Divisional Court regarding extradition warrants made against the ex-Chilean dictator, Senator Augusto Pinochet. Amnesty International (AI) was given leave to intervene in the proceedings. However, one of the judges of the case, Lord Hoffmann, was a director and chairperson of Amnesty International Charity Ltd. (AICL), a company under the control of AI. He was eventually disqualified from the case and the outcome of the proceedings set aside.

The House of Lords held that the close connection between AICL and AI presented Lord Hoffmann with an interest in the outcome of the litigation. Even though it was non-pecuniary, the Law Lords took the view that the interest was sufficient to warrant Lord Hoffmann's automatic disqualification from hearing the case. In Locabail (UK) Ltd v Bayfield Properties Ltd (1999), the Court of Appeal warned against any further extension of the automatic disqualification rule, "unless plainly required to give effect to the important underlying principles upon which the rule is based".

==== Apparent bias ====
Apparent bias is present where a judge or other decision-maker is not a party to a matter and does not have an interest in its outcome, but through their conduct or behaviour gives rise to a suspicion that he or she is not impartial. An issue that has arisen is the degree of suspicion which would provide the grounds on which a decision should be set aside for apparent bias. Currently, cases from various jurisdictions apply two different tests: "real likelihood of bias" and "reasonable suspicion of bias".

The real likelihood test centres on whether the facts, as assessed by the court, give rise to a real likelihood of bias. In R v Gough (1993), the House of Lords chose to state the test in terms of a "real danger of bias", and emphasized that the test was concerned with the possibility, not probability, of bias. Lord Goff of Chievely also stated that "the court should look at the matter through the eyes of a reasonable man, because the court in cases such as these personifies the reasonable man". However, the test in Gough has been disapproved of in some Commonwealth jurisdictions. One criticism is that the emphasis on the court's view of the facts gives insufficient emphasis to the perception of the public. These criticisms were addressed by the House of Lords in Porter v Magill (2001). The Court adjusted the Gough test by stating it to be "whether the fair-minded and informed observer, having considered the facts, would conclude that there was a real possibility that the tribunal was biased". This case therefore established the current test in the UK to be one of a "real possibility of bias".

On the other hand, the reasonable suspicion test asks whether a reasonable and fair-minded person sitting in court and knowing all the relevant facts would have a reasonable suspicion that a fair trial for the litigant is not possible. Although not currently adopted in the UK, this test has been endorsed by the Singapore courts.

It has been suggested that the differences between the two tests are largely semantic and that the two tests operate similarly. In Locabail, the judges stated that in a large proportion of the cases, application of the two tests would lead to the same outcome. It was also held that "[p]rovided that the court, personifying the reasonable man, takes an approach which is based on broad common sense, and without inappropriate reliance on special knowledge, the minutiae of court procedure or other matters outside the ken of the ordinary, reasonably well-informed members of the public, there should be no risk that the courts will not ensure both that justice is done and that it is perceived by the public to be done".

In the Singapore High Court decision Tang Kin Hwa v. Traditional Chinese Medicine Practitioners Board (2005), Judicial Commissioner Andrew Phang observed that the real likelihood test is in reality similar to that of reasonable suspicion. First, likelihood is in fact "possibility", as opposed to the higher standard of proof centring on "probability". Secondly, he suggested that real in real likelihood cannot be taken to mean "actual", as this test relates to apparent and not actual bias. He also observed that both the court's and the public's perspectives are "integral parts of a holistic process" with no need to draw a sharp distinction between them.

In contrast, in Re Shankar Alan s/o Anant Kulkarni (2006), Judicial Commissioner Sundaresh Menon thought that there was a real difference between the reasonable suspicion and real likelihood tests. In his opinion, suspicion suggests a belief that something that may not be provable could still be possible. Reasonable suggests that the belief cannot be fanciful. Here the issue is whether it is reasonable for the one to harbour the suspicions in the circumstances even though the suspicious behaviour could be innocent. On the other hand, likelihood points towards something being likely, and real suggests that this must be substantial rather than imagined. Here, then, the inquiry is directed more towards the actor than the observer. The issue is the degree to which a particular event is not likely or possible Menon J.C. also disagreed with both Lord Goff in Gough and Phang J.C. in Tang Kin Hwa in that he thought the shift of the inquiry from how the matter might appear to a reasonable man to whether the judge thinks there is a sufficient possibility of bias was "a very significant point of departure".

The real likelihood test is met as long as the court is satisfied that there is a sufficient degree of possibility of bias. Although this a lower standard than satisfaction on a balance of probabilities, this is actually directed at mitigating the sheer difficulty of proving actual bias, especially given its insidious and often subconscious nature. The reasonable suspicion test, however, is met if the court is satisfied that a reasonable member of the public could harbour a reasonable suspicion of bias even though the court itself thought there was no real danger of this on the facts. The difference is that the driver behind this test is the strong public interest in ensuring public confidence in the administration of justice. As of September 2011, the Court of Appeal of Singapore had not yet expressed a view as to whether the position taken in Tang Kin Hwa or Shankar Alan is preferable.

=== Exceptions to the rule against bias ===
==== Necessity ====
There are cases in which a disqualified adjudicator cannot be replaced, as no one else is authorized to act. It has been observed that "disqualification of an adjudicator will not be permitted to destroy the only tribunal with power to act". In such cases, natural justice has to give way to necessity in order to maintain the integrity of judicial and administrative systems.

This issue regarding necessity was raised in Dimes. The Lord Chancellor had to sign an order for enrolment in order to allow the appeal to proceed from the Vice-Chancellor to the House of Lords. It was held that his shareholding in the canal company which barred him from sitting in the appeal did not affect his power to enroll, as no one but him had the authority to do so. It was mentioned this was allowed "for this [was] a case of necessity, and where that occurs the objection of interest cannot prevail".

==== Waiver ====
The court normally requests that an objection be taken as soon as the prejudiced party has knowledge of the bias. If an objection is not raised and proceedings are allowed to continue without disapproval, it will be held that the party has waived its right to do so.

=== Effect of a finding of bias ===
In Dimes, the judges advised the House of Lords that Lord Cottenham's pecuniary interest made his judgement not void, but voidable. This advice is not wrong in the context of a judicial act under review, where the judgement will be held valid unless reversed on appeal.

However, in the cases of administrative acts or decisions under judicial review, the court can only intervene on the grounds of ultra vires, hence making the judgement void. Lord Esher said in Allison v General Council of Medical Education and Registration (1894) that the participation of a disqualified person "certainly rendered the decision wholly void".

== Right to a fair hearing ==
=== In general ===
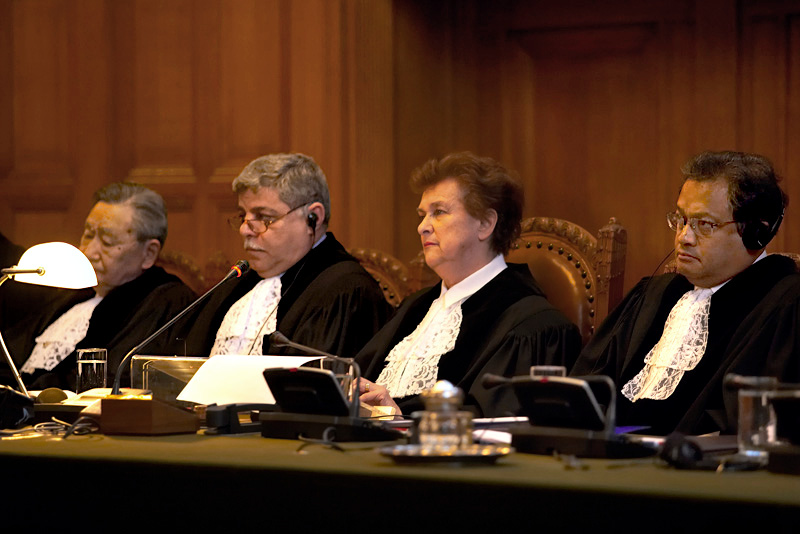
A hearing of the International Court of Justice in 2006 presided over by its president, Her Excellency Dame Rosalyn Higgins. A fundamental aspect of natural justice is that before a decision is made, all parties should be heard on the matter.

It has been suggested that the rule requiring a fair hearing is broad enough to include the rule against bias since a fair hearing must be an unbiased hearing. However, the rules are often treated separately. It is fundamental to fair procedure that both sides should be heard. The right to a fair hearing requires that individuals are not penalized by decisions affecting their rights or legitimate expectations unless they have been given prior notice of the cases against them, a fair opportunity to answer them, and the opportunity to present their own cases.

Besides promoting an individual's liberties, the right to a fair hearing has also been used by courts as a base on which to build up fair administrative procedures. It is now well established that it is not the character of the public authority that matters but the character of the power exercised. However, in the United Kingdom prior to Ridge v Baldwin (1963), the scope of the right to a fair hearing was severely restricted by case law following Cooper v Wandsworth Board of Works (1863). In R v Electricity Commissioners, ex parte London Electricity Joint Committee Co. (1920), Ltd. (1923), Lord Atkin observed that the right only applied where decision-makers had "the duty to act judicially". In natural justice cases this dictum was generally understood to mean that a duty to act judicially was not to be inferred merely from the impact of a decision on the rights of subjects; such a duty would arise only if there was a "superadded" express obligation to follow a judicial-type procedure in arriving at the decision.

In Ridge v Baldwin, Lord Reid reviewed the authorities extensively and attacked the problem at its root by demonstrating how the term judicial had been misinterpreted as requiring some additional characteristic over and above the characteristic that the power affected some person's rights. In his view, the mere fact that the power affects rights or interests is what makes it "judicial" and so subject to the procedures required by natural justice. This removal of the earlier misconception as to the meaning of judicial is thought to have given the judiciary the flexibility it needed to intervene in cases of judicial review.

The mere fact that a decision-maker is conferred wide discretion by law is not reason enough for a weakening of the requirements of natural justice. In the United Kingdom context, this is demonstrated by Ahmed v H.M. Treasury (No. 1) (2010). The Treasury had exercised powers to freeze the appellants' financial assets and economic resources on the ground that it reasonably suspected the appellants were or might be persons who had committed, attempted to commit, participated in or facilitated the commission of terrorism, pursuant to the Terrorism (United Nations Measures) Order 2006 and the Al-Qaida and Taliban (United Nations Measures) Order 2006 made under the United Nations Act 1946. The Supreme Court of the United Kingdom held that since the Al-Qaida Order made no provision for basic procedural fairness, it effectively deprived people designated under the order the fundamental right of access to a judicial remedy and hence was ultra vires the power conferred by the United Nations Act 1946 for the making of the Order.

=== Article 6 of the European Convention ===
The right to a fair hearing is also referred to in Article 6(1) of the European Convention on Human Rights and Fundamental Freedoms, which states:

In the determination of his civil rights and obligations or of any criminal charge against him, everyone is entitled to a fair and public hearing within a reasonable time by an independent and impartial tribunal established by law. ...

Article 6 does not, however, replace the common law duty to ensure a fair hearing. It has been suggested that Article 6 alone is not enough to protect procedural due process, and only with the development of a more sophisticated common law will the protection of procedural due process extend further into the administrative machine. Nonetheless, Article 6 supplements the common law. For example, the common law does not impose a general duty to give reasons for a decision, but under Article 6(1) a decision-maker must give a reasoned judgement so as to enable an affected individual to decide whether to appeal.

=== Aspects of a fair hearing ===
==== Prior notice of hearing ====
Natural justice allows a person to claim the right to adequate notification of the date, time, place of the hearing as well as detailed notification of the case to be met. This information allows the person adequate time to effectively prepare their own case and to answer the case against him or her. In Cooper v Wandsworth, Chief Justice William Erle went so far as to state that the lack of notice and hearing afforded to Cooper could be said to be a form of abuse, as he had been treated as if he did not matter. As Lord Mustill famously held in R v Secretary of State for the Home Department Ex p Doody (1993): "Since the person affected usually cannot make worthwhile representations without knowing what factors may weigh against his interests fairness will very often require that he is informed of the gist of the case which he has to answer."

It has been suggested that the requirement of prior notice serves three important purposes:

- The interest in good outcomes – giving prior notice increases the value of the proceedings as it is only when the interested person knows the issues and the relevant information that he or she can make a useful contribution.
- The duty of respect – the affected person has the right to know what is at stake, and it is not enough to simply inform him or her that there will be a hearing.
- The rule of law – notice of issues and disclosure of information opens up the operations of the public authority to public scrutiny.

The British courts have held it is not enough for an affected person to merely be informed of a hearing. He or she must also be told what is at stake; in other words, the gist of the case.

==== Opportunity to be heard ====
Every person has the right to have a hearing and be allowed to present their own case. Should a person not attend the hearing, even with adequate notice given, the adjudicator has the discretion to decide if the hearing should proceed. In Ridge v Baldwin, a chief constable succeeded in having his dismissal from service declared void as he had not been given the opportunity to make a defence. In another case, Chief Constable of the North Wales Police v Evans (1982), a chief constable required a police probationer to resign on account of allegations about his private life which he was given no fair opportunity to rebut. The House of Lords found the dismissal to be unlawful. Likewise in Surinder Singh Kanda v Federation of Malaya (1962), a public servant facing disciplinary proceedings was not supplied with a copy of a prejudicial report by a board of inquiry which the adjudicating officer had access to before the hearing. The Privy Council held that the proceedings had failed to provide him a reasonable opportunity of being heard.

However, this requirement does not necessarily mean the decision-maker has to meet the complainant face to face—"Natural justice does not generally demand orality". It has been suggested that an oral hearing will almost be as good as useless if the affected person has no prior knowledge of the case. In Lloyd v McMahon (1987), an oral hearing did not make a difference to the facts on which the case was based. Giving judgement in the Court of Appeal of England and Wales, Lord Justice Harry Woolf held that an oral hearing may not always be the "very pith of the administration of natural justice". It has also been suggested that an oral hearing is only required if issues concerning deprivations of legal rights or legally protected interests arise.

==== Conduct of the hearing ====
When deciding how the hearing should be conducted, the adjudicator has to ask whether the person charged has a proper opportunity to consider, challenge or contradict any evidence, and whether the person is also fully aware of the nature of the allegations against him or her so as to have a proper opportunity to present their own case. In Secretary of State for the Home Department v AF (2009), Lord Phillips of Worth Matravers said:

The best way of producing a fair trial is to ensure that a party to it has the fullest information of both the allegations that are made against him and the evidence relied upon in support of those allegations. Where the evidence is documentary, he should have access to the documents. Where the evidence consists of oral testimony, then he should be entitled to cross-examine the witnesses who give that testimony, whose identities should be disclosed.

However, when a hearing requires the balancing of multiple polycentric issues such as natural justice and the protection of confidential information for national security reasons, both the concerns of public security and the right to a fair trial must be adequately met. It was held by the House of Lords in AF, applying the decision of the Grand Chamber of the European Court of Human Rights A v United Kingdom (2009), that a person accused of terrorism against whom a control order has been issued must be given sufficient information about the allegations against him to enable him to give effective instructions to his special advocate. If this requirement is satisfied, a fair hearing can be conducted without detailed disclosure of confidential information that might compromise national security. On the facts of the case, a special advocate was not permitted further contact with an applicant or his ordinary legal representatives except with permission of the Special Immigration Appeals Commission (SIAC) after viewing confidential (or "closed") materials.

The House of Lords recognized that although a special advocate's usefulness is stymied somewhat from having no further instructions after viewing such materials, if the SIAC decides to issue a control order predominantly on the basis of non-confidential (or "open") materials, an applicant cannot be regarded as having been denied an opportunity to challenge the reasonableness of the government's beliefs and suspicions about him. If the evidence against the applicant is largely closed but allegations contained in open material are sufficiently specific, an applicant should be able to provide his legal representatives and special advocate with information to refute it (such as an alibi, if the open material alleges he was at a certain place during a certain period) without having to know the detail or sources of the closed evidence. However, if the evidence revealed to the person consists only of general assertions and the case against him is based solely or to a substantive extent on undisclosed adverse evidence, the fair hearing rule under natural justice will not be satisfied.

In such cases, there are strong policy considerations supporting the principle that a trial procedure can never be considered fair if a person is kept in ignorance of the case against him or her. First, since the grounds for a reasonable suspicion that a person is involved in terrorist activity can span from incontrovertible evidence to an innocent misinterpretation of facts which can be explained away by the person, in many cases it is impossible for courts to be sure that the disclosure of the evidence will make no difference to the applicant. Secondly, resentment will be felt by the person and his family and friends if sanctions are imposed without any proper explanation of the grounds and when, due to the non-disclosure of information, the person is put in a position where he is unable to properly defend himself. As Lord Phillips put it, "if the wider public are to have confidence in the justice system, they need to be able to see that justice is done rather than being asked to take it on trust".

The right to be heard in answer to charges before an unbiased tribunal is illustrated in the Singapore case Tan Boon Chee David v. Medical Council of Singapore (1980). During a disciplinary hearing, council members were either not conscientious about their attendance or did not attend the whole course of proceedings. This meant they did not hear all the oral evidence and submissions. The High Court held that this had substantially prejudiced the appellant and constituted a fundamental breach of natural justice. On the other hand, mere absence from a hearing does not necessarily lead to undue prejudice. It was held in Re Teo Choo Hong (1995) that the function of a lay member of a lawyers' disciplinary committee was to observe and not cast a vote or make a judgement. Thus, the appellant had not suffered undue prejudice.

On the basis of reciprocity, if one side is allowed to cross-examine his legal opponent at a hearing, the other party must also be given the same opportunity. In addition, when a tribunal decides a case on a basis not raised or contemplated by the parties, or decides it without regarding the submissions and arguments made by the parties on the issues, this will amount to a breach of natural justice. However, a genuine bona fide mistake by an adjudicator in omitting to state reasons for not considering a submission is not enough to be a breach of natural justice. This may occur when the submissions were accidentally omitted, or were so unconvincing that it was not necessary to explicitly state the adjudicator's findings.

==== Right to legal representation ====
There is no inherent common law right to legal representation before a domestic tribunal. A tribunal has the discretion to admit either a legally qualified or unqualified counsel to assist the person appearing before it, based on the facts of the case. When assessing whether a party should be offered legal assistance, the adjudicator should first ask whether the right to be heard applies, and, secondly, whether counsel's assistance is needed for an effective hearing given the subject matter, bearing in mind the consequences of such a denial.

In R v Secretary of State for Home Department, ex parte Tarrant (1983), Webster J. set out six factors to be considered when deciding whether to allow representation by counsel, namely:

- the seriousness of the charge and the potential penalty;
- whether any points of law are likely to arise.;
- whether the prisoner is capable of presenting his own case;
- whether there are any procedural difficulties faced by prisoners in conducting their own defence;
- whether there is reasonable speed in making the adjudication; and
- whether there is a need for fairness between prisoners or between prisoners and prison officers.

It has also been suggested that where a tribunal hearing concerns the individual's reputation or right to livelihood, there is a greater need for allowing legal representation as this vindicates the idea of equality before the law.

When one refuses legal representation, one cannot expect to receive a higher "standard" of natural justice. This was enunciated in Singapore in Ho Paul v. Singapore Medical Council (2008). Dr. Ho, who had been charged with professional misconduct, chose to appear before the council in person and declined to cross-examine the council's key witness. Subsequently, he argued that he should have been warned of the legal implications of not being legally represented. The High Court rejected this argument and held he had suffered no prejudice. Dr. Ho had been given a fair opportunity of presenting his own case and, most importantly, had not been deprived of his right to cross-examine the witnesses.

It is also not a court's obligation to provide assistance when a party presents their case without legal representation. In Rajeevan Edakalavan v. Public Prosecutor (1998), the accused had appeared in person before a magistrate and had entered a plea of guilt. He later petitioned the High Court for criminal revision, arguing that as the magistrate had not informed him of the defences available to him, his plea had been equivocal. The Court held:

The onus [of informing the accused of his defence options or what could be more advantageous to his case] does not shift to the judge (or the Prosecution, for that matter) simply because the accused is unrepresented. That will be placing too onerous a burden on the judge. Furthermore, the judge will be performing two completely incompatible and irreconcilable roles—one as the adjudicator, the other as the de facto defence counsel.

In Singapore, the right to legal representation is contingent on the nature of the inquiry. However, since Article 12 of the Constitution of Singapore guarantees equal protection under the law, it has been suggested that greater weightage should be accorded to this procedural right when balancing it against the competing demand of efficiency.

==== The decision and reasons for it ====
Currently, the principles of natural justice in the United Kingdom and certain other jurisdictions do not include a general rule that reasons should be given for decisions. In R v Northumberland Compensation Appeal Tribunal, ex parte Shaw (1951), Denning L.J. stated: "I think the record must contain at least the document which initiates the proceedings; the pleadings, if any; and the adjudication; but not the evidence, nor the reasons, unless the tribunal chooses to incorporate them. If the tribunal does state its reasons, and those reasons are wrong in law, certiorari lies to quash the decision." It has been stated that "no single factor has inhibited the development of English administrative law as seriously as the absence of any general obligation upon public authorities to give reasons for their decisions".

Historically, uncontrolled public decisions have led to poor outcomes and disrespect for the decision-makers. Such decisions also lacked the regularity and transparency that distinguish them from the mere say-so of public authorities. On such grounds, there are obvious benefits for the disclosure of reasons for decisions. First, procedural participation by people affected by a decision promotes the rule of law by making it more difficult for the public authority to act arbitrarily.

Requiring the giving of reasons helps ensure that decisions are carefully thought through, which in turn aids in the control of administrative discretion. Secondly, accountability makes it necessary for the public authority to face up to the people affected by a decision. When a public authority acts on all the relevant considerations, this increases the probability of better decision outcomes and, as such, is beneficial to public interests. Another important benefit is that respect for decision-makers is fostered, which increases their integrity in the public's eyes.

== See also ==
- Doctrine of bias in Singapore law
- Faceless court
- Fundamental justice
- Judicial review in English law
