= Assas =

Assas may refer to

- Assas, Hérault, commune in France
- Paris-Panthéon-Assas University, commonly called "Panthéon-Assas" or "Assas"
  - Assas Law School, the law school of the Paris-Panthéon-Assas University
- Assa (disambiguation) various senses, some of which may be pluralised by adding -s

== See also ==
- Nicolas-Louis d'Assas (1733–1760), Chevalier d'Assas, a captain of the French Régiment d'Auvergne; after whom is named
- Rue d'Assas, street Paris, France
- Otmane El Assas (born 1979) Moroccan footballer
