= Loh Kooi Choon v Malaysia =

Loh Kooi Choon v Government of Malaysia (1977) 2 MLJ 187 is a case decided in the Federal Court of Malaysia concerning the rights and freedoms guaranteed by the Constitution, and also involving the extent to which Parliament can amend the Constitution. The decision was delivered by Federal Justice Raja Azlan Shah.

== Background ==
Loh had been detained by the Royal Malaysian Police under a warrant issued under the provisions of the Restricted Residence Enactment 1933 (RRE). Article 5(4) of the Constitution specified that any person arrested "be produced before a magistrate and shall not be further detained in custody without the magistrate's authority" — guaranteeing the right of habeas corpus. Loh was denied this right, and sued the Police for damages. However, his claim was rejected on the grounds that the police had acted in compliance with a warrant issued by a competent authority. Loh appealed to the Federal Court, which heard his appeal four years after the original case.

Before his appeal was heard, however, Parliament amended Article 5(4), adding a provision stating:

Provided that this Clause shall not apply to the arrest or detention of any person under the existing law relating to restricted residence, and all the provisions of this Clause shall be deemed to have been an integral part of this Article as from Merdeka Day (independence day).

== Case ==
Before the Federal Court, Loh's counsel argued against the amendment and its retrospective effect on the grounds that it was not permissible for the Constitution to be amended in such a way that its "basic structure" was destroyed. Loh referred to Article 4(1), which specifies that the Constitution is "the supreme law of the Federation", and to the Basic Structure doctrine of Indian case law, to argue that the amendment had contravened the spirit and basic structure of the Constitution by invalidating the right of habeas corpus.

== Decision ==
Federal Justice Raja Azlan Shah rejected the argument of the appellant, stating that although Article 4(1) declared that any unconstitutional law passed after independence would be void, this did not apply to the Constitution itself — the Constitution could not be internally inconsistent. In his judgement, he stated that law made under ordinary legislative power, and law in the form of Constitutional amendments, were two different things, and as such constitutional amendments were not subject to the inconsistency clause of Article 4(1):

This reasoning, in my view, is based on the premise that the Constitution as the supreme law, unchangeable by ordinary means, is distinct from ordinary law and as such cannot be inconsistent with itself.

== Criticism ==
The case has been criticised by legal scholars, who have argued that it effectively gave the government free rein to pass unconstitutional laws. One part of Raja Azlan Shah's judgement, which stated that "the individual has certain fundamental rights upon which not even the power of the State may encroach" was subjected to criticism for "hardly (holding) substance" in light of certain legislation, such as the RRE and the Internal Security Act (ISA), that allegedly encroach on human rights. This part of the judgement in Loh has been described as "no more than judicial rhetoric".

Legal scholars have suggested that the decision in Loh made Article 4(1) insufficient with regard to ensuring the constitutionality of laws passed by Parliament, as:

Instead of bringing the impugned legislation, i.e. the RRE, into accord with the constitution it was the Constitution that was brought into accord with the impugned legislation. It is inevitable to conclude that after the decision in Loh Kooi Choon the RRE was accorded a supreme position over the Constitution in regard to arbitrary arrest and restriction of movement just because the authorities forgot to apply Article 5(4) in the course of arresting and detaining a subject.

== Legacy ==
The decision concerning the "basic structure" of the Constitution in Loh was reaffirmed in the 1980 case of Phang Chin Hock v. Public Prosecutor. In Phang, the case was heard by Lord President Tun Mohd Suffian Hashim, Justice Wan Sulaiman, and Justice Syed Othman, who unanimously agreed, in the words of Lord President Suffian:

For the purpose of this appeal it is enough for us merely to say that Parliament may amend the Constitution in any way they think fit, provided they comply with all the conditions precedent and subsequent regarding manner and form prescribed by the Constitution itself.

== See also ==
- Basic structure doctrine of the case law in India
- Assa Singh v. Menteri Besar of Johore
- Teo Soh Lung v. Minister for Home Affairsin Singapore: considered and rejected by the High Court
- Anwar Hossain Chowdhary v. Bangladesh noted as precedent by the Supreme Court of Bangladesh
