= ASSA =

ASSA can refer to:

== Societies and associations ==
- Academy of the Social Sciences in Australia, an independent NGO dedicated to the advancement of knowledge and research in the social science
- Allied Social Science Associations, a collective of academic and professional social science organizations in the United States
- Astronomical Society of South Australia
- Astronomical Society of Southern Africa

== Other uses ==
- Armed Services Security Agency, UK
- Assa Abloy, a Swedish manufacturer of locks and security doors

== See also ==
- Assa (disambiguation)
