= Wollumbin pouched frog =

Conservation status
- Critically endangered (EPBC Act)

Scientific classification
- Kingdom: Animalia
- Phylum: Chordata
- Class: Amphibia
- Order: Anura
- Family: Myobatrachidae
- Genus: Assa
- Species: A. wollumbin

Binomial name
- Assa wollumbin Mahony, Hines, Mahony, Moses, Catalano, Myers, and Donnellan, 2021

Species of frog

Assa wollumbin, the Wollumbin pouched frog or Mount Wollumbin hip-pocket frog, is a species of small, terrestrial frog endemic to New South Wales, Australia. It is restricted to the slopes of Mount Warning (Wollumbin), where it inhabits rainforest habitat.

Previously considered a population of the pouched frog (A. darlingtoni), which was thought to be the only species in the genus, it was described as a new species in 2021 following a rangewide genetic analysis of A. darlingtoni, which found the Wollumbin population to be sufficiently genetically distinct; it is also physically smaller than A. darlingtoni. Despite its distinctiveness, it is separated from populations of A. darlingtoni by only 15 kilometres (9.3 mi); in relation to the ancient Tweed Volcano, A. darlingtoni inhabits the former caldera wall while A. wollumbin inhabits the former volcanic plug that is now Mt. Wollumbin. As with A. darlingtoni, it shares the unusual parental care where male individuals carry developing tadpoles in subcutaneous pouches on their hips.

As of September 2023, it was classified as "Critically Endangered" under the EPBC Act.
