= Savannah Memorial Park =

California Historic Landmark No. 1046

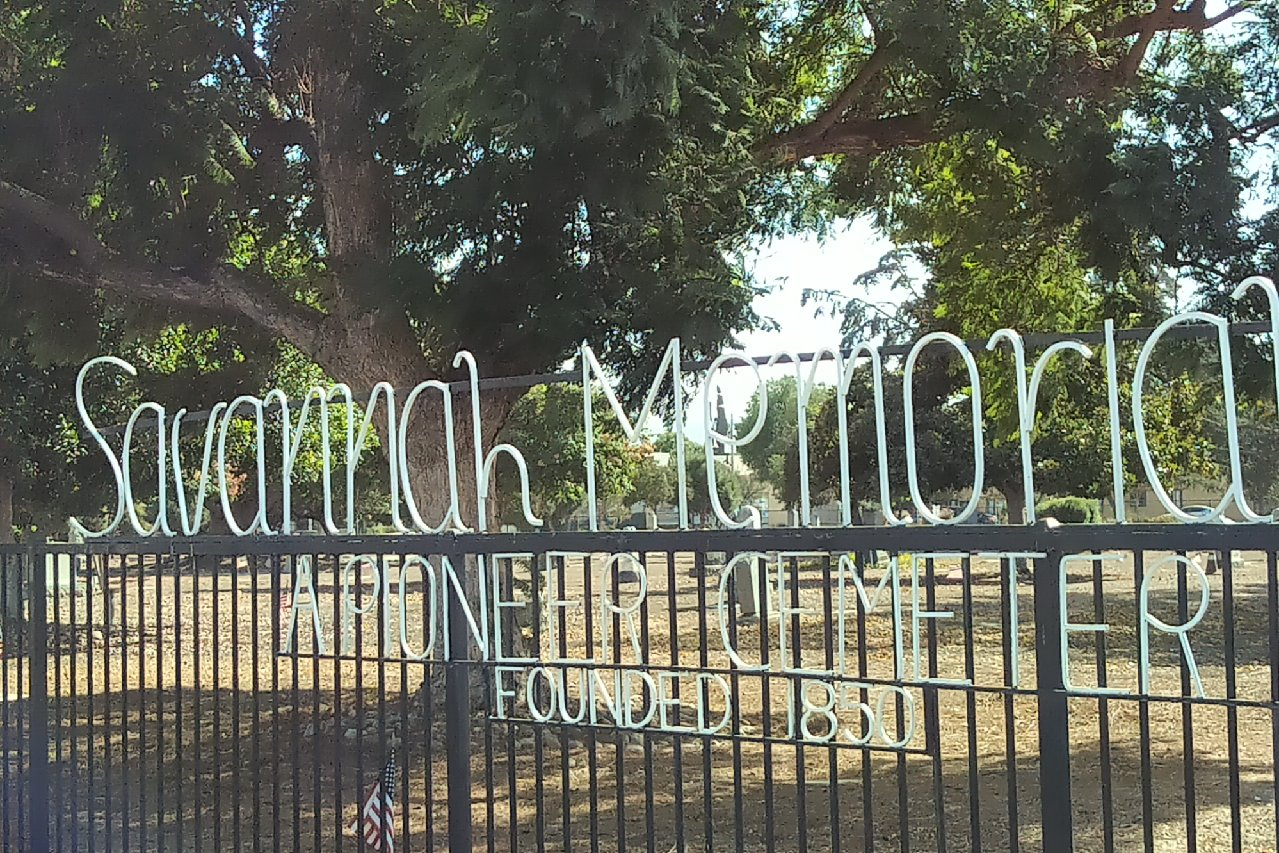
- Savannah Memorial Park

- Location within the Los Angeles metropolitan area
- 34°4′52″N 118°4′4″W
- Location: 9263 Valley Blvd, Rosemead, California, US 91770

History
- Built: 1850

Site notes
- Area: 4.5 acres (1.8 ha)

California Historical Landmark
- Designated: March 6, 2012.
- Reference no.: 1046

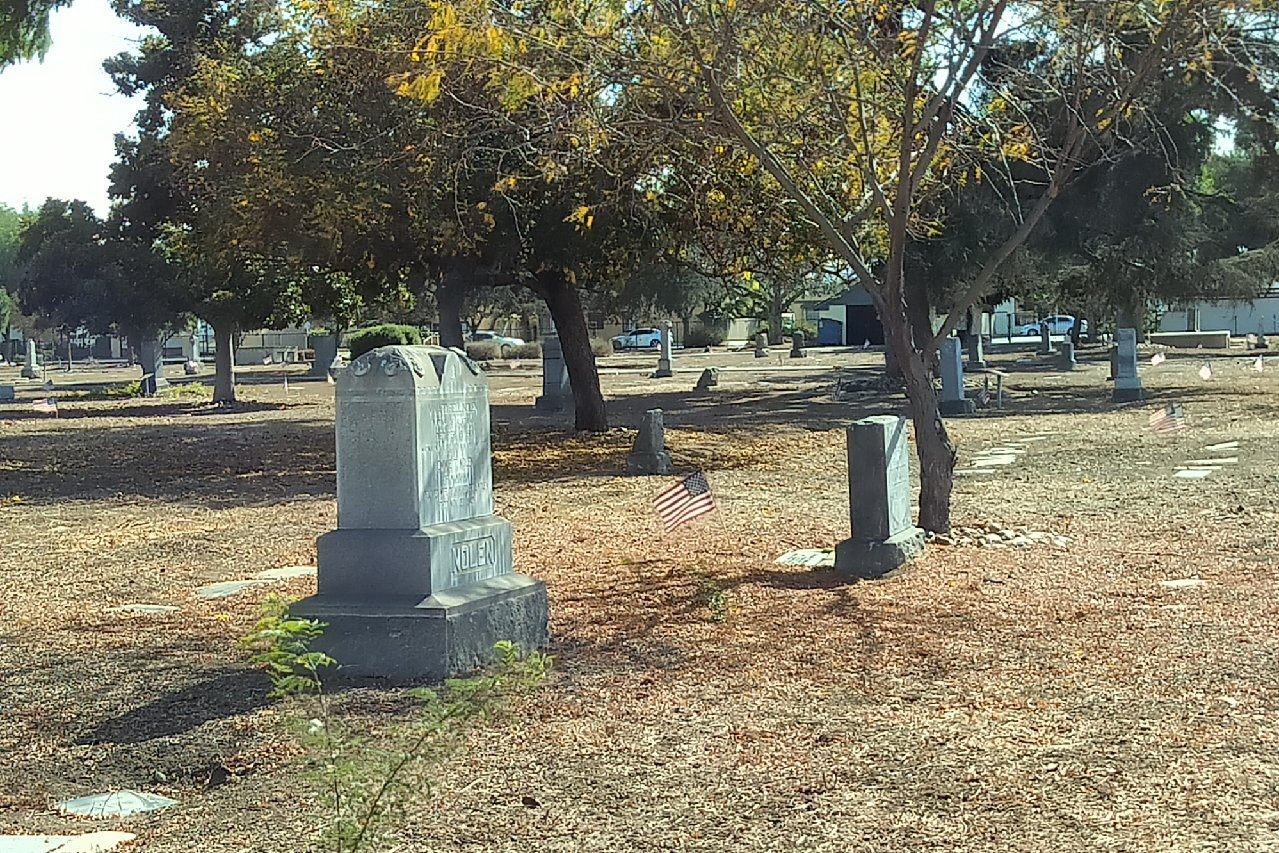
Savannah Memorial Park

Savannah Memorial Park Cemetery also known as El Monte Memorial Park and the Savannah Pioneer Cemetery is the oldest American non-sectarian cemetery in Southern California. The park is located in Rosemead, California, and part of the park is in the neighboring city of El Monte. The park has been in continuous operation since its founding in 1850. Some of the burials may date back into the 1840s before Savannah Memorial Park became a Memorial Park. Savannah Memorial Park was designated a California Historical Landmark (No. 1046) on March 6, 2012.

== History ==
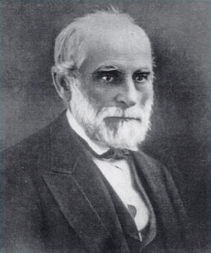
Henry Dalton, founder of Savannah Memorial Park

About 1846 Henry Dalton (1803–1884) owner of Rancho San Francisquito, found two graves on his property that were protected by a cactus hedge. He set aside two acres surrounding the graves for a cemetery. Dalton was a merchant and had purchased a number of properties in Los Angeles and San Gabriel Valley during the late 1800s. He and his wife Maria née Zamorano (1832–1914) purchased food products around the world and brought them to the San Gabriel Valley at his Rancho Azusa de Dalton homestead. Henry Dalton was also called Don Enrique Dalton was the first recorded as bringing avocados to be planted in the San Gabriel Valley. He also imported 9,000 wine and brandy grape vines from Europe. He also imported honey bees from Italy. Henry Dalton donated the land to the city for the graveyard in 1851. Henry Dalton at one time was the owner of five ranches: Azusa, San Francisquito, Rancho San Jose, Rancho Addition and Rancho Santa Anita. Henry Dalton is interred in Calvary Cemetery, Los Angeles.

Before the Civil War, many Southern families moved to and settled in El Monte, at the time called Lexington, and the adjacent community, Rosemead, called Savannah in the past. It is reputed to be the oldest Protestant cemetery in Los Angeles County. The El Monte Cemetery Association, incorporated in 1920, is responsible for the maintenance and upkeep of the cemetery. The association's funding comes from private donations and fundraising activities.

The park is currently managed by the El Monte Cemetery Association. The Association has over 3,700 documented graves on the four-acre cemetery. El Monte Cemetery Association is 501(c) non-profit organization. In the past was run by the Savannah Cemetery Association. El Monte is near the end of the Santa Fe Trail and the Southern Emigrant Trail, thus near the end is the oldest non-sectarian cemetery in Southern California, Savannah Memorial Park Cemetery. The park is also on the route used during the 1800s to transport wood and other supplies to the Mission San Gabriel Arcángel.

American Legion Post #261 and American Legion Reyner Aguirre Post #748 host Memorial Day Ceremony each year in May.

== Markers ==
- The California Historical Landmark on the spot reads:

Established in 1851, on the spot where Henry Dalton’s land grant showed "the American graveyard”, Savannah was the first public burial site used by settlers who came to the San Gabriel Valley by wagon train. Many of these pioneers were instrumental in developing the educational, social, and legal foundations of Southern California. Their family names are commemorated in the names of streets, buildings, and parks throughout the area. These pioneers formed the foundation of the American presence in El Monte, Rosemead, and the surrounding San Gabriel Valley.

- There is a dedicatory Rock and Plaque in the Park, dedicated to the memory of California Pioneers. It was erected by the El Monte Cemetery Association on May 30, 1922.
- On July 2, 1929, there was a ceremony for the placement of a seven-inch trench siege mortar next to the Park's flag pole., Siege mortar cannon was obtained from Benicia Arsenal by the United Veterans of the Republic, in El Monte. The siege mortar is for the Memorial and tribute to the war veterans buried Savannah Memorial Park. The dedication ceremony leaders were Charles A. King, of the Veterans of the Republic, and a chamber of commerce committee of Roy C. Addelman and Neil R. Murray.

== Notable interments ==
- Veterans from all US wars beginning with the War of 1812
- Wiley R. Wilson, (1800–1878) a veteran of the War of 1812, Brother of Benjamin Davis Wilson
- Andrew Jackson King (1833–1923) a lawman, lawyer, legislator and judge
- Asa Ellis (1817–1890) – Member of California state assembly 2nd District 1867–69, 1871–73, 1877–80
- Charles E. Wiggins (1927–2000) Cenotaph monument for this US Representative and United States Circuit Judge.
- Hazen Aldrich (1797–1873) leader in the branch off of Latter Day Saint movement.
- (?–1853) first pioneer settler of El Monte
- Taylor Scott White (1849–1918) pioneer settler of El Monte, foreman of the Shorb Ranch and road supervisor for Los Angeles County.
- Fredrick Payson Cave (?–1907) pioneer settler of El Monte, invented an acetylene gas light and trustee on the El Monte School Board
- James Devine Durfee (1840–1920) Large El Monte land owner, MD Doctor, trustee of La Puente schools and State Republican Leader
- Victoria Freer (?–1942) Leader in the Savannah Cemetery Association and Degree of Honor Protective Association Leader
- Thomas H. Lambert (1870–1873) First National Bank of El Monte, and president of the Los Angeles County Farm Bureau.
- John T. Haddox (1858–1873) postmaster of El Monte, Republican Party leader.
- James R. Durfee (1874–) trustee of the Temple School, and vice-president and director of the First National Bank of El Monte.
- Robert Tweedy Sr (1811–1899) Pioneer Settler came from Arkansas in 1852. part of the Captain Johnson wagon train on the Santa Fe Trail. Acquired part of the Rancho San Antonio this became city of South Gate. Tweedy Blvd. was named for him.
- Samuel Sawyer Thompson (1798–? ) pioneer resident of El Monte. Los Angeles County Supervisor in 1854 and an El Monte justice of the peace in 1861
- Margaret McKamy Thompson pioneer resident of El Monte
- Mrs. Thomas H. Lambert, (?–1929) pioneer resident of El Monte, husband Thomas H. Lambert
- Mrs. Serene Frances Livingood (1845–1946) 100 year old pioneer resident of El Monte.
- Archie N. Wiggins (1863–1927) Known as the Watermelon King of El Monte. One of only a few American children who attended the Old Mission school. Was active in development of educational facilities in El Monte.
- Thomas Mayes Wiggins (1873–1937) Jockey in the New Year day steeplechase held after annual Tournament of Roses Rose Parade. Also the drive of chariot races at the event.
- Benjamin F. Maxson (1841–1899) Civil War veteran and prominent walnut grower in Southern California.
- "David D. Mings" Ascot automobile racer at the Ascot race track, promoter of rodeos at Los Angeles Memorial Coliseum and WW1 Vet.
- Dr. Elgar Reed (1866–1924) Physician, SGV smallpox epidemic doctor.
- George B. Renfro (1844–1938)Civil War Veteran, licensed weighmaster for Los Angeles County
- P. W. Shropshire (1876–1959) One of the last veterans of the Spanish–American War. Member of American Legion Post 261.
- William Slack (1823–1915) pioneer resident of El Monte.
- Nicholas Smith (Schmidt) (?–1904) Early pioneer resident of El Monte. Forty-niner pioneer.
- Grant Price Cuddeback (1820–1905) Early pioneer resident of El Monte. Forty-nine pioneer.
- Almira Hale Cuddeback Early pioneer resident of El Monte. Forty-niner pioneer.

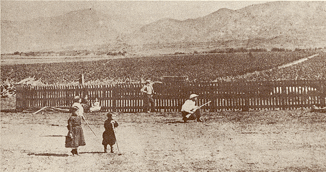
Rancho Azusa de Dalton 1860s, with Henry Dalton, Winall Dalton, Anna Ellen Dalton, Soyla Dalton and Valentine Dalton.

== See also ==
- List of California Ranchos
- Ranchos of Los Angeles County, California
- Santa Fe Trail Historical Park
- California Historical Landmarks in Los Angeles County
