= Assa Singh v Menteri Besar of Johore =

Assa Singh v. Menteri Besar of Johore (1969) 2 MLJ 30 was a case heard in the Federal Court of Malaysia concerning the applicability of the Restricted Residence Enactment 1933 (RRE) after Malaysian independence in 1957. The Federal Court held that although the application of the RRE had resulted in the violation of Singh's rights under Articles 5 and 9 of the Constitution, these violations were Constitutional because Article 162 permitted the grandfathering of pre-independence laws.

== Background ==
Assa Singh was arrested under the provisions of the RRE by the Police with a view to forcibly relocating him to another district to preserve security and public order. Singh filed a suit claiming that this was a violation of his rights under Articles 5 (personal liberty) and 9 (freedom of movement) of the Constitution. The trial judge then referred Singh's case to the Federal Court to determine the constitutionality of the RRE.

== Decision ==
The case was heard in the Federal Court by Lord President of the Federal Court Azmi Mohamed, Chief Justice Ong Hock Thye, Federal Justice Mohamed Suffian Mohamed Hashim, Federal Justice P. S. Gill, and Justice Raja Azlan Shah. The judges unanimously held that, although the RRE did violate Singh's rights, this did not void it as an unconstitutional law. Instead, they held that the RRE could still be applied by "reading these rights into the Enactment".

The Solicitor General had submitted that under the Constitution, only acts of law inconsistent with the Constitution that were passed after independence would be void, while Article 162 excepted legislation passed prior to independence. (Clause 6 of Article 162 permits a court to apply the pre-independence legislation by modifying it as required to conform with the Constitution.) This submission was accepted by Suffian, who wrote:

To sum up, in my judgment, the Restricted Residence Enactment is silent as regards the four rights guaranteed by article 5 to a person arrested under the Enactment, namely, the right to be informed as soon as may be of the grounds of his arrest, to be allowed to consult and be defended by a legal practitioner of his choice, and, if not sooner released, to be produced without unreasonable delay and in any case within 24 hours (excluding the time of any necessary journey), before a magistrate and not to be further detained without the magistrate’s order. Such further detention must be in accordance with law, which law need not give him a right to an enquiry. Silence of the Enactment regarding the four rights does not make it contrary to the constitution. Even if the Enactment is contrary to the Constitution, the Enactment is not void. The four rights should be read into the Enactment.

As a result, it was held that the RRE's breach of Singh's rights was constitutional, and Singh was not released.

== Criticism ==
The decision in Assa Singh has been unfavourably compared with Surinder Singh Kanda v. The Government of the Federation of Malaya, a previous case dealing with the constitutionality of a law passed before independence. The final decision in Kanda was handed down by the Judicial Committee of the Privy Council, where Lord Denning held that if pre-independence legislation was inconsistent with the Constitution, the provisions of the Constitution would supersede those of the legislation in question.

One legal scholar has said:

What was involved in Assa Singh was the question of the liberty of the subject. It was not an ordinary matter such as the power of appointment or the power of dismissal which was the issue in Kanda. The Federal Court should have made a clear distinction between a freedom right and an ordinary right just as the writ of habeas corpus has been rightly regarded as a high prerogative writ compared to an ordinary writ... It is clear that the one salient distinction which the court in Assa Singh failed to appreciate and distinguish was the fact that persons detained or restricted under the RRE are faced with the violation of their freedom for which the court should pay particular attention.

== See also ==
- Loh Kooi Choon v. Government of Malaysia
