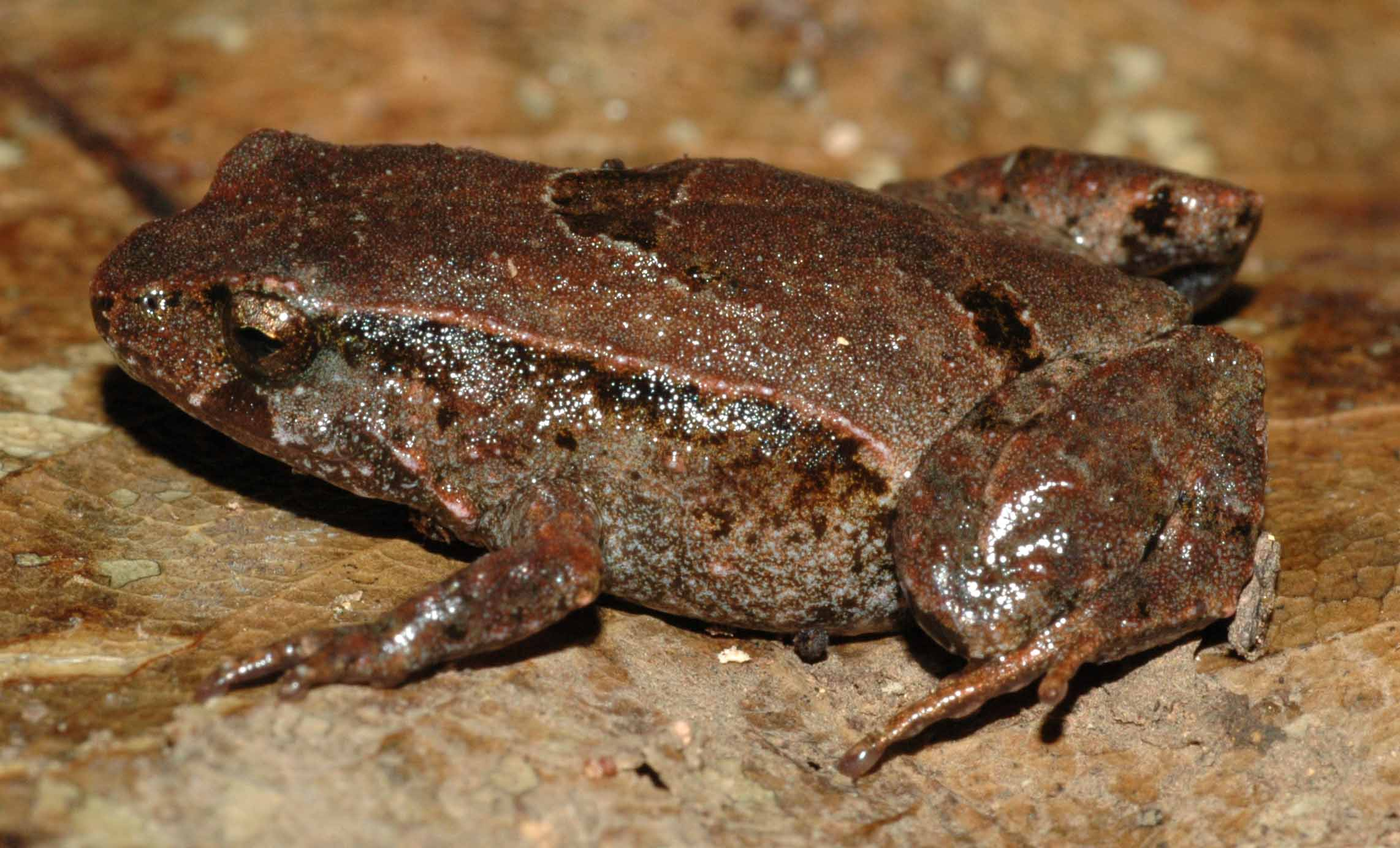

Conservation status
- Vulnerable (IUCN 3.1)

Scientific classification
- Kingdom: Animalia
- Phylum: Chordata
- Class: Amphibia
- Order: Anura
- Family: Myobatrachidae
- Genus: Assa
- Species: A. darlingtoni

Binomial name
- Assa darlingtoni Loveridge, 1933
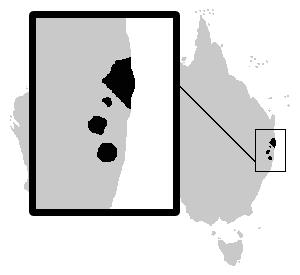
- Range of the pouched frog

= Pouched frog =

Species of amphibian

The pouched frog (Assa darlingtoni), or hip pocket frog, is a small, terrestrial frog found in rainforests in mountain areas of south-eastern Queensland and northern New South Wales, Australia. It is one of two species within the genus Assa, the other being Assa wollumbin and is part of the family Myobatrachidae.

== Description ==
It is a small frog about 2.5 cm long, red-brown in colour, with some individuals having reverse V-shaped patches and/or with light brown dots randomly on their backs. Most specimens have a darker brown stripe that runs from the nostril through the eye down the side of the body. A skin fold is present on either side of the frog running from its eye to its hip. Its hands and feet are completely free of webbing and discs, but the tips of the fingers and toes are swollen. The eye is gold with brown flecks and when the pupil is constricted it is horizontal. There is a 'pocket' on its hip where the frog's tadpoles travel to after hatching.

The hip-pocket frog living in Australia has been affected by the forest fires of Australia. The fires are not suitable for the pocket frog and is now classified as endangered and vulnerable. The frog has a unique reproductive method, where the male carries the developing tadpoles in the pouch by its hips until metamorphosis. The male species has a greater parental care in the development of the new organisms.

== Ecology and behaviour ==
This frog hides under logs, rocks, and leaf litter in rainforests and adjacent wet sclerophyll forests. It may call through the day but calling is most intense during dawn and dusk. Its call is a very quiet eh-eh-eh-eh-eh-eh, usually six to ten notes. This frog crawls rather than hops. Females are believed to first start breeding between 2 and 3 years and a single female may produce 1–50 eggs a year. Eggs are laid on the land (under decomposing logs, rock or leaf litter) as the tadpoles do not need water for metamorphosis. Breeding takes place during spring and summer. Both male and female frogs guard the nest of eggs and the male carries the tadpoles in the pouch once they have hatched. The tadpoles will reside in the pouch until they have morphed. In an article a study happened regarding frogs have a near-synchronous which could mean a sexual competition between the male frogs "In eight of nine pairs of semi-isolated males, there was sustained near-synchronous calling in bouts consisting of 16-20 calls and lasting 5-10min. There was extensive overlap of the pulsed calls, and calls of a lagging male began overlapping that of a leading male after 2-5 pulses of a leader's call note" (Clulow et.al, 2016).

As of September 2023, Assa darlingtoni is classified as Vulnerable under the Environment Protection and Biodiversity Conservation Act 1999.

== Similar species ==
The second species in the genus, Assa wollumbin, is smaller and reaches only 1.6 cm in leghth. Assa darlingtoni may be confused with some species of Philoria and Crinia, which live in the same area. Philoria species show thicker arms than Assa darlingtoni, Crinia species have a rougher belly texture.
