= Santa Fe Trail Historical Park =

California historic landmark

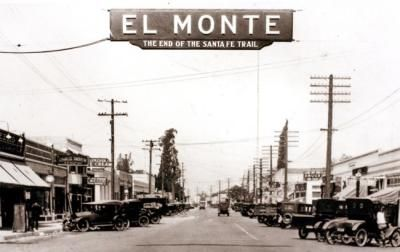
- Downtown El Monte, with sign: "El Monte the End of the Santa Fe Trail"

- Location within the Los Angeles metropolitan area
- 34°4′28″N 118°2′30″W
- Location: 3675 Santa Anita Ave, El Monte, CA 91731

History
- Built: 1822; 204 years ago

Site notes
- Area: one acre

California Historical Landmark
- Designated: Aug. 13, 1987
- Reference no.: 975

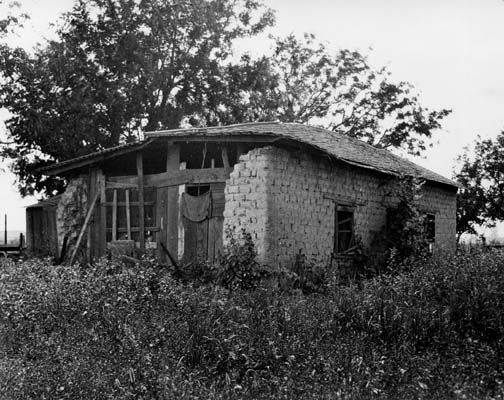
Oldest home in El Monte at the end of the Santa Fe Trail built in 1849, (photo from 1922)

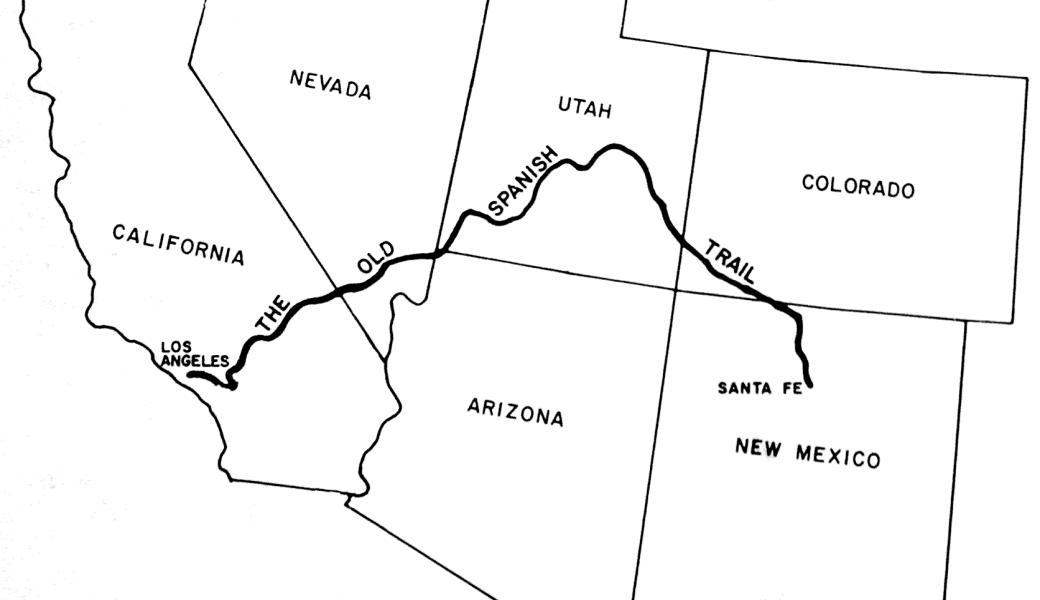
The route of the Old Spanish Trail

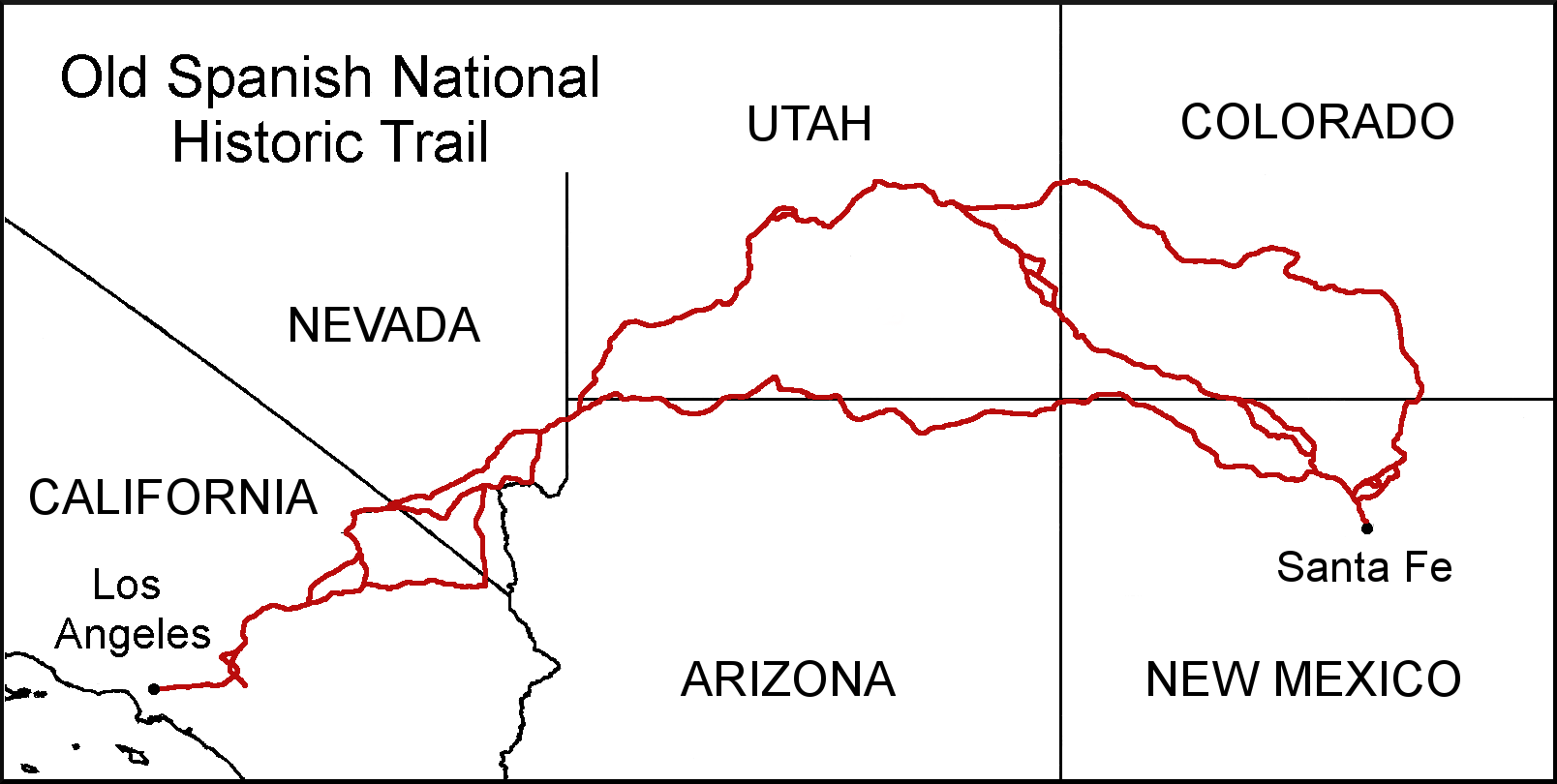
The route of the Old Spanish Trail

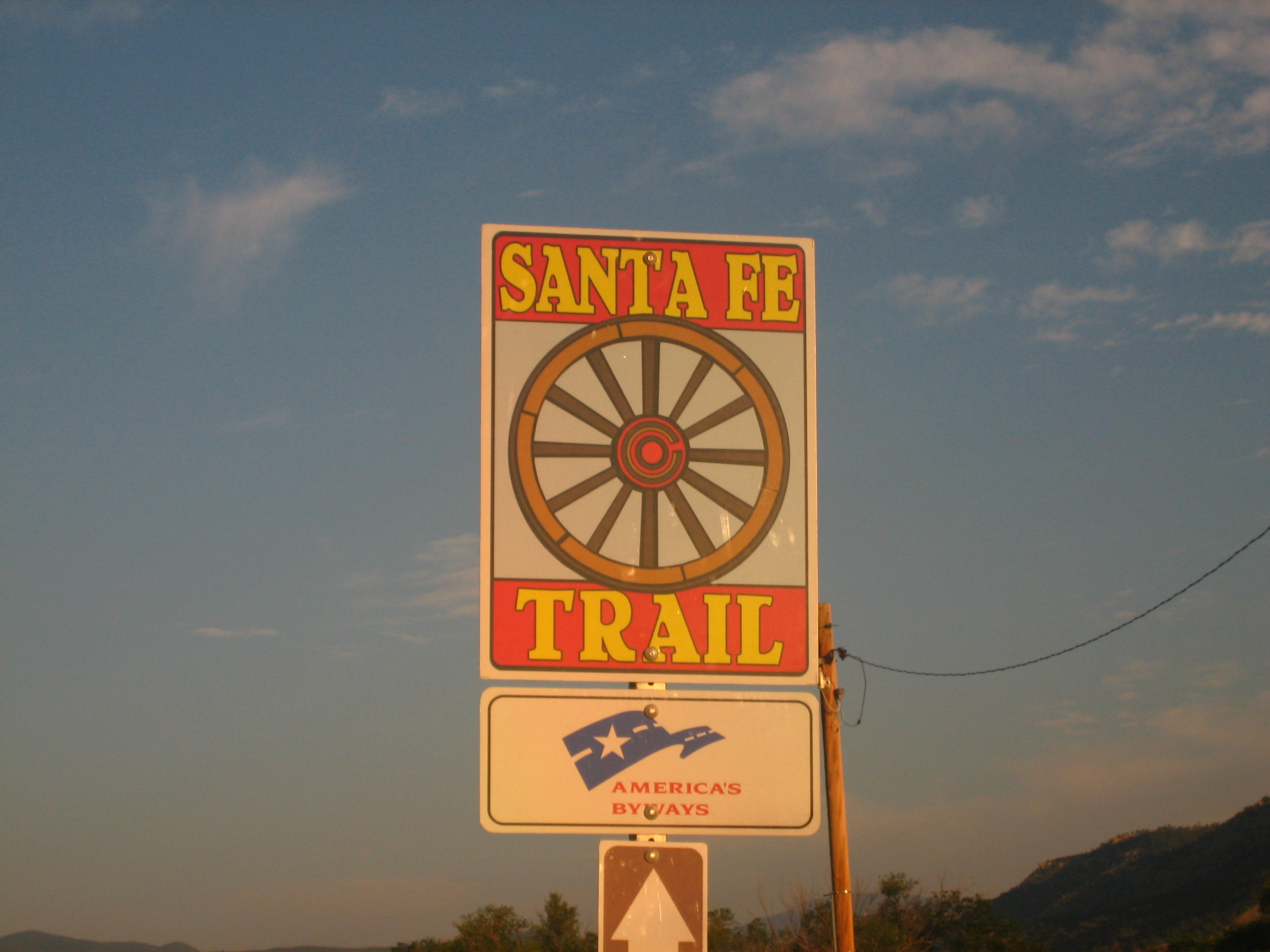
Santa Fe Trail highway sign in Cimarron, New Mexico

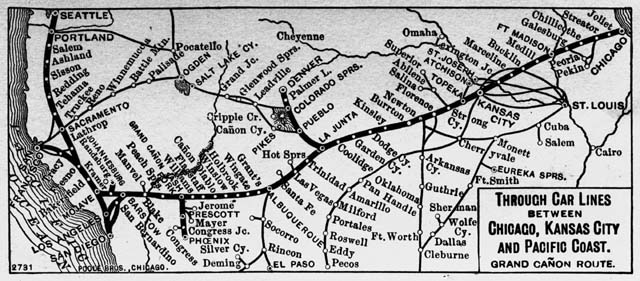
Connections along the Santa Fe Railroad, showing the principal regular stops on the AT&SF mainline, including cattle drive destinations such as Dodge City. It is no accident that most of those Kansas, Colorado, and New Mexican towns were also first serviced by the Santa Fe Trail.

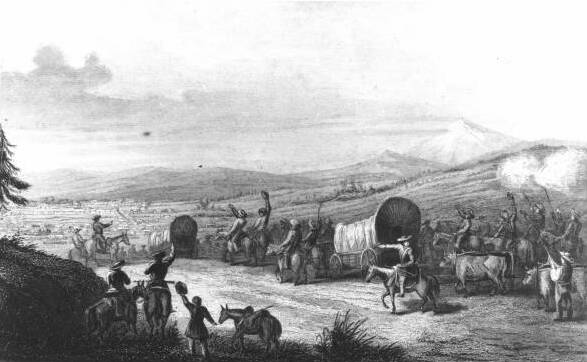
Arrival of the caravan at Santa Fe, lithograph published c.1844

Santa Fe Trail Historical Park, also called Pioneer Park, is located on the bank of the Rio Hondo River in El Monte, California. The location was designated a California Historic Landmark (No. 975) on Aug. 13, 1987. This was originally an encampment on the Old Spanish Trail. The Old Spanish Trail was an extension of the trail from Missouri to Santa Fe, New Mexico. The Gila River trail also ended in El Monte. By the 1850s, those in El Monte started to call the town the `End of the Santa Fe Trail." This claim is disputed by some, such as the Santa Fe in New Mexico. In the 1800s permanent settlements were established by immigrants from Texas and Arkansas, the first settlement in Southern California founded by citizens of the United States. The state marker for the Santa Fe Trail Historical Park is located at 3564 Santa Anita Ave, El Monte, CA 91731. The City of El Monte held a ceremony to dedicate the Santa Fe Trail Historical Park on June 2, 1989.

El Monte built the (now closed) Santa Fe Trail Historical Park in 1989, near Valley Blvd and Santa Anita Ave. The one-acre park has two historic structures and a covered wagon. The park is on the west side of Santa Anita Avenue, just a few blocks north of the Interstate 10 in California freeway and south of the El Monte City Hall. Soon after it opened, the park closed. The land was cleared in 2023 to begin construction on a new park. The El Monte Historical Museum at 3150 Tyler Avenue showcases the Santa Fe Trail and El Monte's Historical importance to Southern California.

== Marker ==
The state marker reads:

- El Monte, on the bank of the San Gabriel River, played a significant part in California's early pioneer history. It was first an encampment on the Old Spanish Trail, and extension of the trail from Missouri to Santa Fe. By the 1850s some began to call El Monte the "End of the Santa Fe Trail." Early in that decade a permanent settlement was established here by immigrants from Texas. The first settlement in Southern California founded by citizens of the United States.

== See also ==
- California Historical Landmarks in Los Angeles County
- Savannah Memorial Park
- List of California Ranchos
- Ranchos of Los Angeles County, California
- Mission San Gabriel Arcángel
