= Avraham Abaas =

Israeli politician (1912–1958)

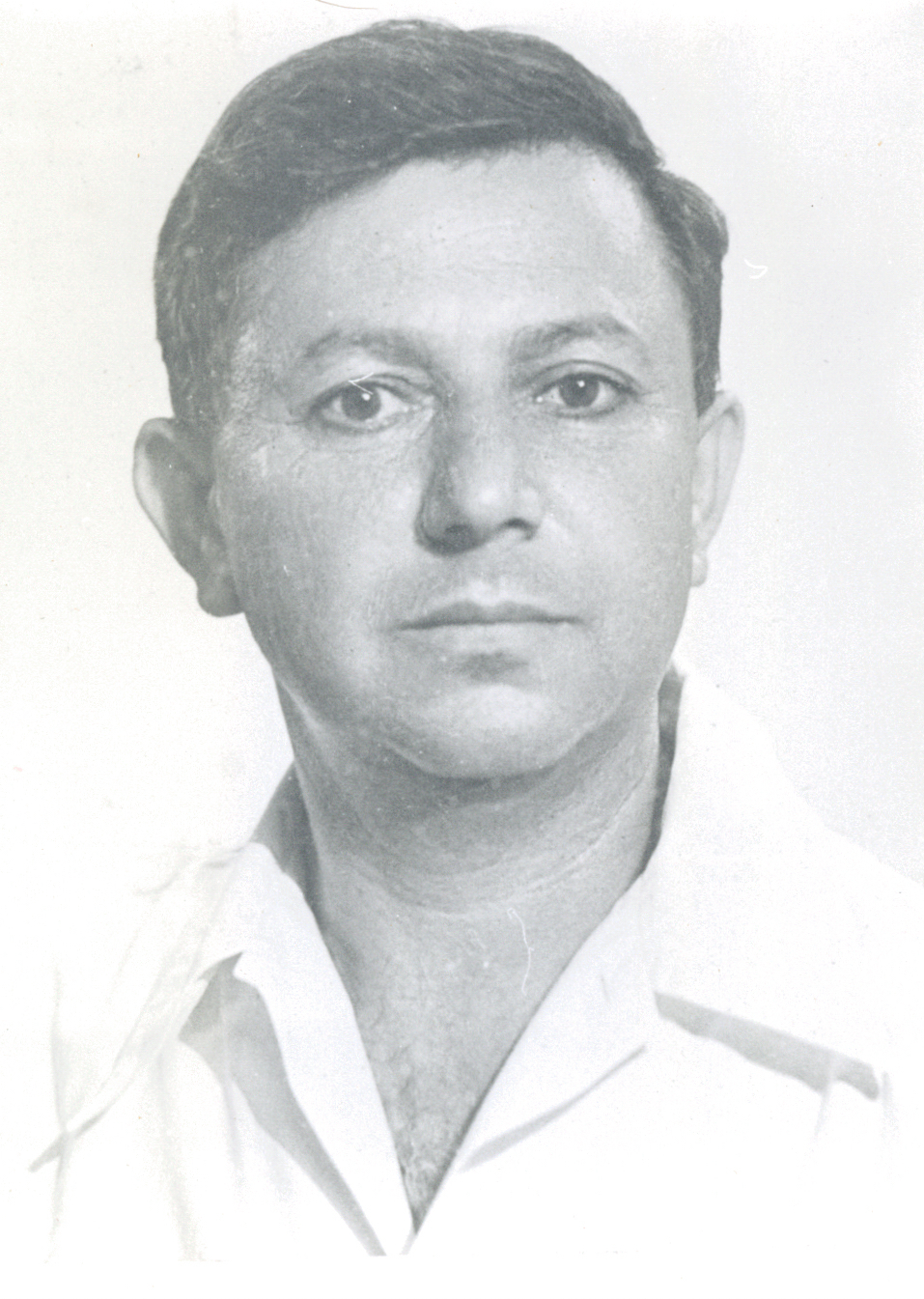
- Abaas in the 1950s

Faction represented in the Knesset
- 1955–1958: Ahdut HaAvoda

Personal details
- Born: 1912 Damascus, Ottoman Empire
- Died: 17 September 1958 (aged 45–46)

Avraham Abaas (Hebrew: אברהם עבאס; 1912 – 17 September 1958) was an Israeli politician who served as a member of the Knesset for Ahdut HaAvoda between 1955 and 1958.

== Biography ==
Born in Damascus in the Ottoman Empire (today in Syria), Abaas was one of the founders of the local HeHalutz branch. He emigrated to Mandatory Palestine in 1929 and joined kibbutz Kfar Giladi. He later returned to Syria as an emissary of the Histadrut, also working in Lebanon and encouraging immigration from both countries between 1931 and 1934, returning in 1941 to assist illegal immigration to Palestine.

In 1944 he became a member of the Assembly of Representatives for Ahdut HaAvoda, and also served on the Jewish National Council. He was elected to the Histadrut's executive committee in 1949, and to the directorate of the Sephardi Communities Association in 1951. In 1955 he was elected to the Knesset on the Ahdut HaAvoda list, but died whilst still an MK in 1958, his seat taken by Yerahmiel Assa.
