= Asa Ellis =

American politician

Asa Ellis (c. 1817–1890) served as a member of the 1867-69 California State Assembly, representing the 2nd District. He also served on the Los Angeles County Board of Supervisors in 1864. He is interred at Savannah Memorial Park Cemetery in Rosemead, California.
