= Asa G. Yancey Sr. =

American physician and professor (1916–2013)

Asa G. Yancey Sr. (August 19, 1916 – March 10, 2013) was an American physician who is professor emeritus, Emory University School of Medicine and former medical director of the Hughes Spalding Pavilion at Grady Memorial Hospital. Yancey graduated from Booker T. Washington High School in Atlanta, Georgia. He then went on to college and graduated with a Bachelor of Science degree from Morehouse College in 1937. He received his M.D. from the University of Michigan in 1941 and later studied general surgery under Dr. Charles R. Drew.

== Professional life ==
Yancey's early medical career includes service as a first lieutenant in the U.S. Army Medical Corps. He served as chief of surgery at the Tuskegee Veterans Administration Hospital from 1948 until 1958. In 1952, he published “A Modification of the Swenson Operation for Congenital Megacolon” ten years before Dr. Soave was credited for a similar medical procedure. In 1958, Yancey became the medical director of the Hughes Spalding Pavilion at Grady Memorial Hospital, (currently the Hughes Spalding Children's Hospital).

== Accomplishments and board memberships ==
In 1964, Yancey became the first African-American member of the medical faculty at Emory University and, along with other faculty members, is responsible for the development of the Cardiology Center at Emory. He is also Grady Memorial Hospital's first African-American doctor.

Yancey established the first accredited surgical residency for African-Americans in the state of Georgia and the state of Alabama. The Asa G. Yancey Medical Center of the Grady Health System in Atlanta, Georgia, is named in his honor. An archive collection called the Asa G. Yancey Papers are housed in the Auburn Avenue Research Library of the Atlanta-Fulton Public Library. The collection spans from 1938 to 2001, highlighting Yancey's medical career, his contribution to the field of medicine, selected articles and publications.

In 1973, Yancey was elected to the Institute of Medicine of the National Academies. He has served on several boards which include: the editorial board, Journal of the National Medical Association; Georgia Division of the American Cancer Society; the American College of Surgeons and the Atlanta Board of Education.

== Family life ==
Yancey was born to Arthur and Daisy Yancey. He and his wife Carolyn E. (Dunbar) Yancey are the parents of Arthur Yancey II, M.D., Caren Yancey-Covington (D), Carolyn Yancey, M.D. and Asa G. Yancey Jr., M.D.
