= Asa Andrew =

American writer

- Occupations: author, radio host, lifestyle medicine advocate

Asa Andrew, sometimes styled as "Dr. Asa, America's Health Coach", is an American author and radio host. He has a daily syndicated health talk radio show, Dr. Asa On Call; his book Empowering Your Health was published in 2007. In 2015 he was a member of the American College of Lifestyle Medicine.

== Radio and television ==
Andrew started his radio career with his radio show 'Dr. Asa On Call' which now airs 3 hours daily syndicated on networks including Cumulus Media, iHeart Radio, Salem Communications.

== Bibliography ==
- Empowering Your Health: Do You Want to Get Well?, Foreword by Dave Ramsey (Thomas Nelson Incorporated, 2007, ISBN 9781401603724)
