= Asa C. Matthews =

American politician

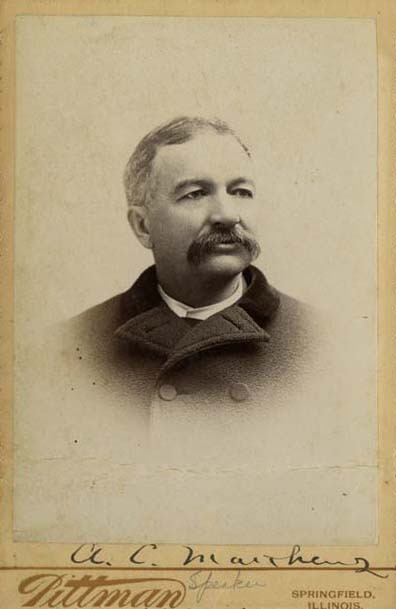
- Born: Asa Carrington Matthews; March 22, 1833; Pike County, Illinois, U.S.
- Died: June 14, 1908 (aged 75); Pike County, Illinois, U.S.
- Military career
- Allegiance: United States of America
- Branch: United States Army
- Rank: Colonel
- Unit: 99th Illinois Volunteer Infantry Regiment
- Conflicts: American Civil War
- Other work: Lawyer, judge, Republican Party politician, U.S. treasury comptroller

Asa Carrington Matthews (March 22, 1833 – June 14, 1908) was an American lawyer, judge, and politician.

== Early life and education ==
Born in Pike County, Illinois, Matthews went to the public schools. He went to McKendree College and Illinois College.

== Career ==
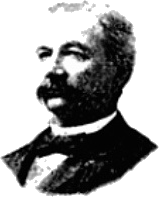
Matthews

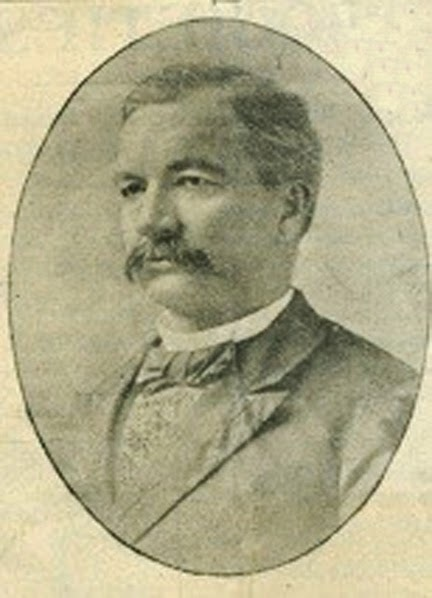
Matthews

In 1857, Matthew was admitted to the Illinois bar. During the American Civil War, Matthew served in the 99th Illinois Volunteer Infantry Regiment. On June 23, 1865, in Doaksville, OK Matthews accepted the surrender of Brigadier General Stand Waite, the last Confederate General to surrender in the Civil War. He then practiced law in Pittsfield, Illinois. Matthews was elected to the Illinois House of Representatives and served as the speaker. Matthews was a Republican. He also was appointed Illinois Circuit Court judge in 1885. Matthews also served as collector of the United States Internal Revenue. In 1889, President Benjamin Harrison appointed Matthews comptroller of the United States Treasury.

In 1893, Matthews wrote a vignette for the World's Fair predicting what life in the U.S. would be like 100 years in the future. His predictions were grandiose, predicting the U.S. having 60 states and controlling all of North America.

== Later life and education ==
Matthews died suddenly at his home in Pittsfield, Illinois.
