= Asa Burton =

American minister and theologian (1752–1836)

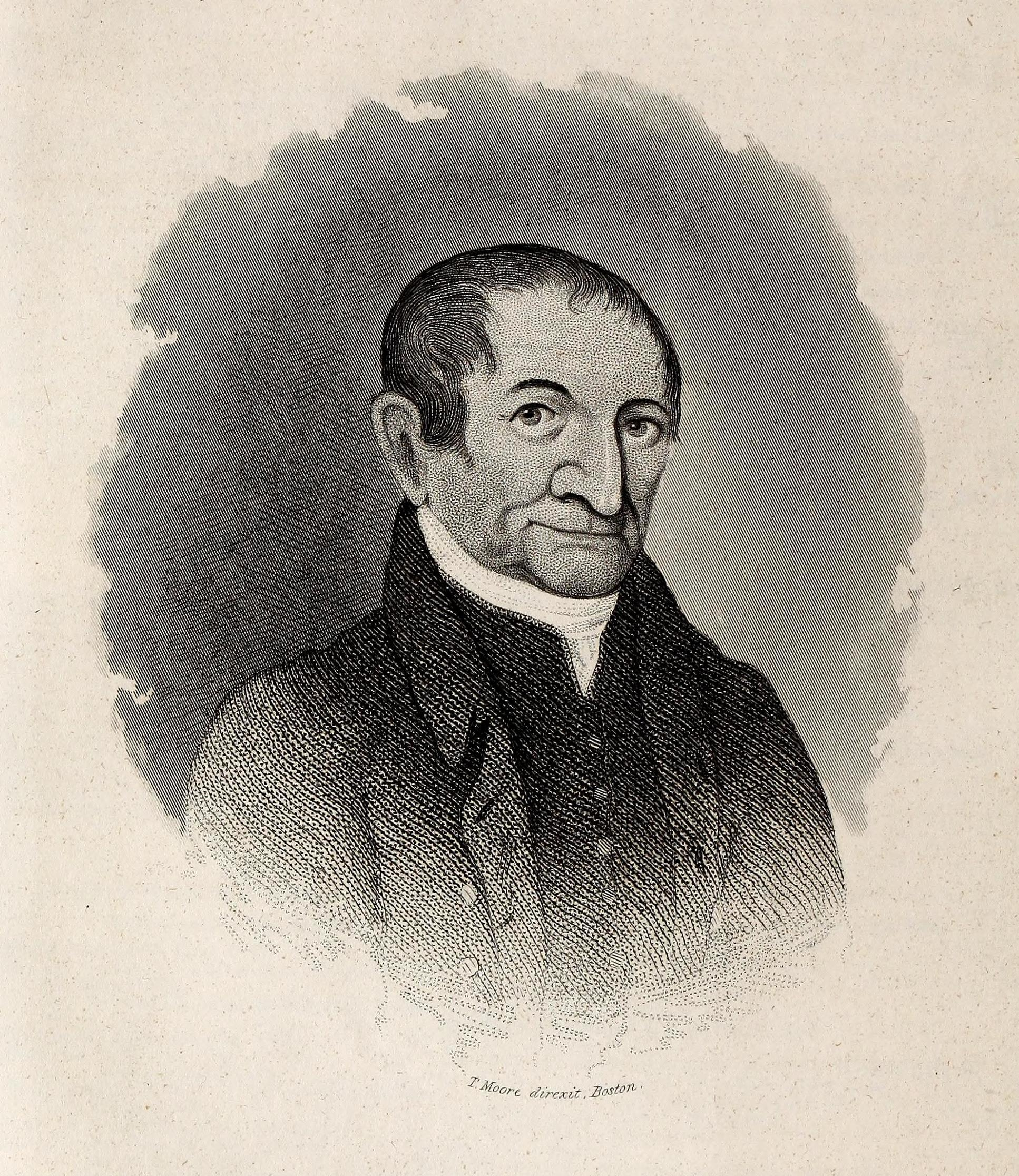
Engraving of Burton, 1838

Asa Burton (August 25, 1752 – May 1, 1836) was an American minister and theologian.

Asa Burton was born on August 25, 1752, in Stonington, Connecticut, to Rachel and Jacob Burton, the sixth child in a family of thirteen. His family moved to Preston when he was very young. When he was about fourteen, his father moved again to Norwich, Vermont.

Burton began studying at Dartmouth College around age 21. Shortly after he entered Dartmouth, many of his family members died. He graduated in 1777. He was licensed to preach in August or September of that year and was ordained as a minister on January 19, 1779. For most of his career, Burton's ministry was in Thetford, Vermont.

Burton taught theology from 1786 to 1816. He received a doctorate of divinity from Middlebury College in 1804. From 1809, he edited Advisor; Or, Vermont Evangelical Magazine. In 1824 he published a book called Essays on Some of the First Principles of Metaphysics, Ethics, and Theology.

In his Essays, Burton adopted a "taste" theology, which held that humans had an original inclination toward, or taste for, sin. Burton, as a "taster", opposed the "exercisers" including Nathanael Emmons, who distinguished between inclinations toward sin (tastes) and sinful acts (exercises). Burton's taste view developed Jonathan Edwards's theory that the will is not a distinct faculty; rather, according to Burton, the will is a manifestation of the human heart. Burton's emphasis on taste gave him and other tasters a way to deny that sinful behavior was caused by God. Rather, sin was caused by human inclination towards sin. This offered an alternative to the determinism of exercisers such as Emmons, who held that each of the soul's acts was caused by divine agency.

Burton died on May 1, 1836, in Thetford.

== Works cited ==
- Sprague, William Buell (1857). Annals of the American Pulpit; Or, Commemorative Notices of Distinguished American Clergymen of Various Denominations. Vol. 2. New York: Robert Carter & Brothers. pp. 140–145. OCLC 1012379908.
- Youngs, J. William T. (1990). The Congregationalists. Greenwood Press. pp. 223–225. OCLC 1148613773.
