= Yerahmiel Assa =

Israeli politician

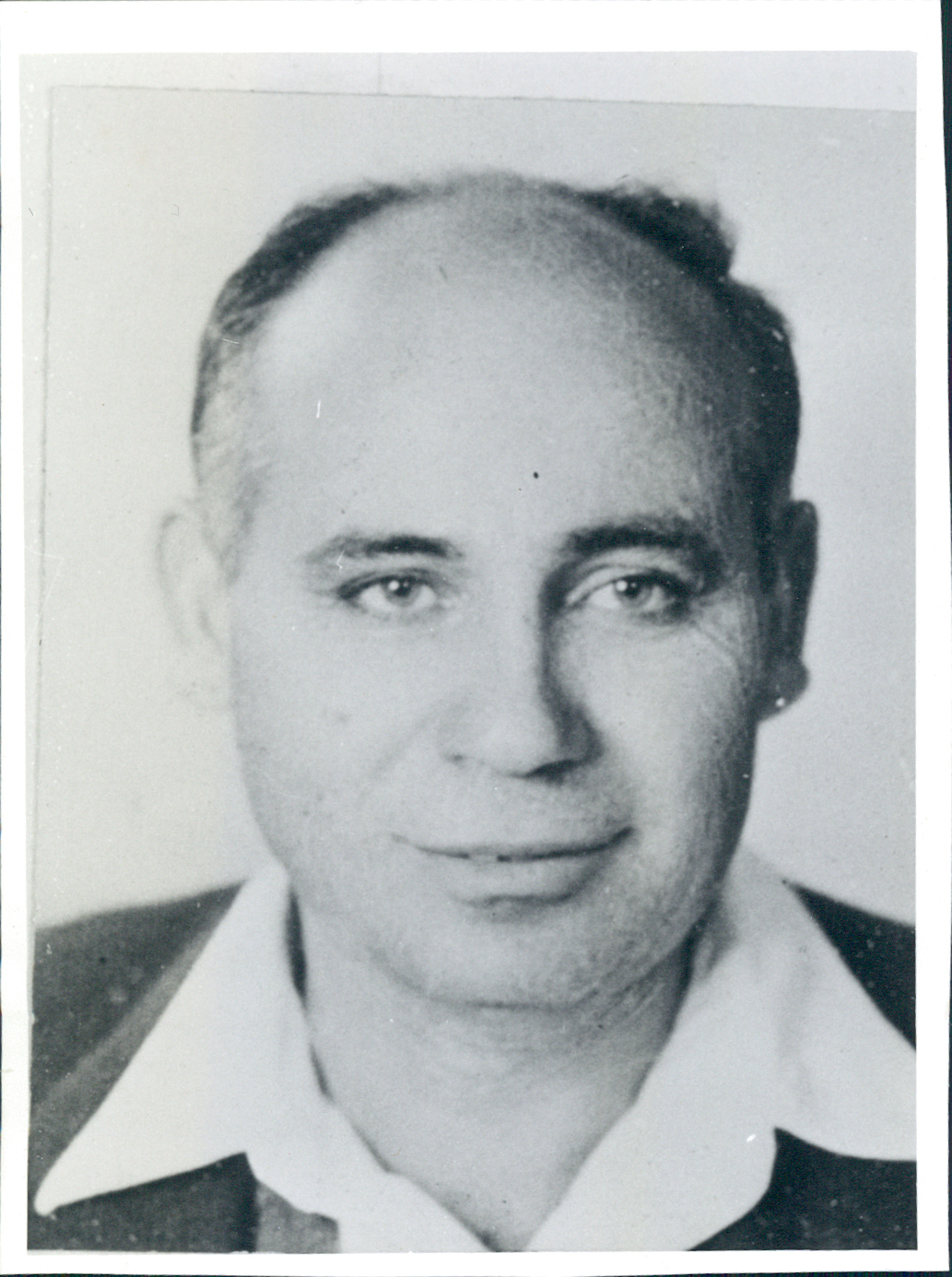
- Assa in the 1950s

Faction represented in the Knesset
- 1958–1959: Ahdut HaAvoda

Personal details
- Born: 7 March 1919 Soviet Union
- Died: 11 October 2011 (aged 92)

Yerahmiel Assa (Hebrew: ירחמיאל אסא; 7 March 1919 – 11 October 2011) was an Israeli politician who served as member of the Knesset for Ahdut HaAvoda between 1958 and 1959.

== Biography ==
Born Yerahmiel Asailov in the Caucasus area of the Soviet Union in 1919, Assa emigrated to Mandate Palestine in 1924. He studied at the HaNoar HaOved school in Tel Aviv and also a member of the movement. He also attended the Kibbutz Seminar in Tel Aviv, and was amongst the founders of kibbutz Hulata in 1946, where he worked as a teacher.

A member of the directorate of the Department for Middle Eastern Jews at the Jewish Agency, he served as an emissary of Mossad LeAliyah Bet in Iraq, and between 1953 and 1954 also worked in Iran and Turkey.

Assa was also a member of Ahdut HaAvoda, and was on the party's list for the 1955 elections. Although he failed to win a seat, he entered the Knesset on 19 September 1958 as a replacement for the deceased Avraham Abaas. However, he lost his seat in the 1959 elections.
