= Asa Cheffetz =

American artist and wood engraver

Asa Cheffetz (1896–1965) was an American artist and printmaker. Although he worked in various media, he is best known as a wood engraver.

== Biography ==
He was born in Buffalo, New York on August 16, 1896. He moved to Massachusetts as a young boy and lived and worked most of his life in Springfield, Massachusetts. His parents were both born in Russia and immigrated to the United States in 1891.

He studied with Philip Leslie Hale at the School of the Museum of Fine Arts, Boston, and then studied drawing and etching at the National Academy of Design in New York City. In New York City he roomed with and became a lifelong friend of artist Maxwell Stewart Simpson (1896-1984). Cheffetz' studies were interrupted by World War I, during which he served in United States Navy. Upon his discharge he returned to the Academy, but within a year he was forced to return to Springfield to help with the family’s movie theater business.

In 1927 he returned to art, specifically wood engraving, a medium which he was primarily self-taught. Cheffetz was a perfectionist paying meticulous attention to the detail and gradations of each piece. He personally printed his engravings. He produced most of his body of work in the 1930s and 1940s. In 1944 he designed and engraved the official bookplate for the Library of Congress.

He married Alice Dorr on June 11, 1950. Soon after Cheffetz began to suffer eye problems and at age 58 he was forced to give up wood-engraving. He became a salesman for a paper mill. Asa Cheffetz died in 1965, in Springfield, Massachusetts.

His works are in permanent collections of the American Antiquarian Society, Art Institute of Chicago, D’Amour Museum of Fine Arts (Springfield, Massachusetts), Baltimore Museum Art, Boston Public Library, Bowdoin College (ME), Carnegie Museum of Art (Pittsburgh, Pennsylvania), Cleveland Museum Art, Davis Museum at Wellesley College (Massachusetts), Emory University, Honolulu Academy of Fine Arts, Library of Congress, Los Angeles Museum, Memphis Brooks Museum of Art (Memphis, Tennessee), McNay Art Museum (San Antonio, Texas), Metropolitan Museum (New York), Museum of Fine Arts,(Boston) Newark Museum Art, New York Public Library, Pennsylvania Academy Fine Arts, Philadelphia Museum of Art, Polish State Art Collection (Warsaw, Poland), Portland Art Museum (Maine), Princeton University, Rhode Island School of Design Museum, Shelburne Museum (Vermont), Smithsonian American Art Museum, Springfield (Massachusetts) City Library, Washington County Museum (Hagerstown, Maryland), Wesleyan University (Middletown, Connecticut), and Worcester Art Museum (Massachusetts).

His work was included in the Fifty Prints of the Year in 1929 and 1934. His work was chosen for exhibition at the Century of Progress Exposition, The Exposition Internationale des Arts et Techniques dans la Vie Moderne in Pais in 1937, and the 1939 New York World’s Fair. His wood etching Peacefull Valley was selected as the Print Club of Albany (NY) The Annual Print for 1943-1944. A one-man exhibition was held in 1984 at the Museum of Fine Arts, Springfield, Massachusetts. In connection with the show a catalogue raisonné of his works was published.
