= Surinder Singh Kanda v Federation of Malaya =

B Surinder Singh Kanda v. The Government of the Federation of Malaya, [1962] 1 MLJ 169 is a Malaysian case heard before the Privy Council of the United Kingdom, which ruled that in a case of conflict between existing laws and the Federal Constitution of Malaysia, the latter prevails and as such it is necessary for the courts to modify the existing laws under article 162 of the Federal Constitution and that members of the Public Service Commission were guaranteed the rules of natural justice, including the right to know the case made against him or her, the evidence given and the statements made affecting him or her and he or she must be given a fair opportunity to correct or contradict them under article 135(2) of the Federal Constitution. The Privy Council held that the Commissioner of the Royal Federation of Police Force had acted without proper authority and the appellant was not given a reasonable opportunity to be heard, deeming his dismissal void and inoperative.

== Background ==
B Surinder Singh Kanda, the appellant, was an inspector in the Royal Federation of Malaya Police Force (now the Royal Malaysia Police) and was first appointed on probation in 1951 and permanently appointed to the rank of inspector on June 1, 1953. On July 7, 1958, he was dismissed by the Commissioner of Police, prompting him to commence proceedings against the commissioner on October 1, 1959. He asked for a declaration and other consequential reliefs stating, inter alia, that his alleged dismissal on July 7, 1958, was void and inoperative and of no effect and that he was still a member of the Police Force on the grounds that: (a) the dismissal had been given effect by an authority subordinate to that which at the time of dismissal had power to appoint a member of the Police Force of equal rank and that this was contrary to article 135(1) of the Federal Constitution and (b) it was given effect without him being given a reasonable opportunity of being heard at the board of inquiry held by the Police Force and that it was contrary to article 135(2) of the Federal Constitution and natural justice.

At the High Court stage, the trial judge ruled in favour of the appellant, providing that article 144(1) of the Federal Constitution was to be read with article 135(1) of the Federal Constitution at the material time and that the power to appoint and consequently, the power to dismiss officers of his rank was vested in the Police Service Commission and that the Commissioner of Police was an authority subordinate to the Police Commission and as such he had no power to dismiss him.

Article 144 - Functions of Service Commissions

(1) Subject to the provisions of any existing law and to the provisions of this Constitution, it shall be the duty of a Commission to which this Part applies to appoint, confirm, emplace on the permanent or pensionable establishment, promote, transfer and exercise disciplinary control over members of the service or services to which its jurisdiction extends.

In addition, even if the Commissioner had the power to dismiss the appellant's dismissal as actually given effect was contrary to natural justice and in breach of the Federal Constitution because the appellant was not afforded a reasonable opportunity of being heard. The trial judge granted the declaration that the dismissal was void, inoperative and of no effect and that he was still a member of the Police Force. Aggrieved, the Government of the Federation of Malaya appealed to the Court of Appeal, which allowed the appeal and held that the appellant was validly dismissed. The appellant then appealed to the Privy Council, which accepted his request to hear his case.

== Decision ==
The case was presided over by a bench of three Lord Justices of the Privy Council, empanelled by Lord Denning, Lord Hodson and Lord Devlin. The Privy Council of the United Kingdom issued its decision on April 2, 1962. In a unanimous 3-0 decision, the Privy Council held that the Commissioner of the Police Force was not empowered with the authority to dismiss the appellant and that the appellant was deprived of his right to be heard as part of the rules of natural justice under article 135(2) of the Federal Constitution. The unanimous judgement was written by Lord Denning and joined by Lord Hodson and Lord Devlin.

=== The Power of the Commissioner of the Police Force to Dismiss ===
In addressing the issue on the power of the Commissioner of the Royal Federation of Malaya Police Force to dismiss the appellant, Lord Denning firstly examined article 135(1) of the Federal Constitution, which states:

Article 135 - Restriction on dismissal and reduction in rank

(1) No member of any of the services mentioned (the police service is one of these) shall be dismissed or reduced in rank by an authority subordinate to that which, at the time of the dismissal or reduction, has power to appoint a member of that service of equal rank.

His Lordship propounded that in order to see who had power to dismiss the appellant, it was necessary under the said provision to inquire into who had power at that time to appoint an officer of his rank, for no one could dismiss those who could not appoint. Lord Denning further scrutinised that according to section 9(1) of the Police Ordinance 1952 (now the Police Act 1967), which was the law as it existed prior to Merdeka Day, the Commissioner of Police could appoint superior police officers, including inspectors of police and if an inspector had been found guilty of an offence against discipline, the Commissioner of Police could dismiss him following the procedure laid down in section 45(1) of the said Ordinance.

Lord Denning further remarked that as soon as the Yang di-Pertuan Agong appointed the Police Service Commission, the said Commission gained jurisdiction over all members of the police service and had the power to appoint and dismiss them. Therefore, under article 144(1) of the Federal Constitution, the functions of the Police Service Commission were "subject to the provisions of any existing law", but this meant only such provisions were consistent with the Police Service Commission carrying out the duty entrusted to it.

His Lordship opined that if there was in any respect a conflict between the existing law and the Federal Constitution of Malaysia, such as to impede the functioning of the Police Service Commission in accordance with the Federal Constitution, then the existing law would have to be modified so as to accord with the Federal Constitution, provided by the compass of article 162 of the Federal Constitution:

Article 162 - Existing laws

(1) Subject to the following provisions of this Article and Article 163*, the existing laws shall, until repealed by the authority having power to do so under this Constitution, continue in force on and after Merdeka Day, with such modifications as may be made therein under this Article and subject to any amendments made by federal or State law.

(6) Any court or tribunal applying the provision of any existing law which has not been modified on or after Merdeka Day under this Article or otherwise may apply it with such modifications as may be necessary to bring it into accord with the provisions of this Constitution.

(7) In this Article "modification" includes amendment, adaptation and repeal.

Furthermore, Lord Denning opined that the Yang di-Pertuan Agong could have made modifications in the existing law within the first two years after Merdeka Day pursuant to article 162(4) of the Federal Constitution, which currently, has been repealed. However, the Yang di-Pertuan Agong did not make any modifications in the powers of the Commissioner of Police and it was too late for him to do so. In the circumstances, His Lordship noted that it was necessary and expedient for the courts to modify the existing law to bring it into accord with the Constitution under article 162(6) of the Federal Constitution, stating that in a conflict between existing law and the Federal Constitution, the Federal Constitution prevails.

Lord Denning then stated that the necessary modification was that since Merdeka Day, it was the Police Service Commission, and not the Commissioner of Police, which had the power to appoint members of the police service. The Police Service Commission had in fact made the appointments and thus were lawfully made. His Lordship further explained that the commission had the duty, and therefore the power, to appoint all members of the police service and not merely the gazetted police officers. In addition, the Police Service Commission can delegate any of its functions under article 144(6) of the Federal Constitution but it has its own duty and its own power that it delegates. It remained throughout therefore the authority which has power to appoint, even when it does it by a delegate.

Lord Denning concluded that on July 7, 1958, the Police Service Commission was the authority to appoint an officer of the rank of Inspector Kanda, the appellant, and therefore under article 135(1) of the Federal Constitution, it was the authority to dismiss him. Consequently, the Commissioner of Police had no authority to dismiss the appellant as he did and the dismissal was therefore void and had no operative effect.

=== The Reasonable Opportunity of Being Heard ===
Lord Denning referred to article 135(2) of the Federal Constitution in analysing the concept of the right to a fair hearing enshrined in the Federal Constitution of Malaysia:

Article 135 - Restriction on dismissal and reduction in rank

(2) No member of such a service as aforesaid (the police service is one of these) shall be dismissed or reduced in rank without being given a reasonable opportunity of being heard.

Lord Denning elaborated that the rule against bias and the right to be heard are essential characteristics encompassed in the rules of natural justice, which derived from the Roman maxims: Nemo judex in causa sua (no one is a judge in his own case) and Audi alteram partem (let the other side be heard as well), connoting impartiality and fairness. However, His Lordship stated that the two maxims are separate concepts and are governed by separate considerations. Lord Denning further opined that if the right to be heard was to be a real right, it must carry with it a right in the accused person to know the case which was made against him, in which he or she must know what evidence which has been given and what statements have been made affecting him or her, and then he or she must be given a fair opportunity to correct or contradict them, affirming the judgement of Lord Chancellor Loreburn in the House of Lords case of Board of Education v Rice [1911] AC 179.

Moreover, His Lordship postulated that a judge or whoever has to adjudicate must not hear evidence or receive representations from one side behind the back of the other and that the courts will not enquire whether the evidence or representations did work to his or her prejudice. The courts will not go into the likelihood of prejudice since the risk of it is enough and no one, who had lost a case, will believe he or she had been fairly treated if the other side had had access to the judge without him or her knowing.

Lord Denning then deduced that the appellant was not given a reasonable opportunity of being heard because the furnishing of a copy of the findings of the Board of Inquiry to the adjudicating officer appointed to hear the disciplinary charges of the appellant, coupled with the fact that no such copy was furnished to the appellant, amounted to a denial of natural justice as to entitle the court to set aside the proceedings on such a ground. It hence amounted to a failure to afford the appellant a reasonable opportunity of being heard in answer to the charge preferred against him which resulted in his dismissal.

His Lordship also conceded that the mistake of the police authorities was no doubt made entirely in good faith and it was proper to let the adjudicating officer have the statements of the witnesses. The Police Regulations showed that it was necessary for him to have them and the adjudicating officer will then read them out in the presence of the appellant. However, His Lordship noted that it was incorrect to let the adjudicating officer have the report of the Board of Inquiry unless the appellant also had it so as to be able to correct or contradict the statements in it to his prejudice.

Lord Denning finally concluded that the remedies of certiorari and declaration were made available to the appellant. Moreover, there was some question at one time as to the scope of the declaration but His Lordship, together with the other two Lord Justices, noted that it should be limited to the date of the dismissal.

== Outcome ==
The Privy Council filed a report on their judicial opinion to the Head of the Federation, which included, inter alia, that the appellant's appeal was allowed, the judgement of the Court of Appeal was to be set aside and a declaration that the dismissal of the appellant from the Federation of Malaya Police Force purported to be given effect by the Commissioner of Police of the Federation of Malaya on the July 7, 1958 was void, inoperative and of no effect. Additionally, the respondents were to pay the costs of the appellant before the Privy Council and in the Court of Appeal and the High Court.
