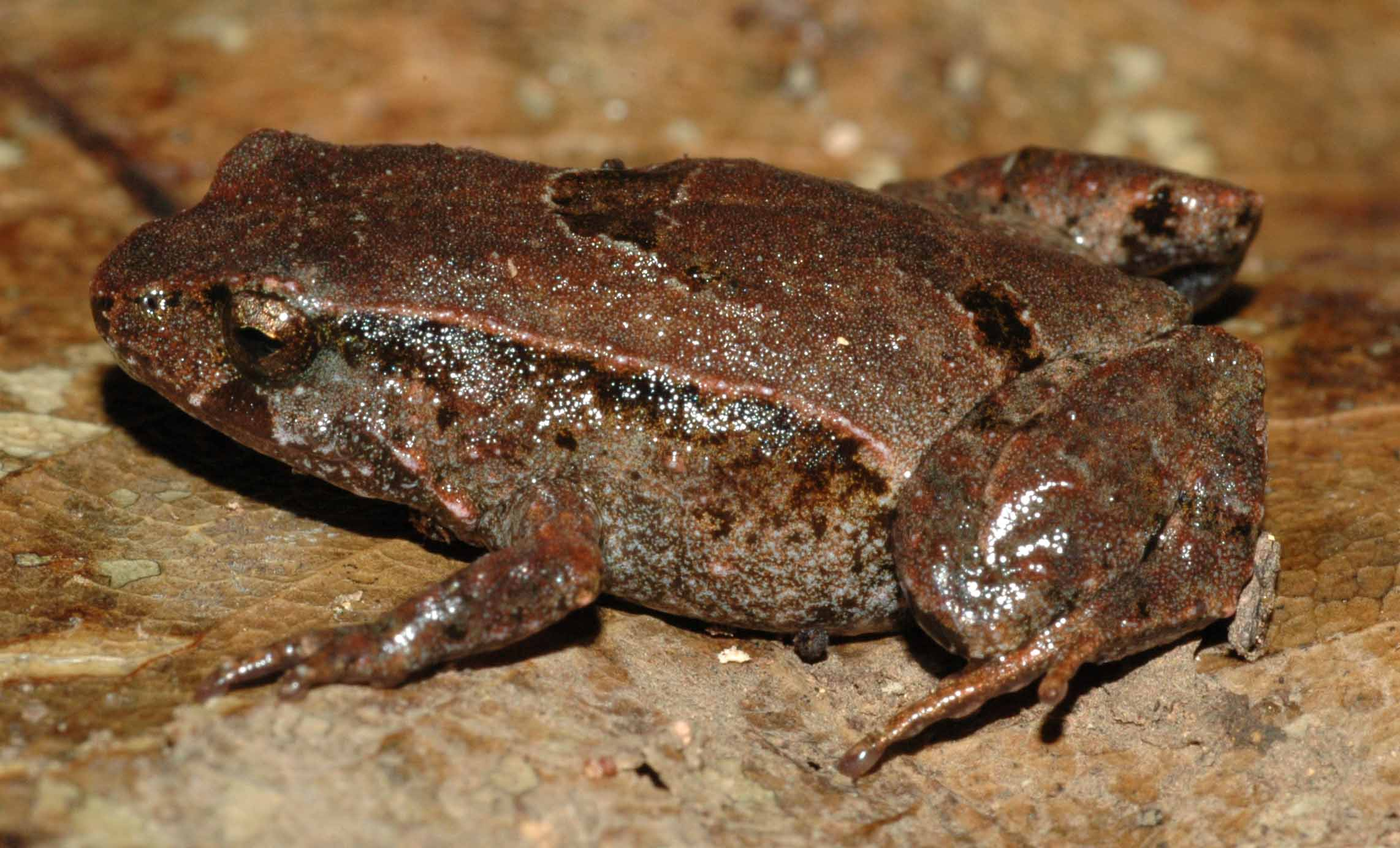
- A. darlingtoni

Scientific classification
- Kingdom: Animalia
- Phylum: Chordata
- Class: Amphibia
- Order: Anura
- Family: Myobatrachidae
- Genus: Assa; Tyler, 1972

Species
- A. darlingtoni; A. wollumbin

= Assa (frog) =

Genus of frog

Assa is a genus of frogs in the family Myobatrachidae. These frogs are endemic to a few parts of eastern Australia.

Both species are found on a few mountains in Queensland and New South Wales. For a significant portion of time, the only species in this genus was the pouched frog (A. darlingtoni). However, a second species, A. wollumbin, was described in 2021 following a rangewide genetic survey of A. darlingtoni. Both species are notable in that the males have subcutaneous pouches on their hips in which they carry their tadpoles until they metamorphosize.

== Species ==
Common name	Binomial name
Pouched frog, hip-pocket frog, or Australian marsupial frog	Assa darlingtoni (Loveridge, 1933)
Wollumbin pouched frog or Mount Wollumbin hip-pocket frog	Assa wollumbin Mahony, Hines, Mahony, Moses, Catalano, Myers, and Donnellan, 2021
