= Åsa Elzén =

Swedish artist

- Born: Sweden
- Education: Royal University College of Fine Art in Stockholm, Whitney Museum of American Art’s Independent Study Program
- Website: http://www.asaelzen.com

Åsa Elzén (born 1972) is a Swedish artist.

She has participated in events, performances, public talks and seminars including at The Armory Show New York; and Lilith Performance Studio, Malmö, Sweden.

== Education ==
Elzén studied sculpture at the National College of Art, Dublin in the nineties. She received an M.F.A. from the Royal University College of Fine Art in Stockholm in 2002 and was a participant in the Whitney Museum of American Art’s Independent Study Program from 2007 to 2008.

== Exhibitions (selection) ==
- 2012 Mary Wollstonecraft’s Scandinavian journey 1795 re-traced, uqbar, Berlin, curated by Antje Weitzel
- 2012 Mary Wollstonecraft’s Scandinavian journey 1795 re-traced, Kalmar Konstmuseum, Kalmar, Sweden, curated by Martin Schibli
- 2009 The guide and the seeing man, Eskilstuna Konstmuseum, Eskilstuna, Sweden
- 2005 Systerskapets år/A Year of Sisterhood as archive, in collaboration with Sonia Hedstrand, ak28, Stockholm, curated by Johanna Gustafsson-Fürst
- 2004 Woojegil Museum, exhibition and workshop in collaboration with Ylva Elzén in connection with the 5th Gwangju Biennale, South Korea, curated by Jongkee Chae

== Publications ==
- 1997. Stilleben in Sodom: 9.12.1997- 18.1.1998.
- 2012. Who fooled whom? Mary Wollstonecraft's Scandinanian journey 1795 re-traced. [Berlin]: : Åsa Elzén.
