= Dimes v Grand Junction Canal =

1852 UK legal case on judicial bias

- Decided: 1852

Case history
- Related action: House of Lords

Court membership
- Judge sitting: Lord Chancellor

Keywords
- Equity law

Dimes v Grand Junction Canal (1852) was a case heard by the House of Lords.

The case addresses the point that "Judges must not appear to be biased". Lord Cottenham presided over a previous case in which a canal company brought a case in equity against a landowner. Lord Cottenham was later discovered to have had shares in said company. The verdict stated that although there was no suggestion that the Lord Chancellor had in fact been influenced by his interest in the company, no case should be decided by a judge with a financial interest in the outcome. It was held that the Lord Chancellor was disqualified from sitting as a judge in the case because he had an interest in the action.
