= Xavery =

Xavery is a surname. Notable people with the name include:

- Frans Xavery (1740–after 1772), Dutch painter
- Gerard Joseph Xavery (1700–1747), Dutch painter
- Jacob Xavery (1736–after 1771), Dutch painter
- Jan Baptist Xavery (1697–1742), Flemish sculptor
- Pieter Xavery (1647–after 1674), Flemish Baroque sculptor
