= Old City Hall (The Hague) =

Building in The Hague, Netherlands

Coordinates: 52°4′40″N 4°18′30″E

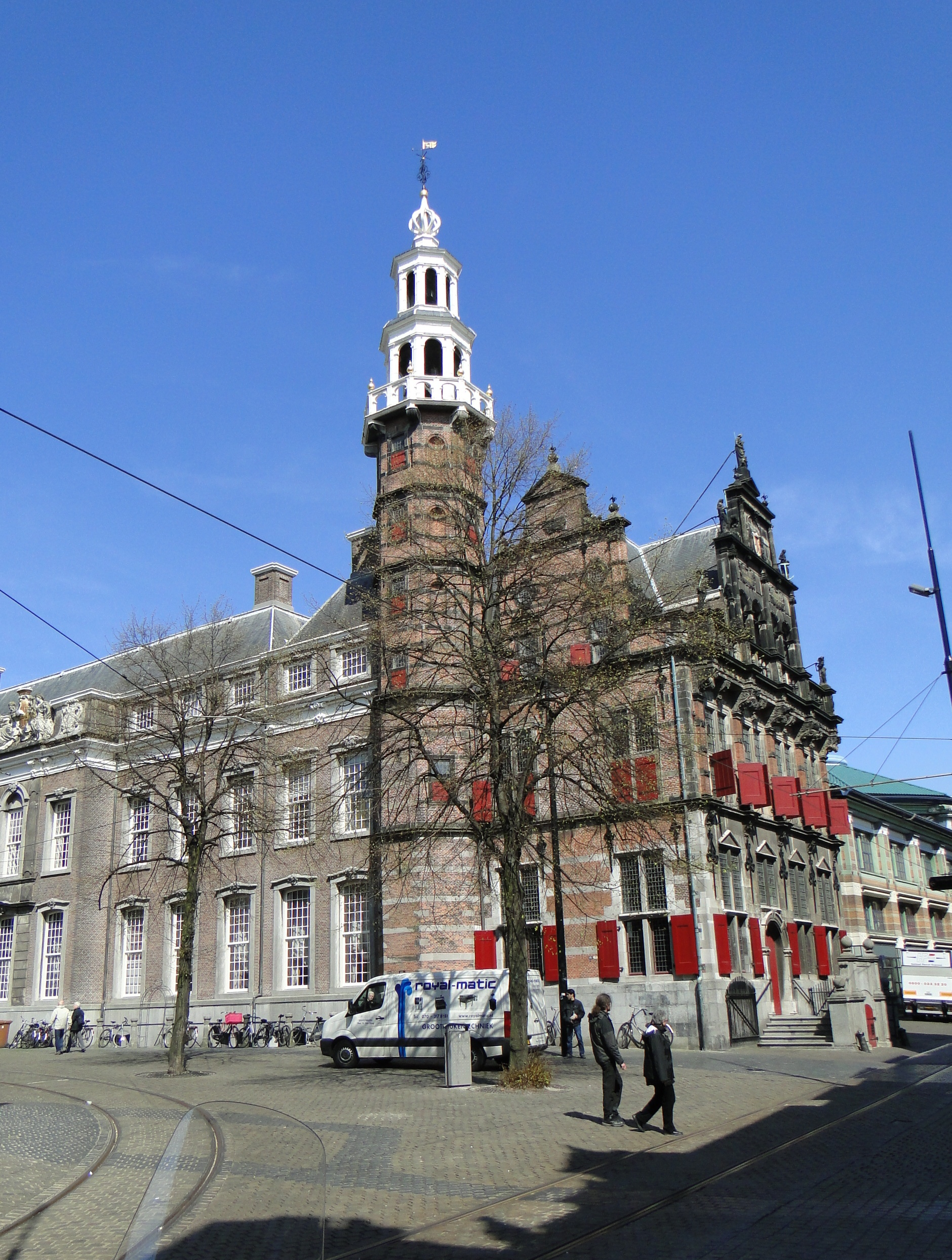
Old City Hall of The Hague on the Groenmarkt, seen from the Nieuwstraat. It was built in 1564 replacing the count's castle. The tower in the background is possibly built on the remnants of the older castle called Hof van Brederode.

The Old City Hall in The Hague is a Renaissance-style building on the Groenmarkt near the Grote Kerk. It is the former seat of the city's government, and remains a place where residents hold civic wedding ceremonies, and where the royal family register their family births. Other families do this at the current city hall located in the large white building on the Kalvermarkt, near the public library.

== History ==
The town hall (built in 1565 and restored and enlarged in 1882) contains a historical picture gallery. The building was considered very large and imposing in its day; just after it was built in 1566 Lodovico Guicciardini referred to The Hague as the most beautiful, richest, and biggest village of Europe. However, The Hague was not a walled town and therefore Guicciardini categorized it with the villages. For a village, the city hall must have seemed quite grand. That The Hague was thus vulnerable to attack makes it all the more amazing that the old city hall survived the Protestant Revolution without damage to older ornaments and windows.

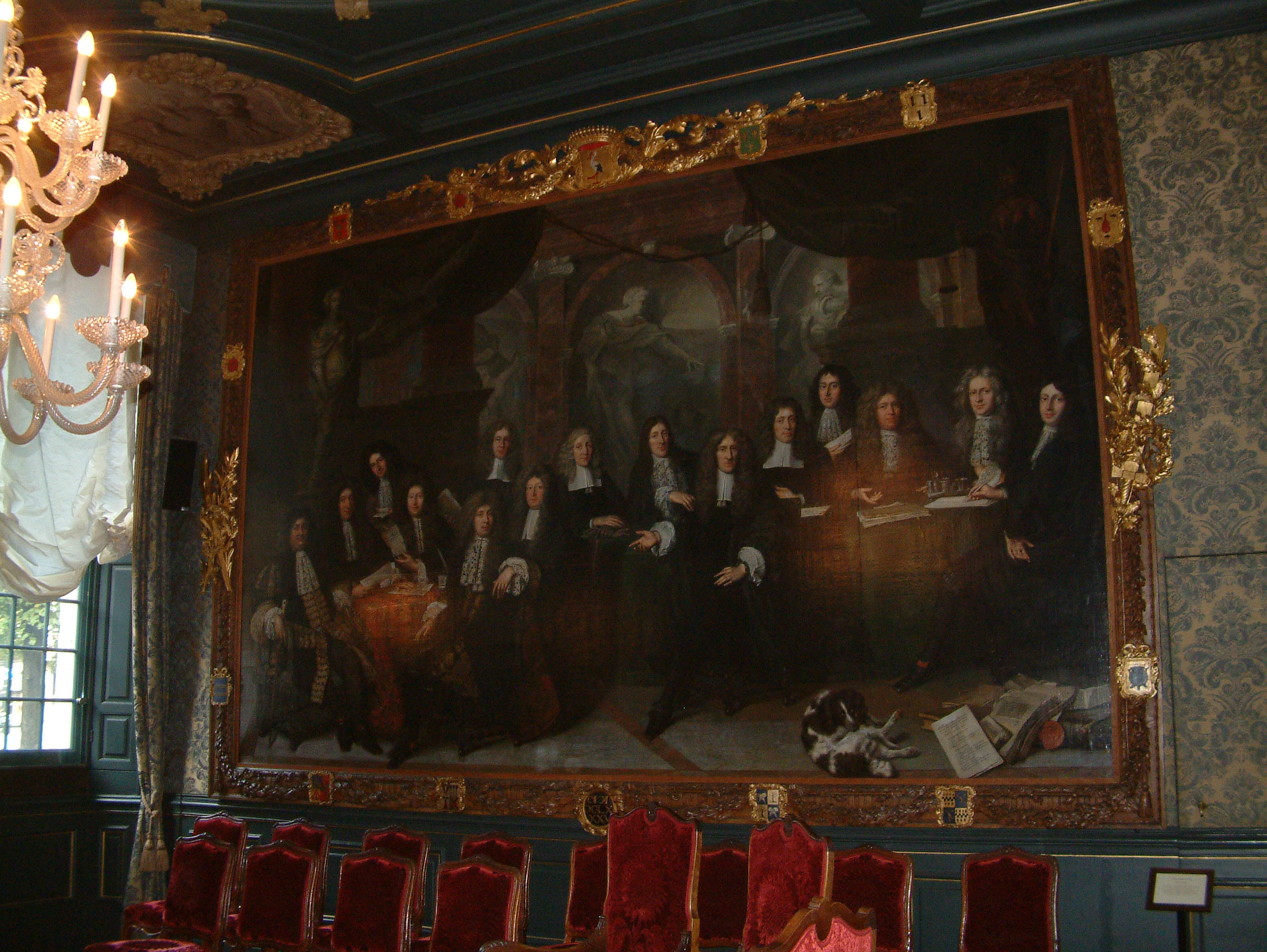
Group portrait of magistrates standing before an allegorical presentation of Salomon's judgement, 1682 by Jan de Baen

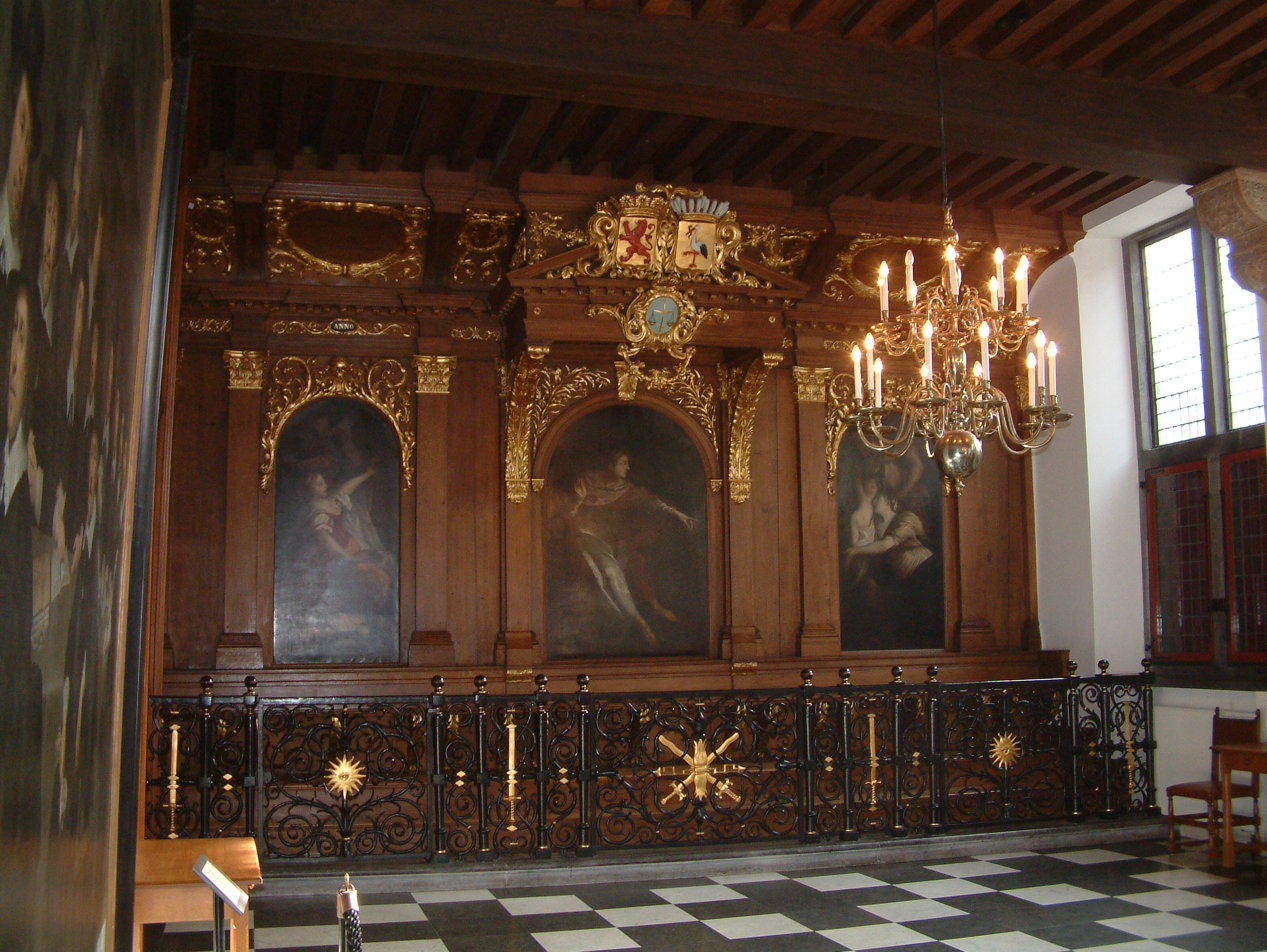
Vierschaar with three paintings by Willem Doudijns

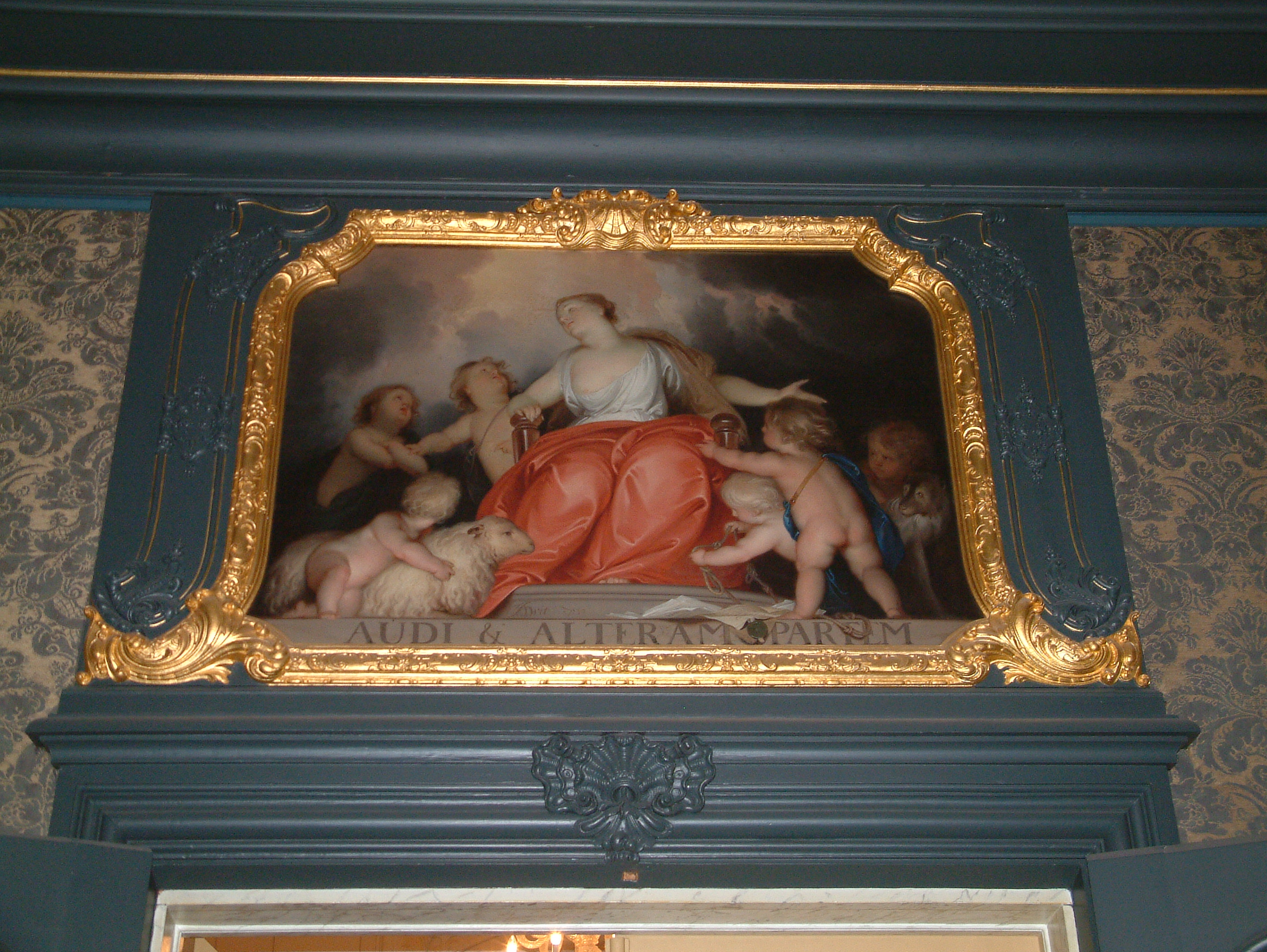
Overdoor by Jacob de Wit illustrating Audi alteram partem

The interior of the building underwent a number of changes over time, including restoration of the interior decorations that ended in 1773. The statues on the facade depict "Faith", "Hope", "Love", "Strength", and "Justice". They were made by the Hague sculptor Jan Baptist Xavery before 1742.

A number of paintings and objects from The Hague's artists of the Confrerie Pictura are found inside the building.

== See also ==
- The Hague City Hall
