= Albert Xavery =

Flemish sculptor

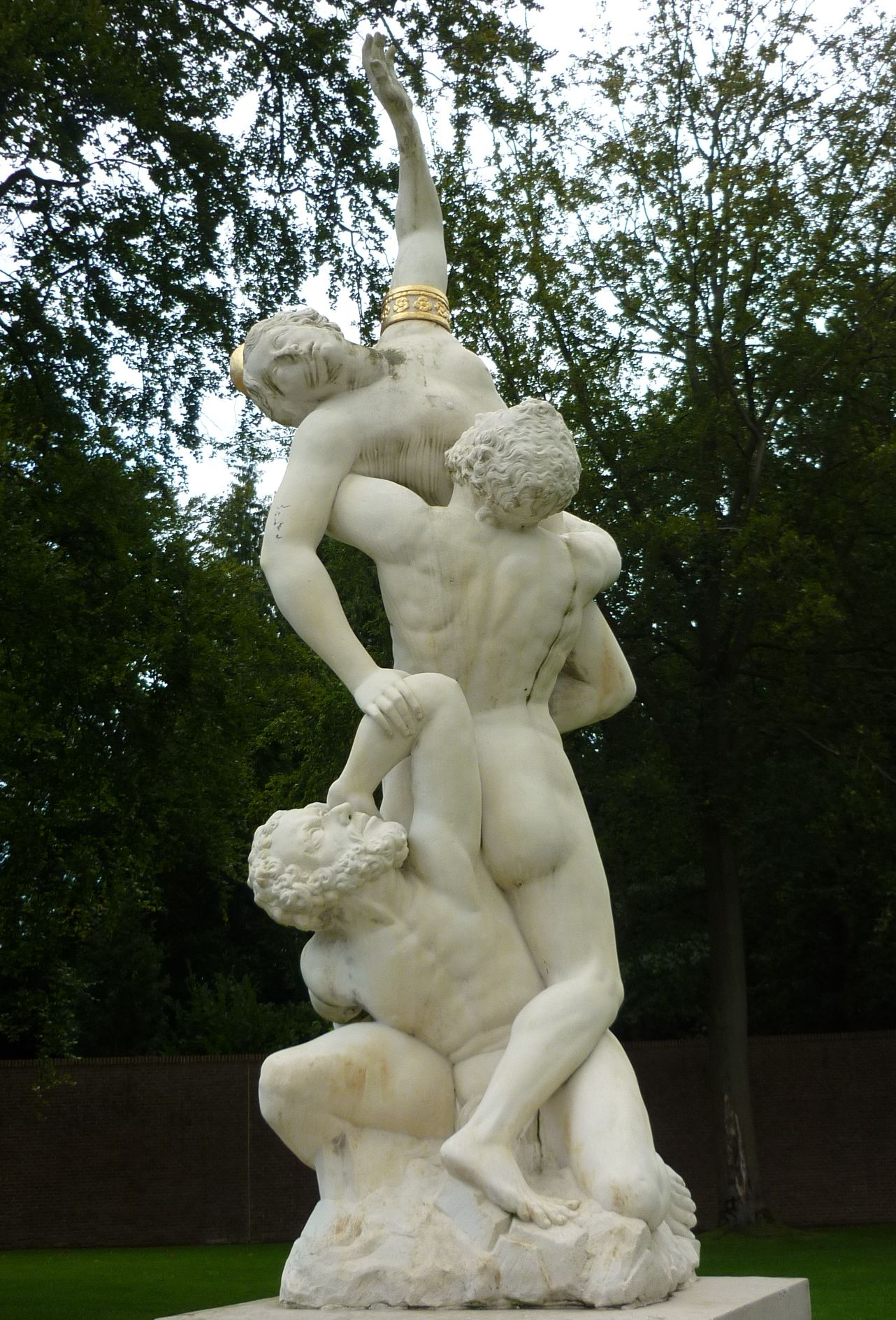
Abduction of a Sabine woman

Albert Xavery, Albert Saverij or Albertus Xavery (Antwerp, baptized on 26 February 1664 - Antwerp, c. 1728) was a Flemish sculptor principally active in Antwerp. He produced mainly statues of mythological figures, some of them on a large scale, made to be displayed in luxurious residences or in gardens. Like other Antwerp sculptors, he exported many of his works to the Dutch Republic, where his patrons included members of the House of Nassau.

== Life ==
Xavery was a son of the Antwerp sculptor Hieronimus Savery (1639–1724) and Anna Tournois. The sculptor Pieter Xavery, who later worked in the Dutch Republic was his uncle. He married Catharina Maria Herry (Herri) in 1687. From this marriage, Jan Baptist and Gerardus Josephus were born. Jan Baptist became a leading sculptor in the Dutch Republic while Jan Baptist became a painter and printmaker. Both brothers worked most of their life in The Hague. Xavery was admitted as a wijnmeester’' (son of a master) in Antwerp's Guild of St Luke in the guild year 1685–1686.

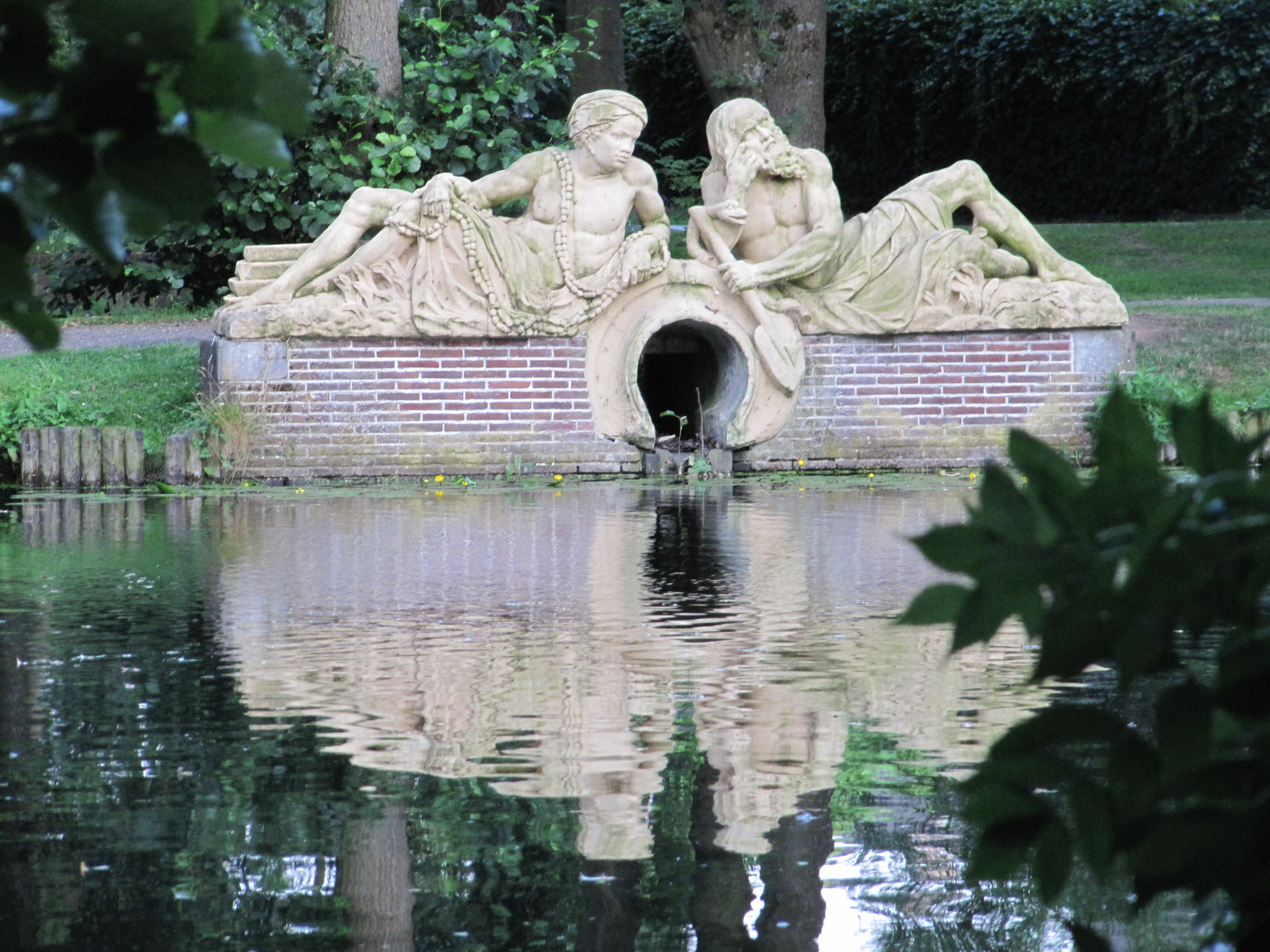
Europe and Africa, Slot Zeist

Contemporary records show that he had close working relationship with other Antwerp sculptors such as Michiel van der Voort the Elder, Alexander van Papenhoven and Jan Claudius de Cock. Alexander van Papenhoven and Jan Claudius de Cock were among a group of Antwerp sculptors that forged an international career from Antwerp mainly by working on commissions for patrons in the Dutch Republic. The Dutch Republic had few homegrown sculptors of quality and had relied since the middle of the 17th century on Flemish artists to supply its wealthy bourgeoisie and nobility with statues and architectural decorations. This trend started with the Flemish sculptor Artus Quellinus the Elder who from 1650 onwards worked for 15 years on the new city hall in Amsterdam. This building and the many Flemish sculptors who joined Quellinus to work on this project had an important influence on Dutch Baroque sculpture. They include Rombout Verhulst, Jan Claudius de Cock, Pieter Xavery, Bartholomeus Eggers and Francis van Bossuit. Xavery is known to have produced garden statuary for patrons in the Dutch Republic. He also sold to England as some large urns made for Wanstead House.

He taught his son Jan-Baptist as well as Jan Huseel, Guillielmus van den Bosch, Daniel Loos, Pedro Misorte, Theodor Franchis d'Uzaine and Joannes de Wyse. This points to a busy workshop.

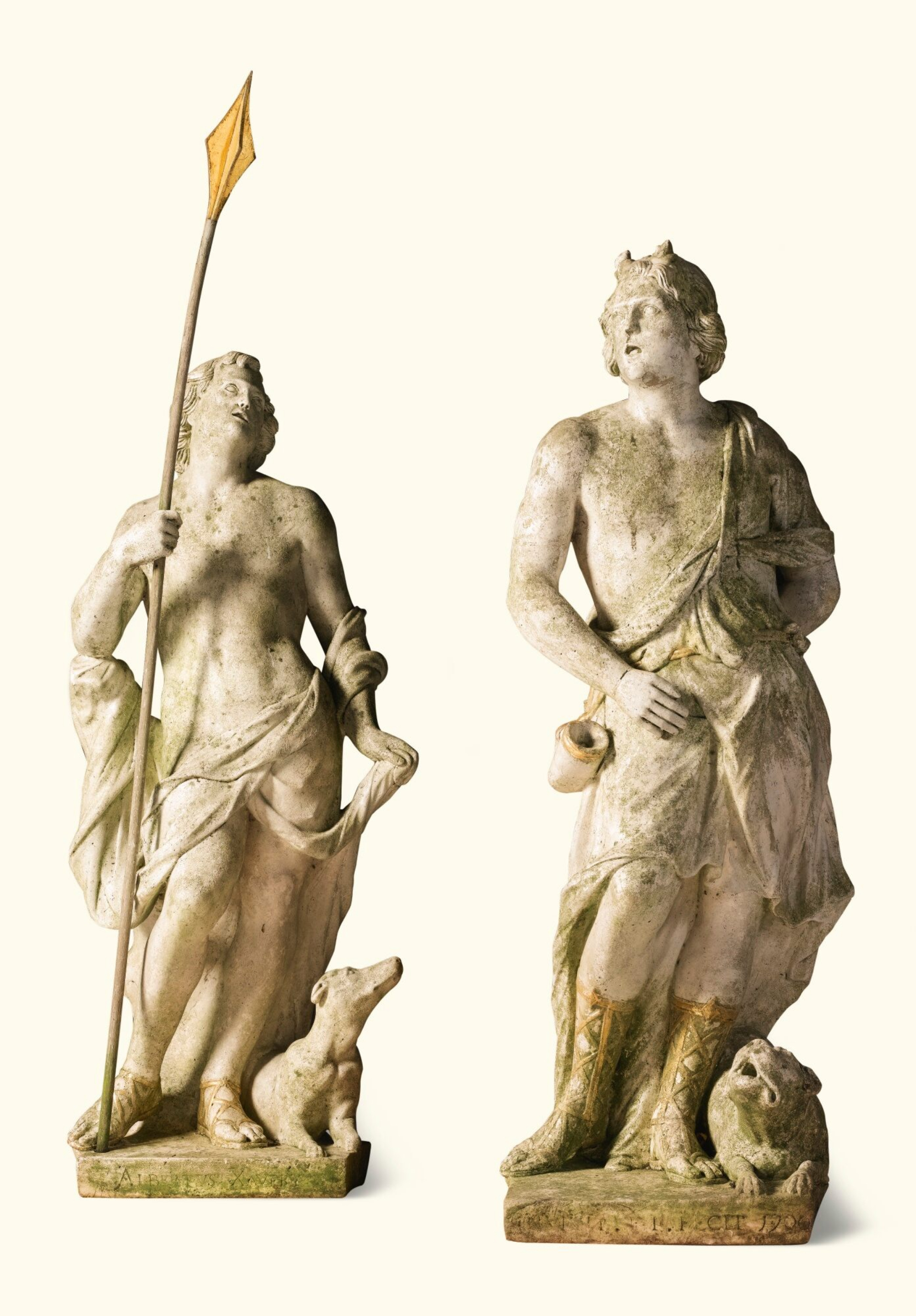
Actaeon and Endymion

It is not clear when or where he died, but it is believed he died in Antwerp around 1728. His son Jan Baptist placed in September 1734 an advertisement for that sale of works by his father and other sculptors active in the Dutch Republic.

== Work ==
Xavery's oeuvre is not well-known. Xavery was a prolific maker of garden ornaments and statues, many of which were exported to the Dutch Republic. Dutch garden art flourished in the first half of the eighteenth century. Such art works were not regarded as independent objects but as part of a larger decorative project fusing greenery and garden ornaments into one harmonious composition, often based on a well-thought-out decorative program or a specific world view.

Xavery made the marble statue of the Abduction of a Sabine woman (1696), which is inspired by the work of the 16th century Flemish sculptor Giambologna (1574–82, Loggia dei Lanzi). The work, signed Albertus Xaveri, has stood in the garden of the Het Loo Palace since 1980. Its original location was the garden of Paleis Noordeinde from which it had been moved in 1974 to Huis ten Bosch in The Hague. At the Bartolotti House on the Herengracht in Amsterdam there are two garden statues attributed to Xavery. After Willem Adriaan van Nassau bought the manor of Zeist in 1677 and had Zeist Castle built, Albert Xavery made two sculpture groups for the garden with allegorical representations of the continents Europe and Africa and Asia and America. The sculpture group Europe and Africa has been preserved and are protected as a national monument, the Asia and America group no longer exists. His known works typically represent mythological or allegorical figures.
