= Gerrit Braamcamp =

Dutch distiller (1699–1771)

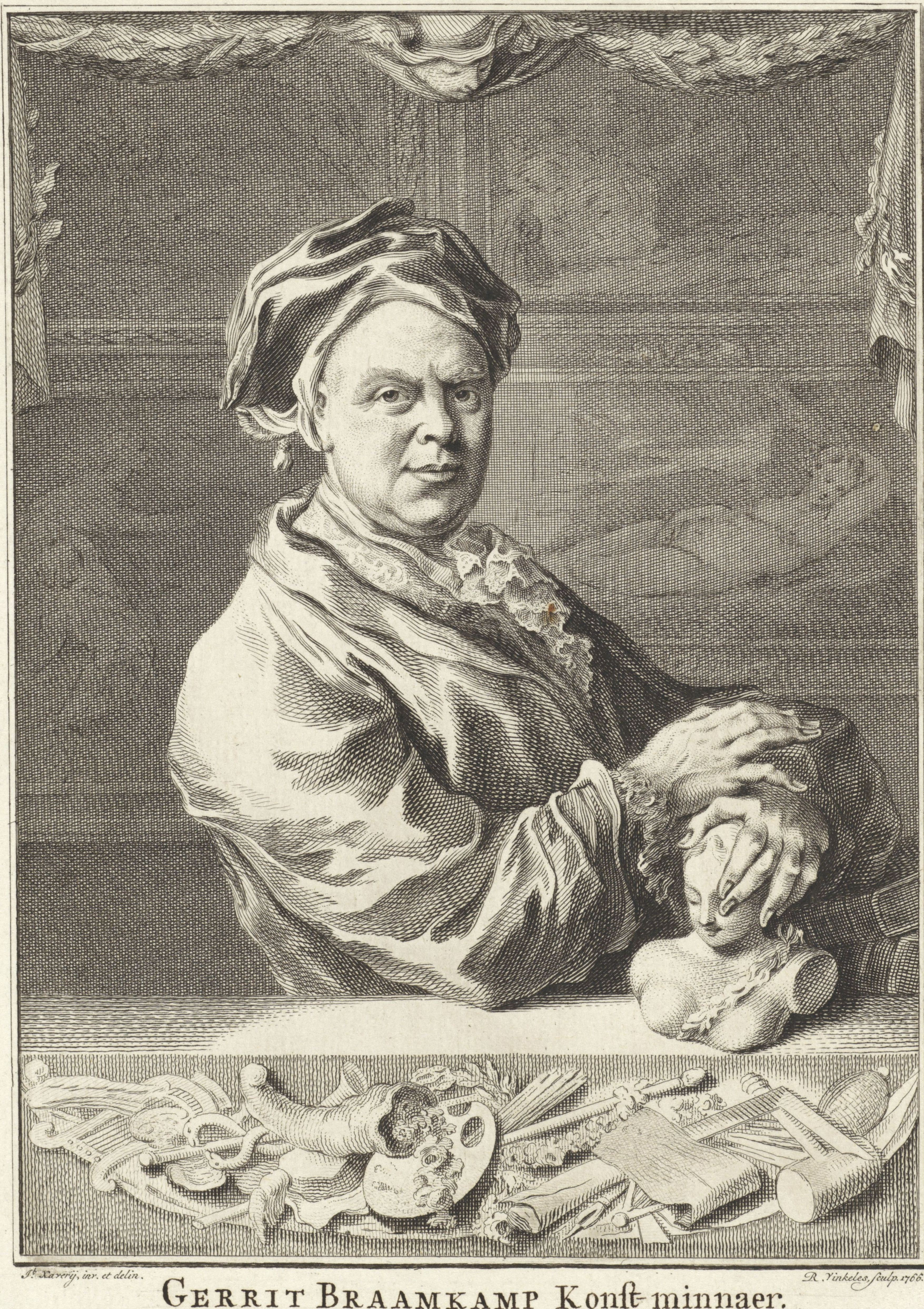
Portrait of Gerrit Braamcamp with items from his collection, 1766 engraving by Jacob Xavery and Reinier Vinkeles

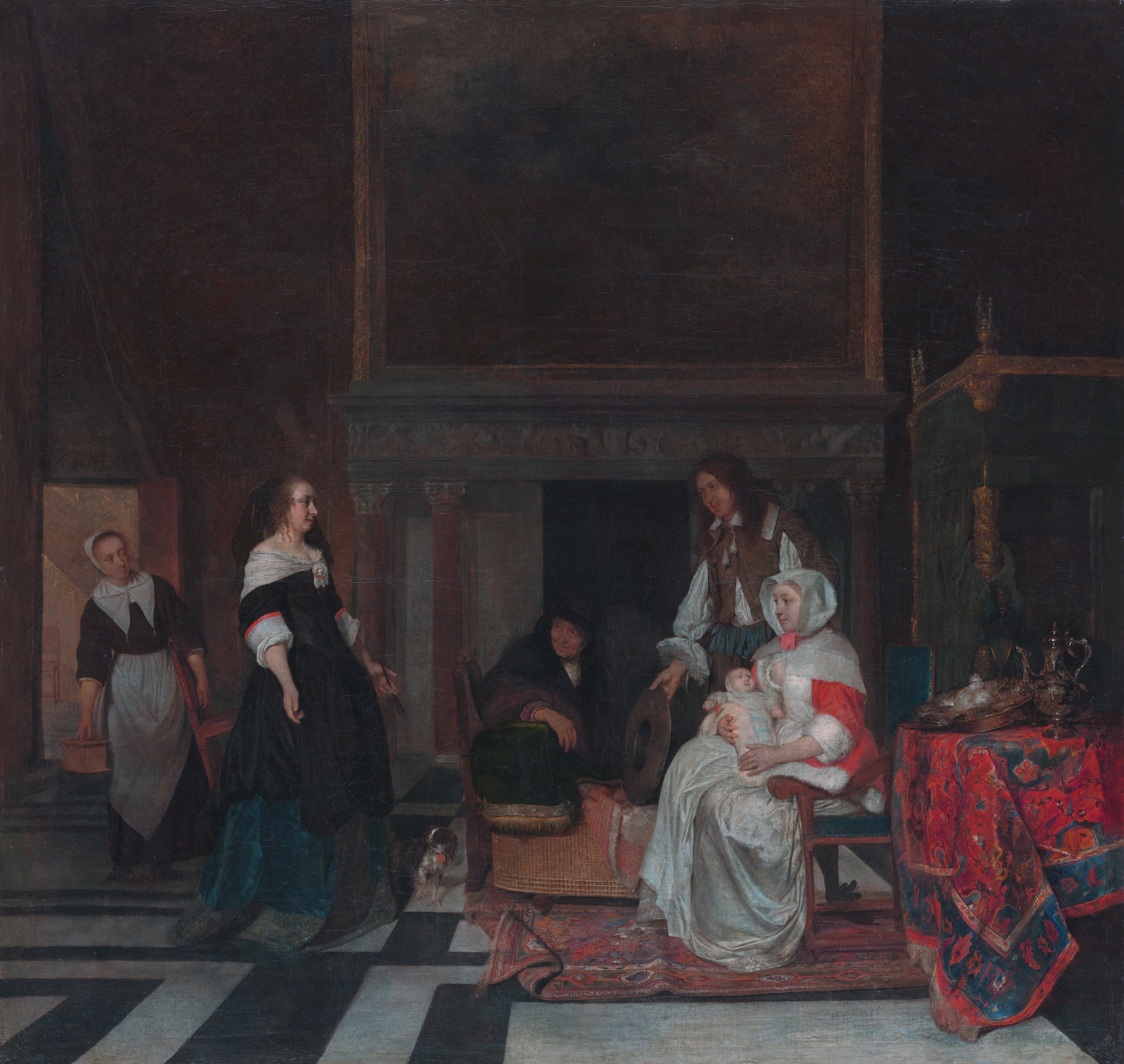
The Visit to the Nursery (1661) by Gabriel Metsu (Metropolitan Museum) - it was bought by Gerrit Braamcamp in 1749.

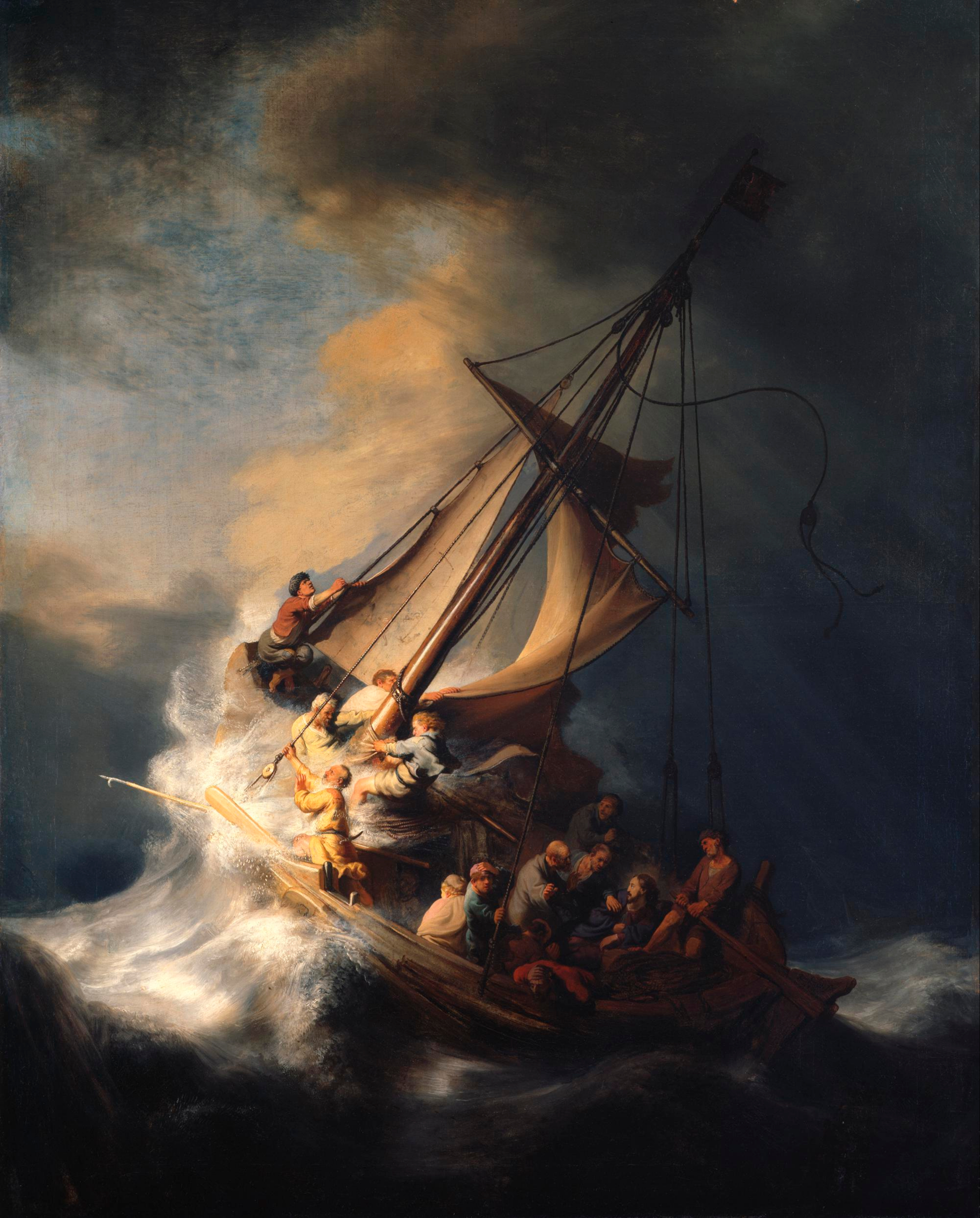
The Storm on the Sea of Galilee by Rembrandt (1633), bought by Braamcamp around 1750. Stolen from Isabella Stewart Gardner Museum, Boston on March 18, 1990

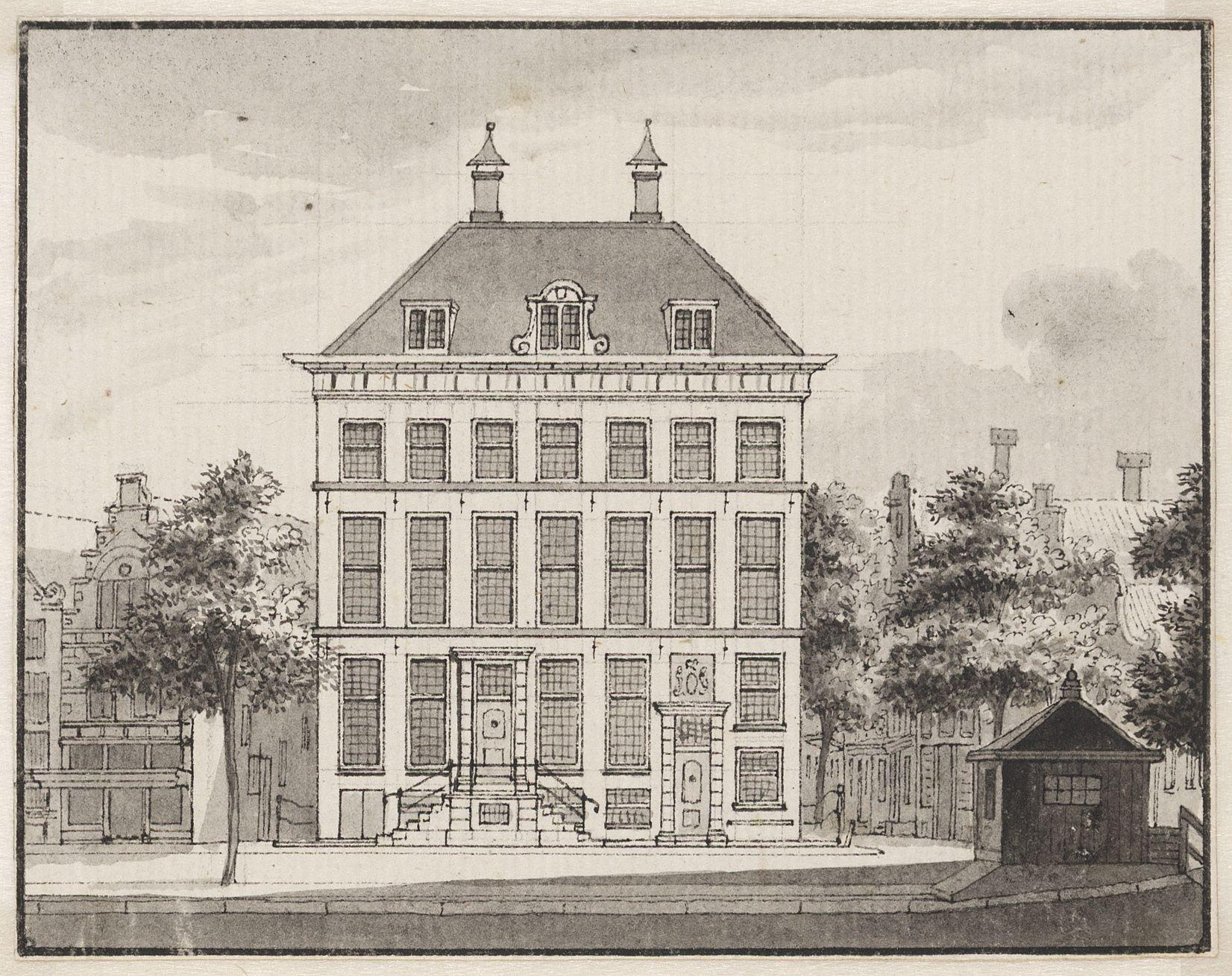
Logement 't Wapen van Amsterdam Kloveniersburgwal 64 by Caspar Philips

Gerrit Braamcamp (18 November 1699, in Amsterdam – 17 June 1771, in Amsterdam) was a successful Roman Catholic distiller, timber merchant, and art collector from the Netherlands. One of the most important merchants in Amsterdam, he built a timber yard and shipyard at one end of Hoogte Kadijk, opposite the Dutch East India Company's own shipyard.

Over thirty years he created a major collection of Dutch and Flemish art, totally around 380 works, though only a few of these are now in Dutch museums. He owned no fewer than ten works by Metsu. He was friends with the poet Jan Baptista Wellekens and the painters Jacob de Wit, Cornelis Troost, Jan ten Compe, Jacob Xavery and Georges-François Blondel (son of Jacques-François Blondel).

== Life ==
Braamcamp 's family originated in Rijssen. In 1699 his father Jan (1671-1713) married the widow Hendriena van Beeck (-1721) in a 'schuilkerk' in Amsterdam - she lived on the N.Z. Achterburgwal, now called the Spuistraat, where Gerrit also grew up. When his mother died, Gerrit took on responsibility for his two brothers' education. At the time of his marriage to an ironmonger's daughter in 1727 he lived on the Herengracht The couple had two children who died in infancy.

== Works ==
- Musaeum Braamcampianum, ofte Korte beschryvinge van het uitmuntend cabinet schilderyen, teekeningen, prenten, beelden, enz., nagelaten by wyl. den heere Gerret Braamcamp : hetwelk verkogt is in Amsterdam op den 31 July 1771. en volgende dagen in ’t logement Het Wapen van Amsterdam : benevens de pryzen en naamen der respect. koopers, ..
- Catalogus van het overheerlyke wydvermaarde en alombekende kabinet van ... Japansche porcelynen, ... neevens de gantsche collecte van ... Japansch verlakt werk, ... mitsgaders een groote party ... zilverwerk .... Alles ... by een versameld ... by wylen den heere Gerret Braamcamp. : Alle het welke verkogt zal werden op dingsdag den 6 augustus 1771. en volgende dagen ...
