= Moses Elects Seventy Elders =

1737 painting by Jacob de Wit

Moses elects the Council of Seventy Elders
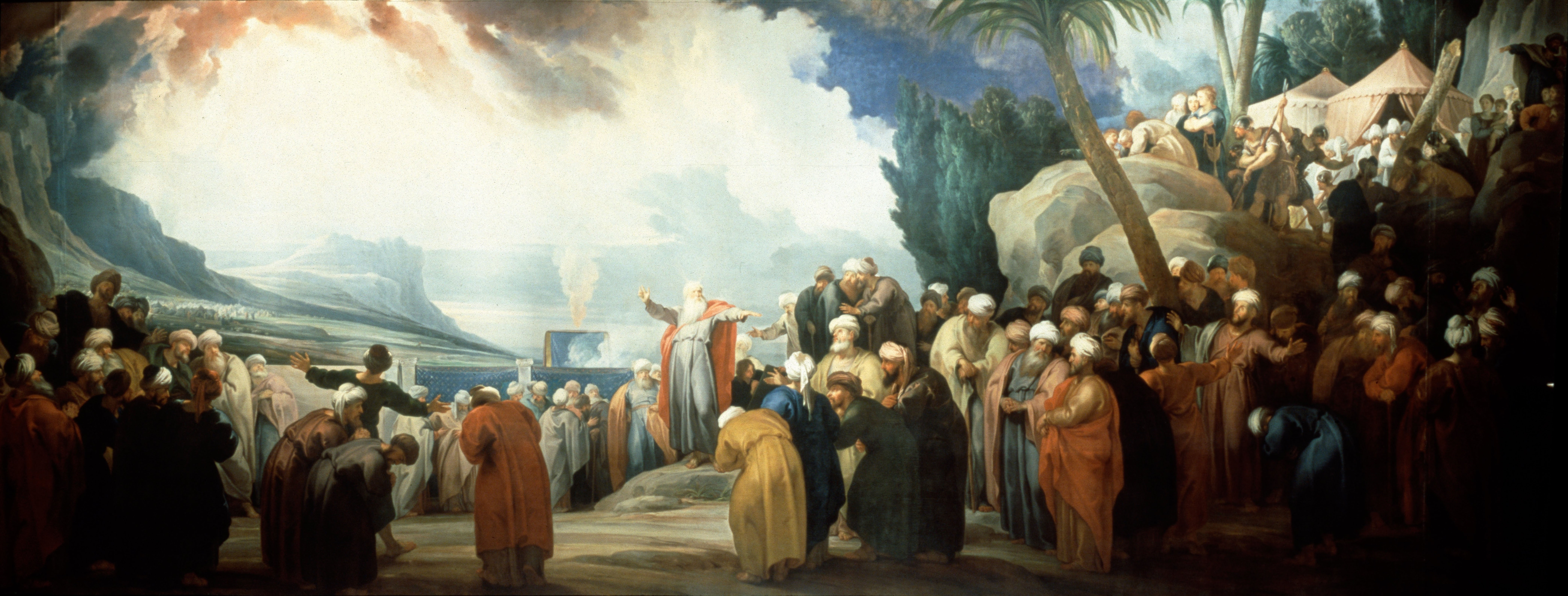
- Year: 1737
- Dimensions: 5.940 m (19.49 ft) × 13.710 m (44.98 ft)

Moses Elects Seventy Elders is a painting by Jacob de Wit, completed in December 1737 and commissioned for the interior of the City Hall in Amsterdam. It shows Moses electing seventy elders (Numbers 11:16–17, 24–25) and is now in the Royal Palace of Amsterdam. It is one of thirteen paintings by the artist on Hebrew Bible themes.

== Sources ==
- https://www.rijksmuseum.nl/en/collection/SK-A-1783
