= The Hague City Hall =

Building in The Hague, Netherlands

Coordinates: 52°4′39″N 4°19′1″E

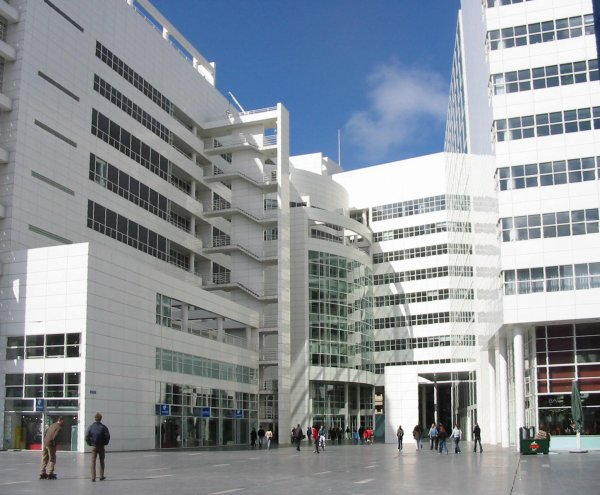
The Hague City Hall

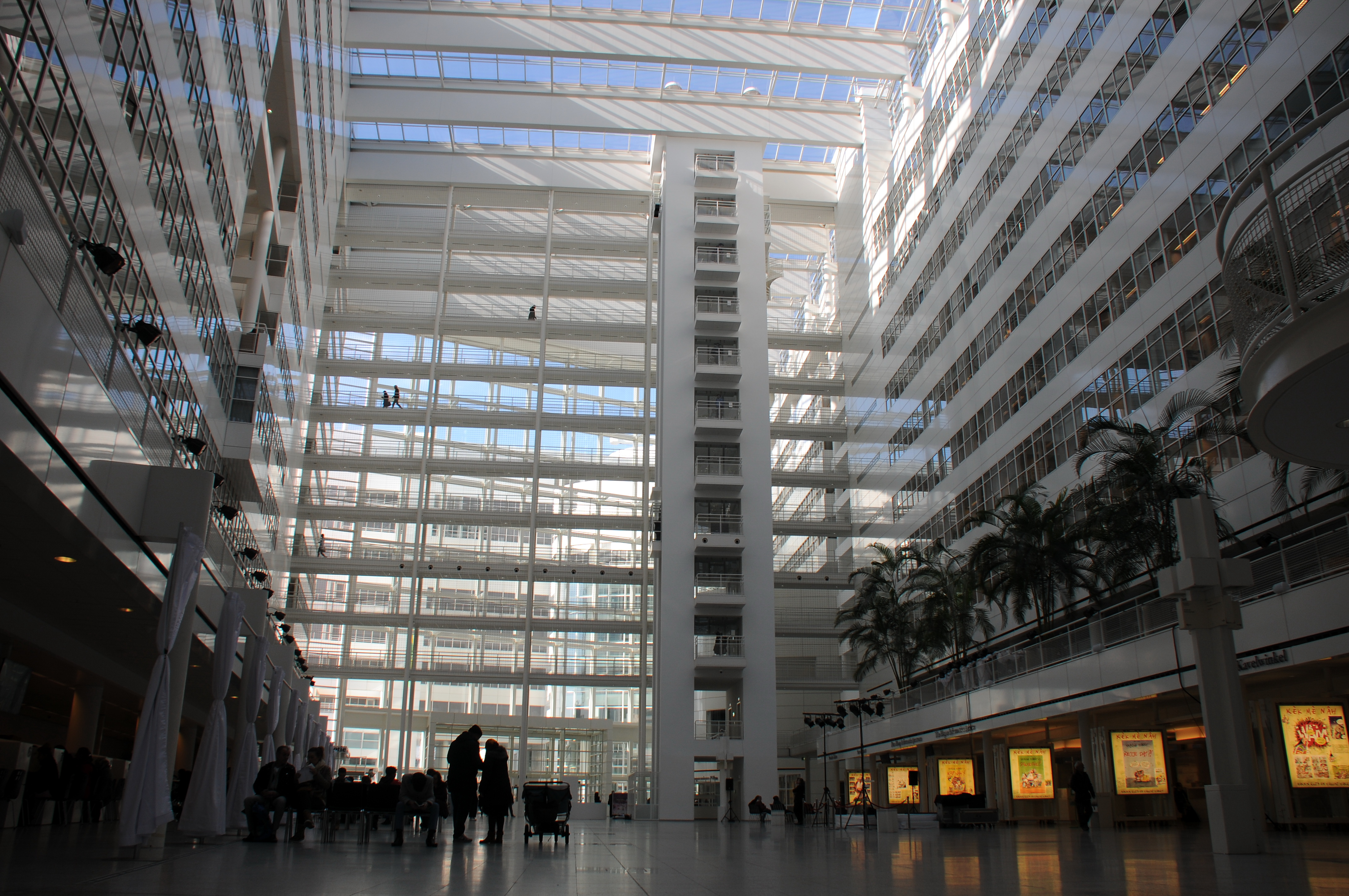
Atrium

The Hague City Hall (Dutch: Stadhuis van Den Haag) is the city hall of The Hague, Netherlands.

== History ==
The city hall was designed in 1986 by the American architect Richard Meier and completed in 1995.

== Architecture ==
It is located in the new city centre, and incorporates the council chamber, the main public library, as well as cafés, exhibition spaces, and a wedding room. At its centre is a large atrium, flanked by two large slab buildings, 10 and 12 storeys tall. The library is located at the northwestern end of the building complex in a semicircular building.

It is nicknamed "the Ice Palace" (Dutch: IJspaleis) for its white color.

== In media ==
In the 2004 American film Ocean's Twelve directed by Steven Soderbergh, it serves as the headquarters of Europol.

== See also ==
- Old City Hall (The Hague)
- San Jose City Hall, another city hall by Meier
