= Jan Punt =

18th-century painter

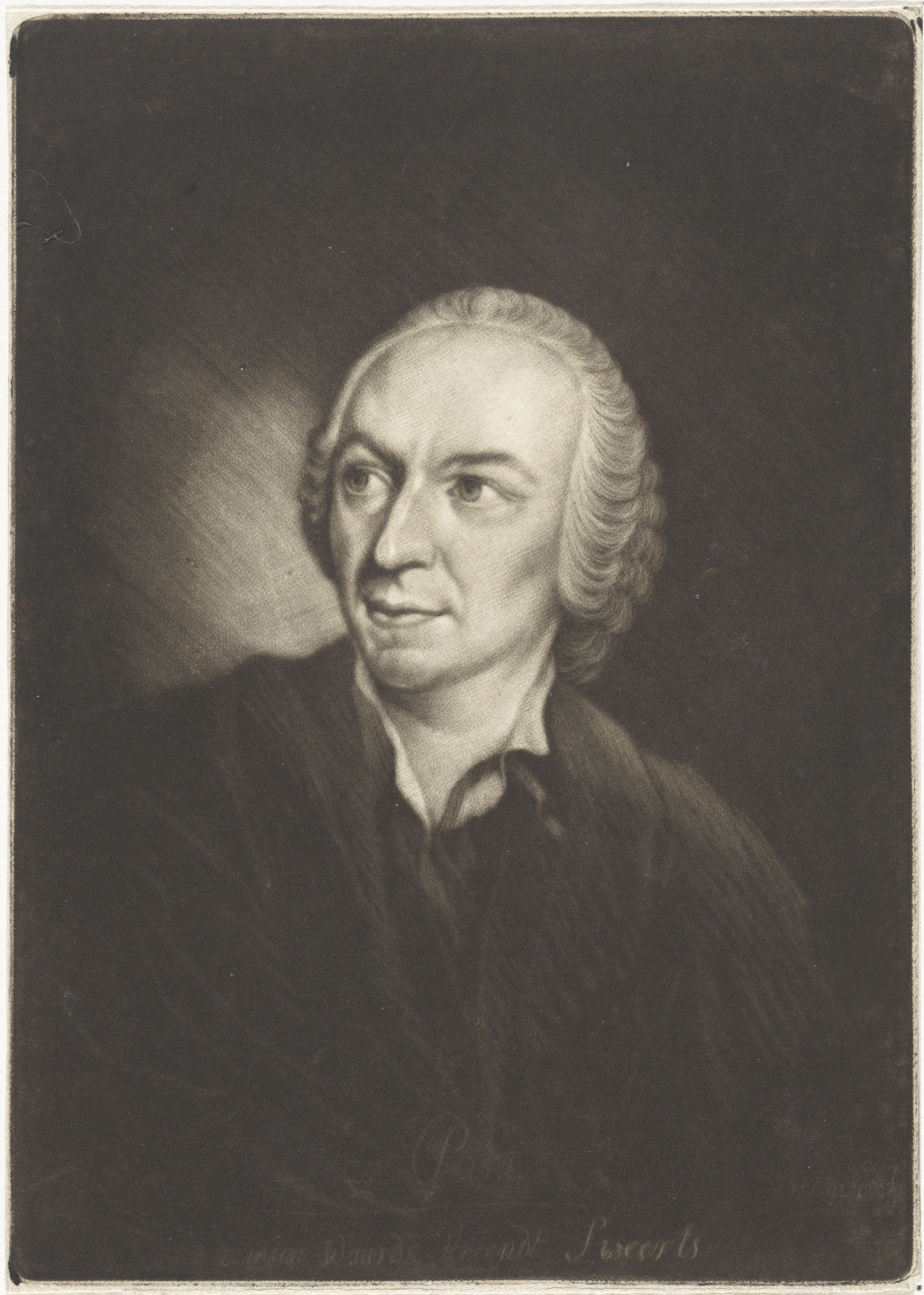
Portrait in mezzotint of Jan Punt by John Greenwood

Jan Punt (1711–1779) was an 18th-century painter from the Dutch Republic.

== Biography ==
He was born in Amsterdam and became a pupil of Jacob de Wit and A. van der Laan. He engraved book illustrations, bibles, and historic prints. The Sint-Carolus Borromeuskerk in Antwerp was formerly known for 39 ceiling pieces by Rubens that were lost in a fire when it was struck by lightning on 18 July 1718. Jan de Wit had made sketches of the paintings and Jan Punt engraved them and published these after the fire. His pupils were Cornelis Bogerts, Marten Corver, Jan Evert Grave, Martinus van der Jagt, Pieter Langendijk (II), and Reinier Vinkeles. He died in Amsterdam.
