= Jacob Xavery =

Dutch painter

Jacob Xavery (27 April 1736 – after 1771) was a Dutch painter.

Xavery was born in The Hague. He was the son of sculptor Jan Baptist Xavery and pupil of Jakob de Wit. He practised in Amsterdam, Breda, and The Hague, and also spent time in Paris. He occasionally imitated the manner of Nicolaes Berchem in his landscapes and had a similar style to that of his master, Jakob de Wit, in his feigned bas reliefs. Xavery also painted portraits of several distinguished persons, among them Gerrit Braamcamp and sculptor Charles Cressent. He died towards the end of the 18th century. His Vase of Fruit and a Vine Branch is displayed in South Kensington Museum.

His brother Frans and his uncle Gerard Joseph were also painters.
