= Jan Baptist Xavery =

Flemish sculptor

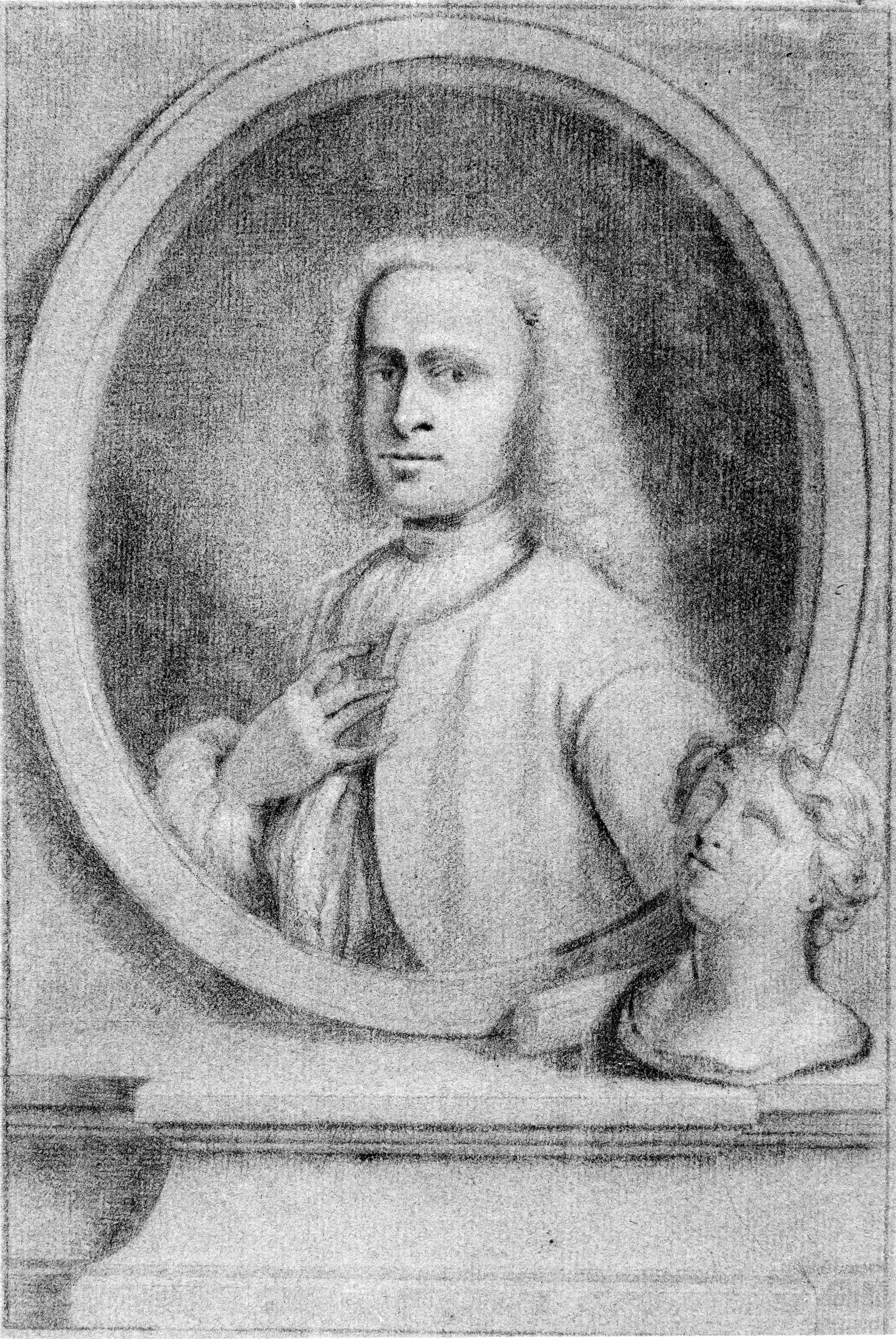
Portrait by anonymous, c. 1742

Jan Baptist Xavery (30 March 1697, in Antwerp – 19 July 1742, in Antwerp) was a Flemish sculptor principally active in the Dutch Republic. He produced portrait busts, large scale statues for residences and gardens, church furniture, wall decorations, tomb monuments as well as small scale statuettes in boxwood, lime wood, ivory and terracotta. The latter were made for elite collectors who liked to admire such objects in the privacy of their homes. He worked on various projects for William IV of Orange-Nassau, the Prince of Orange who later became the Stadtholder. He is regarded as the leading sculptor active in the Dutch Republic in the first half if the 18th century.

== Life ==
He was the son of the sculptor Albert Xavery and Catharina Maria Herry (Herri). He had a younger brother called Gerardus Josephus who became a painter. His father probably taught him before he entered the studio of Michiel van der Voort the Elder. Van der Voort operated a large workshop in Antwerp which produced Baroque church furniture for the principal churches in Flanders. He stayed in the van der Voort workshop until moving to Vienna in 1719.

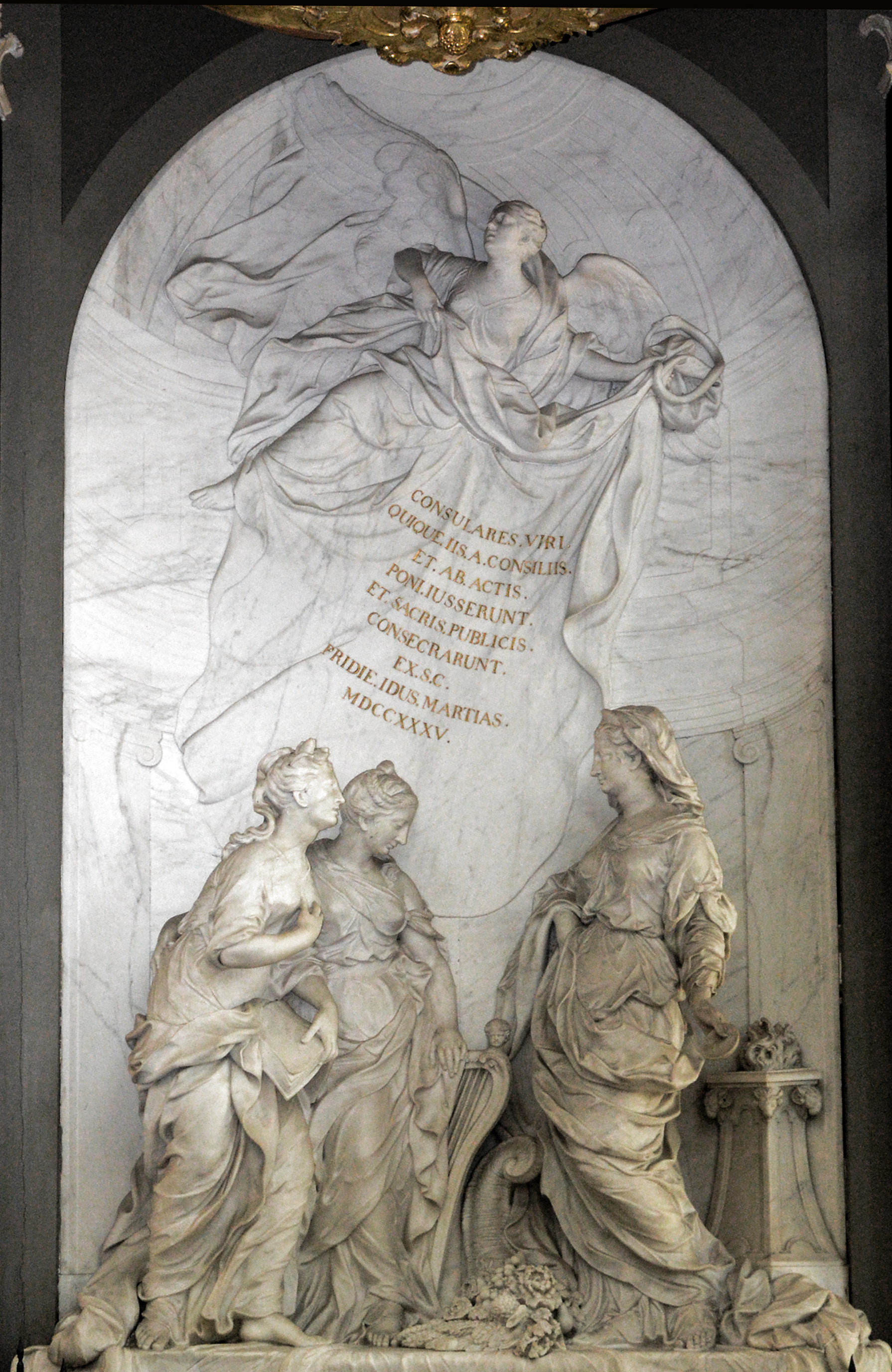
Allegories of Music and Poetry St. Bavochurch, Haarlem, 1739

From there he went to Italy where he was in Rome. Instead of returning to his home country he settled in The Hague in the Dutch Republic. He likely arrived in The Hague in 1721 where he is recorded as paying in June 1721 his half master's money as a sculptor to the local artists' guild, the Confrerie Pictura. His decision to settle in this city may have to do with the activities of the French architect Daniel Marot. Marot was at that time leading many construction and decorative projects in The Hague for which he hired many artists from abroad. There were no sculptors of quality in the city which meant Xavery had hardly any competition.

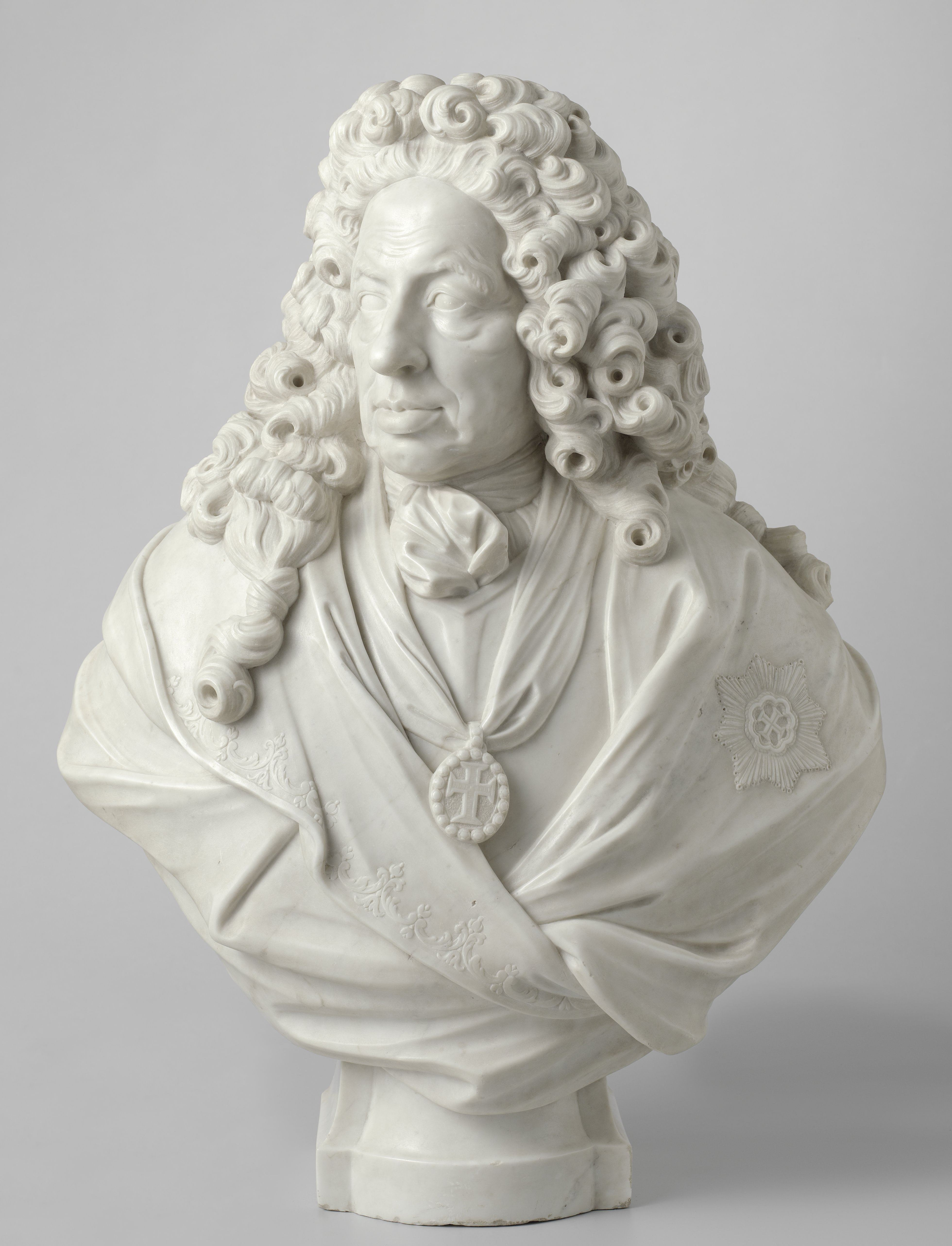
Portrait of Don Luis da Cunha

In 1725 he obtained the citizenship of The Hague and married Maria Christina Robart, a daughter of the goldsmith Claude Robart. The couple had three daughters and three sons. His sons Frans and Jacob would go on to become painters. His three daughters were reportedly all painters but their work is not known. In November 1725 he became a full member of the Confrerie Pictura in The Hague.

From 1725 the first known works he created in the Dutch Republic can be identified. His studio was located in his home on the Zuidoost Buitensingel. In initially he created garden statues, an activity he would continue throughout his career. In 1633, he was one of the artists who worked under the direction of Daniel Marot on the refurbishment of Huis ten Bosch, the residence in The Hague of William IV of Orange-Nassau, the Prince of Orange who later became the Stadtholder. In that project he was responsible, among other things, for the wood carvings in the White Dining Room. He would later also create chimney pieces. One of these, representing Apollo and the Cumaean Sibyl was later removed by the French occupiers and later moved to the Trippenhuis in Amsterdam. He also interceded on behalf of Jacob de Wit for a commission to paint a chimney piece, the frame for which was carved by Xavery. Xavery made marble busts for Prince William IV of Orange-Nassau in 1733 and for the Prince's wife Princess Anne of Hanover in 1736 (Mauritshuis, The Hague). Although he clearly worked on various commissions for the Prince of Orange, no documents which show that he was officially appointed in the service of the Prince have been traced to date.

In addition, he was able to obtain commissions from the civil authorities. He was involved in the decoration of the Old City Hall of The Hague for which he created allegorical figures of Prudentia and Justitia. In the same city hall he made the marble overdoor pieces of the alderman's and justice rooms. He was also active as a dealer in garden statues created by other artists. In 1739 he obtained the commission for a chimney piece for the residence in Leiden of Diederik Baron van Leyden, the regent of Leiden.

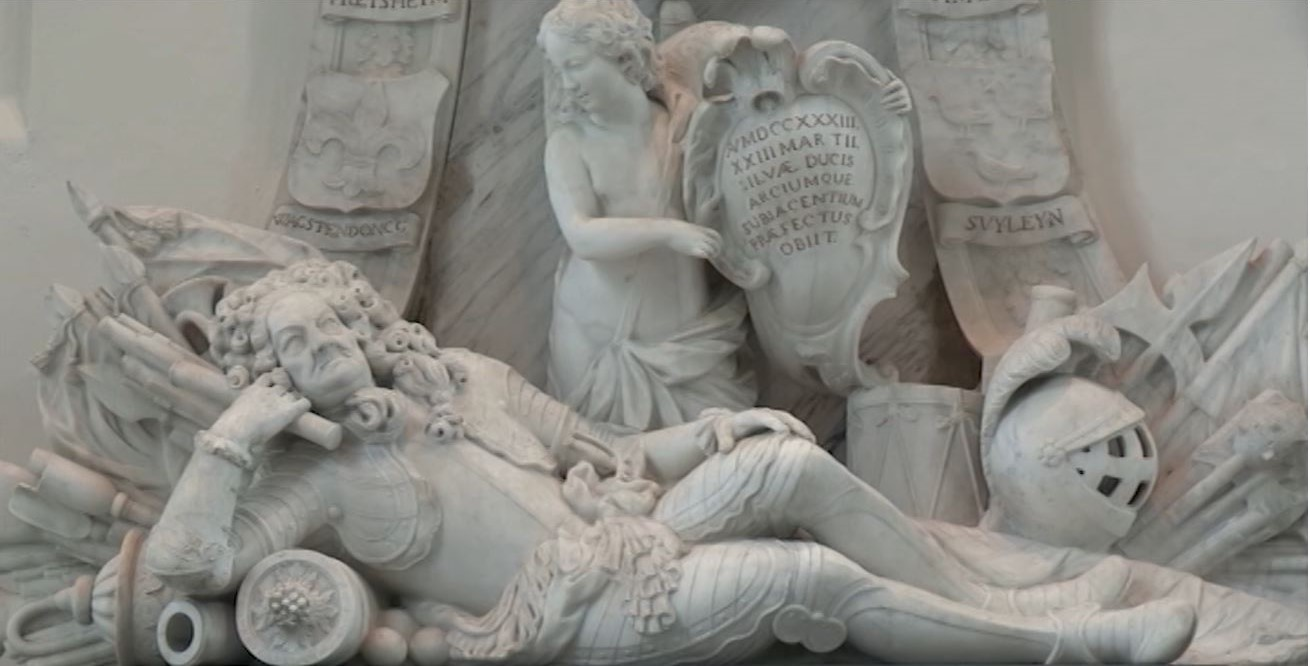
Funeral monument of Johan Theodoor Baron von Friesheim

There is some evidence, too, that he worked briefly around 1737 for Frederick I, Landgrave of Hesse-Kassel.

In 1641 and 1642, Xavery was paid for various works he had made for Breda Castle, owned by the Stadhholder family. One of the works was a statue of Mars, that stood on the ridge of the stairs in the courtyard of the castle. He reportedly injured himself while placing this statue of Mars and not long after on 19 July 1742 he died in his native city of Antwerp where he was staying with family. His widow continued the business after his death and the workshop is known to have produced throne chairs into the 1750s.

The sculptor Pieter Xavery who worked in Leiden was his great-uncle. His brother Gerard Joseph was an etcher and painter who was also active in the Dutch Republic. Willem Hendrik van der Wall and Olof Arenius were his pupils.

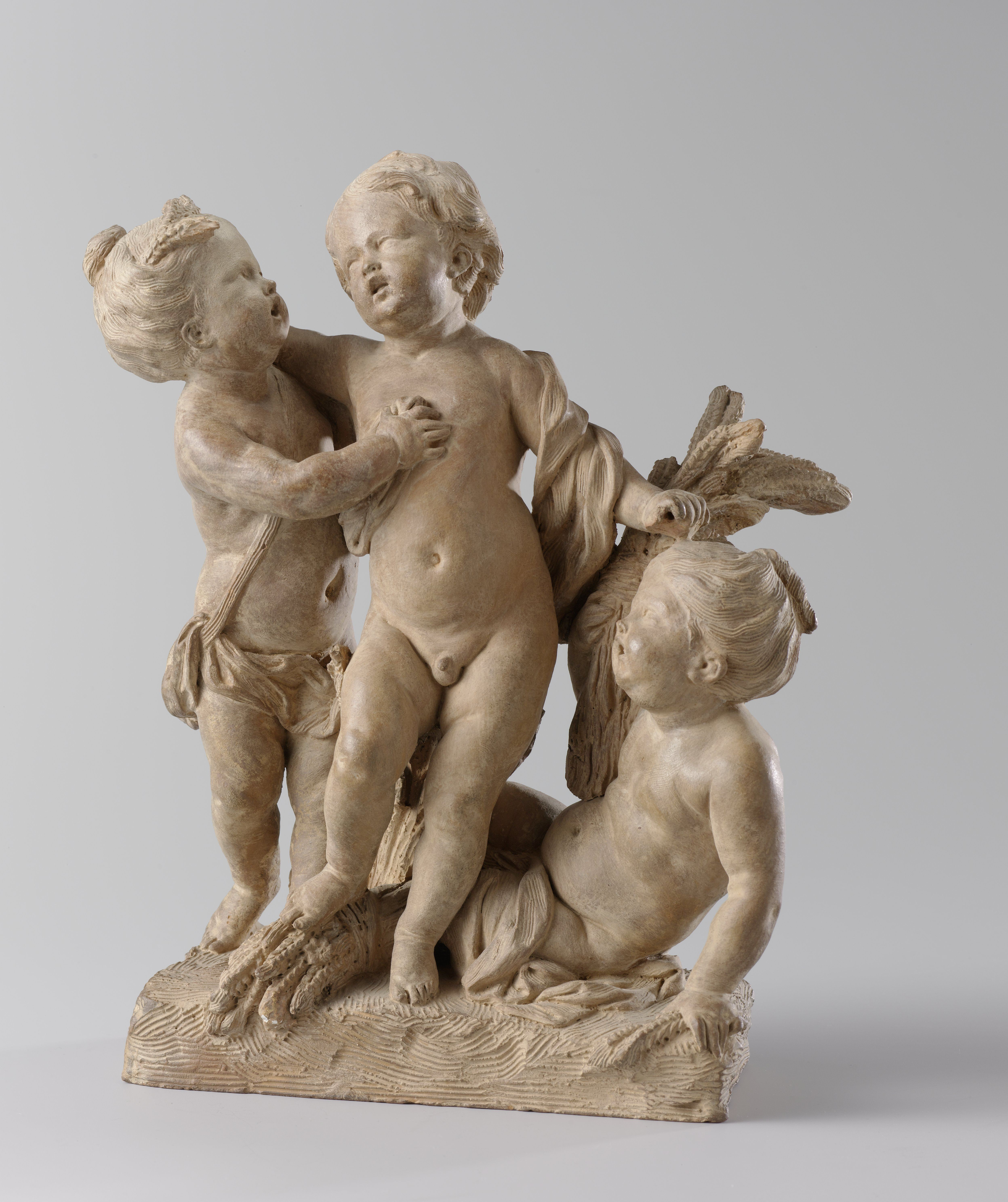
Group of three children, allegory of Summer

He was well connected with the literary and artistic circles of his time and his friends included Lambert ten Kate, Hubert Poot, Jacob de Wit, Balthasar Denner and Olof Arenius. When he died poets Jacob Spex and Dirk Smits wrote elegies for him. The Flemish sculptor Johannes Franciscus Maes was a collaborator in his workshop and would continue to work in the Dutch Republic after his death.

== Work ==
Xavery was a versatile artist who worked in marble, terracotta, ivory and sandstone. He portrait busts, large scale statues for residences and gardens, tomb monuments as well as small scale statuettes typically of mythological figures and putti and medallions.

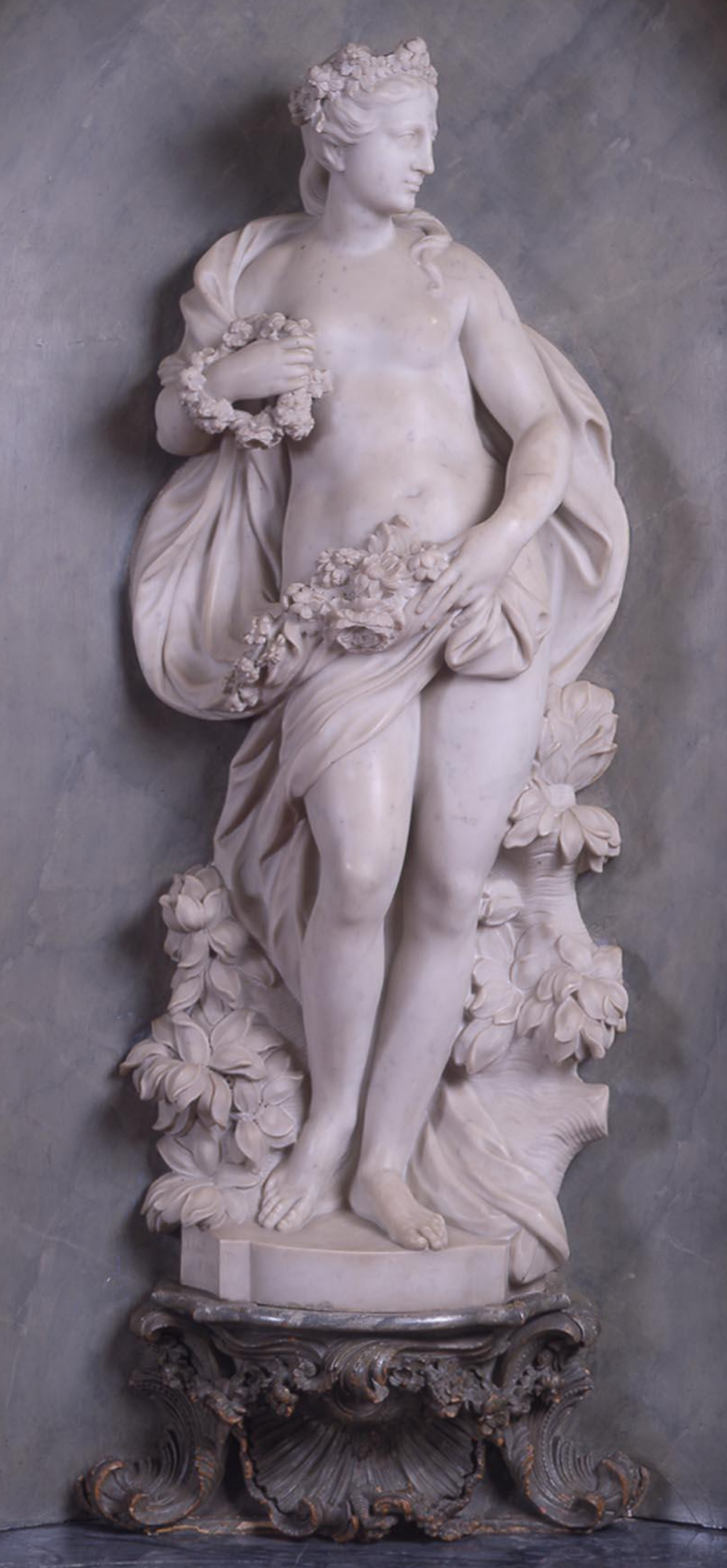
Flora

While working early in his career on projects of Daniel Marot, his style shows similarities with that of Marot. Even in his early career he showed an interest in developing his own style as shown in the Group of three children, allegory of Summer of 1726 (Rijksmuseum, Amsterdam). It shows a lively group of two nude girls and a boy children holding symbols of summer (corn stalks, ears of corn, a sickle) who are connected through scanty draperies. The group shows his interest in achieving a lively interaction between the children and a nice distribution of their attributes. His knowledge of the new Rococo style is demonstrated in the decoration of the old The Hague City Hall, in particular in the marble overdoors for the central hall, which are in the form of rocailles, a typical decorative element used in the Rococo style. Executed in 1634, this may be the earliest use of rococo architectural elements in the Dutch Republic. His later style became more elaborate, as is seen in works such as the Allegory of Faith of 1735–9, in the Grote Kerk of Haarlem. His style remained generally closer to Classicism then Rococo, which was likely related to the fact that most of his commissions were made for aristocratic residences or funeral monuments.

Various reliefs by Xavery have been preserved. The marble relief with an allegorical representation under the organ of the Grote Kerk in Haarlem is considered one of his best works. He also made many chimney pieces, only a few of which have survived. In the salon of Huis Dedel in The Hague (now Design Museum Dedel) there was a marble chimney piece with two girls' heads that was probably made by Xavery. One of his chimney pieces made for the residence in The Hague of Diederik Baron van Leyden is now in the Rijksmuseum in Amsterdam. He designed the fireplace and the chimney piece, which is a relief representing the mythological lovers Paris and Oenone. Paris is shown engraving the name of his beloved on a tree. There are two drawings by his friend and frequent collaborator Jacob de Wit that probably served as designs or sources of inspiration for the relief. De Wit's artistic influence on Xavery sheds an interesting light on their working relationship in Leiden.

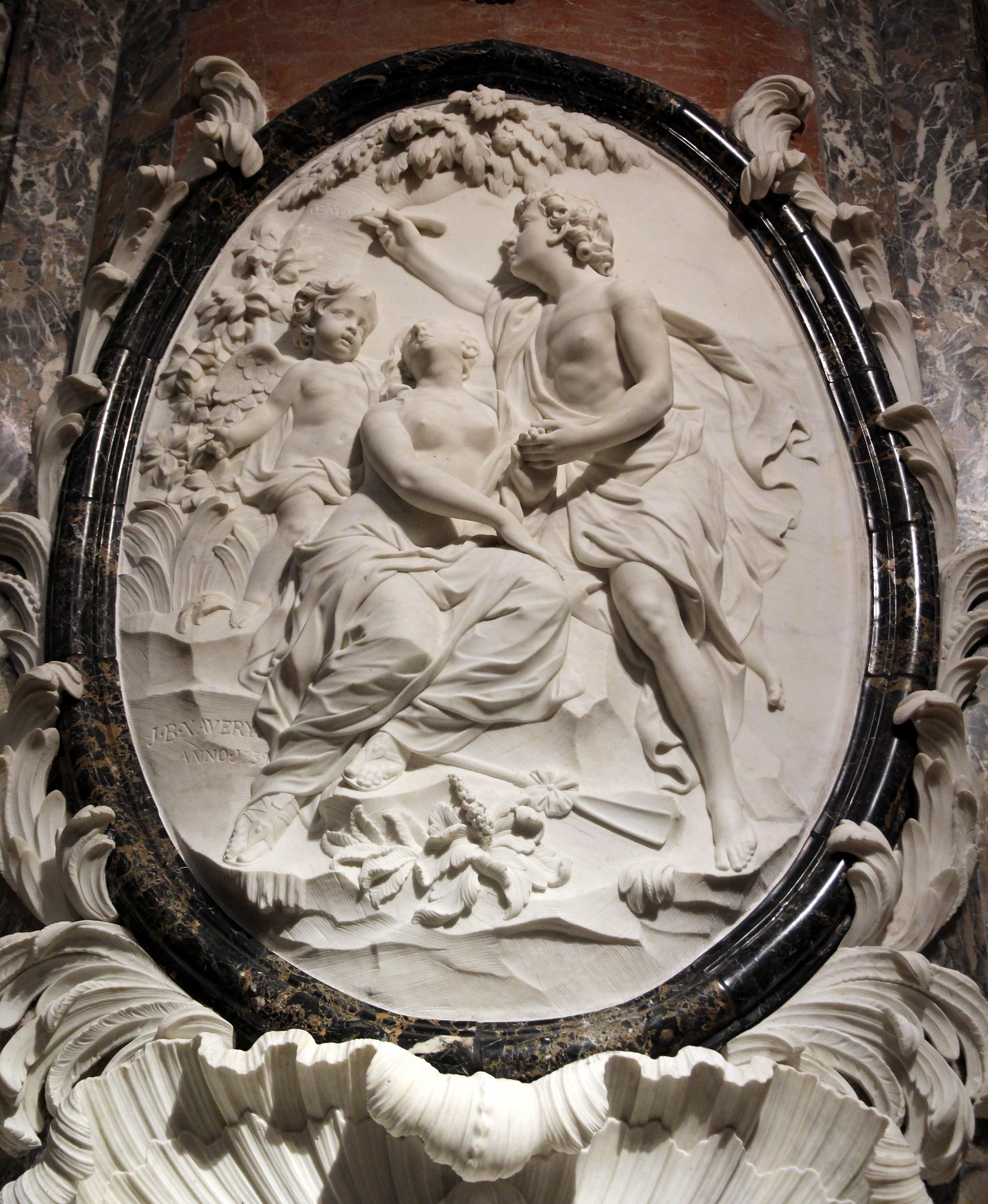
Chimney piece with relief of Paris and Oenone

Xavery was a prolific maker of garden ornaments and statues. Dutch garden art flourished in the first half of the eighteenth century. Such art works were not regarded as independent objects but as part of a larger decorative project fusing greenery and garden ornaments into one harmonious composition often based on a well thought-out decorative programme or a specific world view.

Xavery made several bust portraits. One impressive work is the marble bust of Don Luis da Cunha, ambassador of Portugal (1737, Rijksmuseum). Don Luis da Cunha (1662–1749) was ambassador to the kingdom of Portugal between 1728 and 1736. The bust shows the ambassador as a stately figure wearing a cuirass and cloak. Even though the sitter was already 75 years old at the time of the bust, Xavery gave him a vital face. This was likely the result of the artist not dwelling on the details in the face and clothing of the ambassador. Xavery made bust portraits of other prominent personalities such as William VIII, Landgrave of Hesse-Kassel, Frederick I of Sweden, the Duke of Marlborough and Prince Eugene of Savoy. Xavery also made a portrait bust of François Fagel, an important personality who served as servant of the States General for more than sixty years. His various funeral monuments also include busts or full-length portraits of the deceased persons. These include the funeral monuments of Johannes Graaf von Lilljenstedt (1732) in the Marienkirche in Stralsund, Johan Theodorus baron von Friesheim (1733) in the Grote of Sint-Catharinakerk in Heusden, Sicco van Goslinga (1737) in the Hervormde kerk in Dongjum and Count Oswald III van den Bergh (1741) in the Sint Petrusbasiliek in Boxmeer. Some of the funeral monuments such as that of Reinhart Vincent von Hompesch in Linnich have been lost while of that of Johan van Welderen only the bust portrait has survived.

Xavery was also known for his small-scale ivory sculptures. His ivory Medallion portrait of Maria Louise van Hessen-Kassel, the mother of Prince William IV of Orange, made in 1731 was likely the first contact between the artist and the Prince.

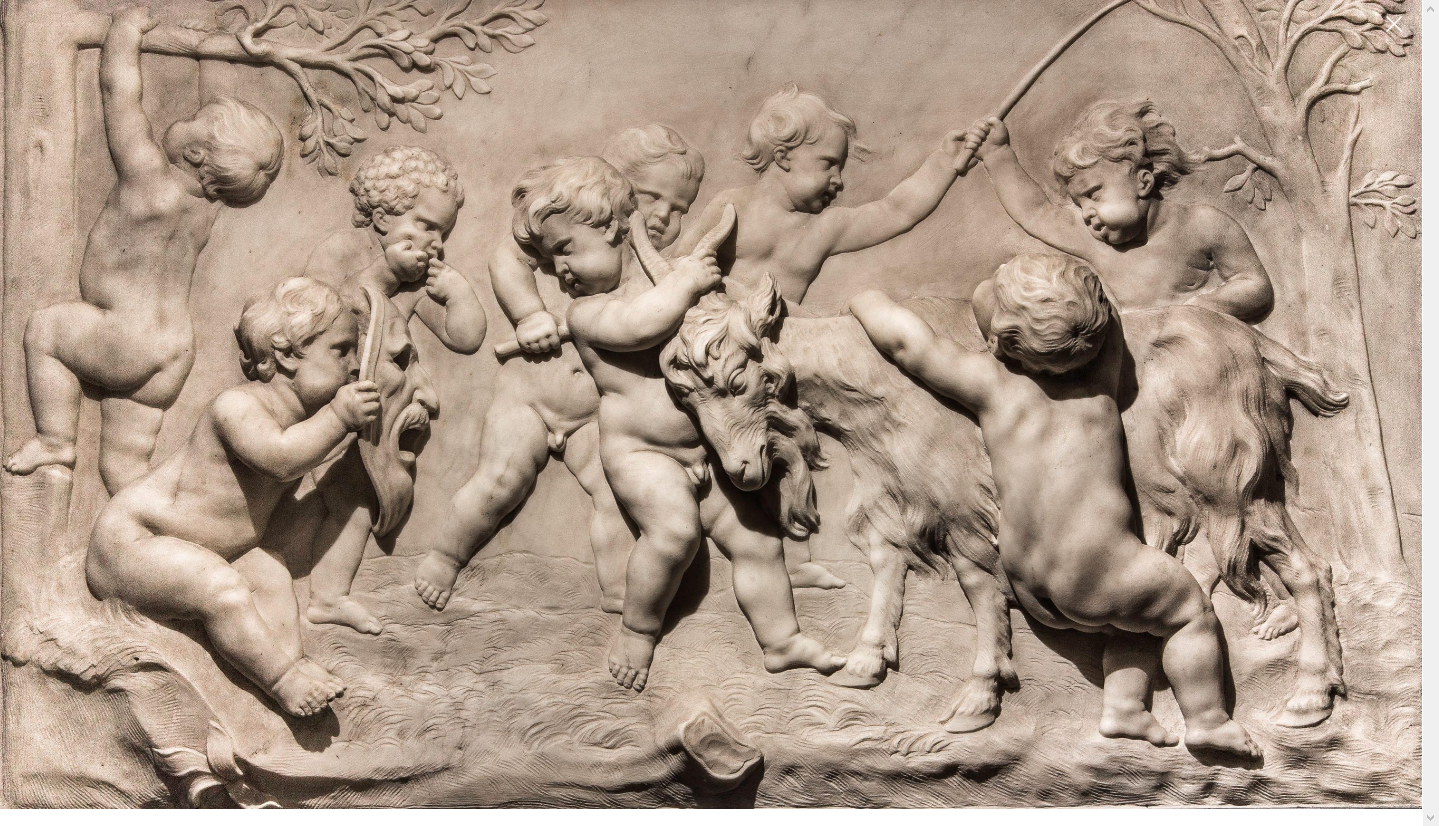
Marble relief with playful putti
