= Gerard Joseph Xavery =

Dutch painter

Gerardus Josephus Xavery (27 July 1700 – after 1747) was a Dutch painter. He was the brother of Jan Baptist Xavery, the sculptor, and uncle to the brothers Frans – later his pupil – and Jakob. He was a native of Antwerp, but settled in Holland and practised at The Hague, becoming a member of the Pictura Society in 1741.
