= Frans Xavery =

Dutch painter (c. 1740 – c. 1788)

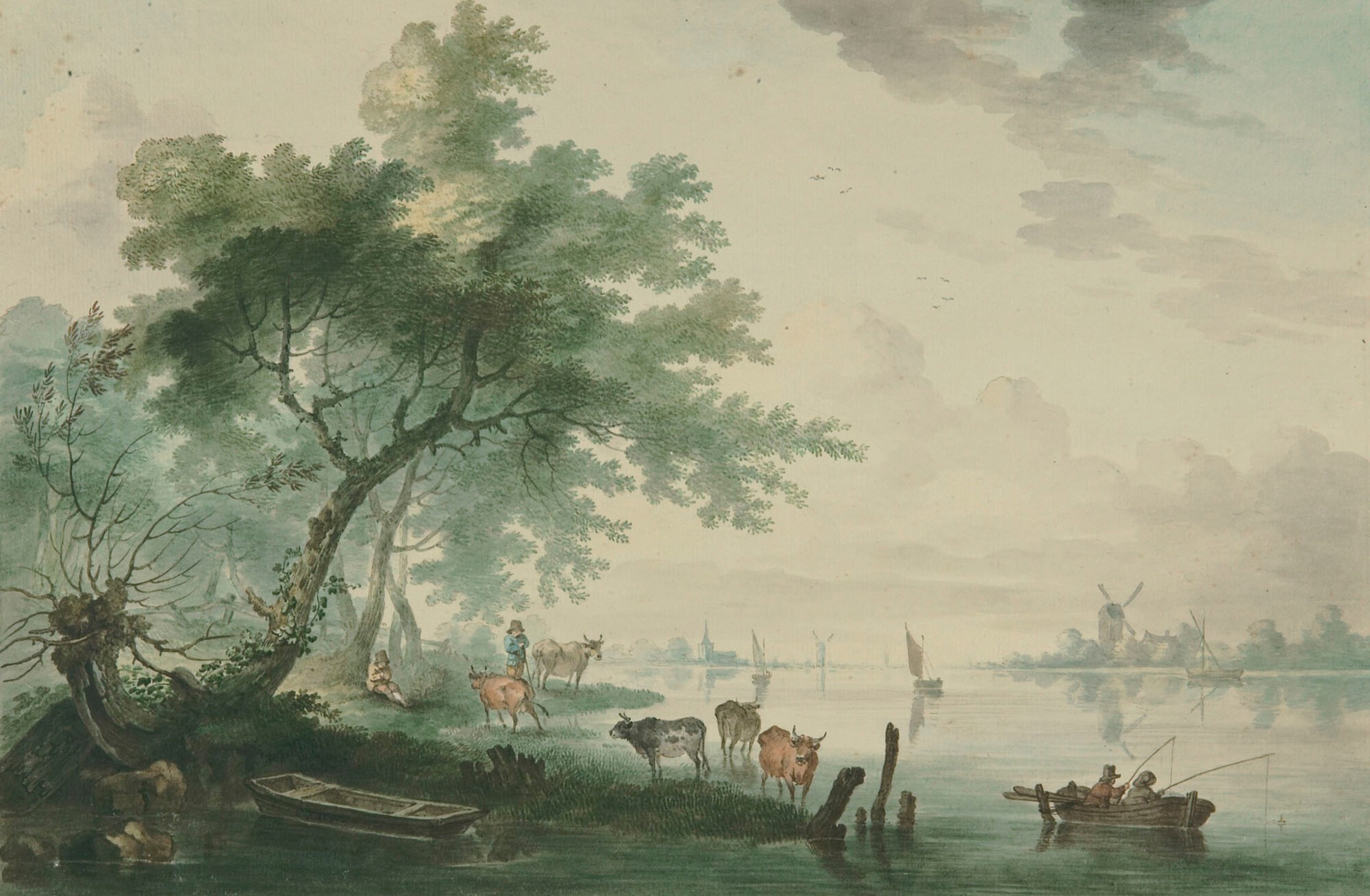
River landscape with cattle and boats, watercolor, before 1772

Franciscus Xaverius (Frans) Xavery (baptized 15 January 1740 – c. 1788) was a Dutch painter and the son of Jan Baptist Xavery. Frans was born in The Hague. He became a member of the Pictura Society at The Hague in 1768, practised for some time in that city, and later in Amsterdam and Rotterdam. He studied first under his uncle Gerard Joseph, and afterwards under Jacob de Wit. His brother Jacob was also a painter. His last known dated painting is one in a series on the castle of Turnhout from 1788.
