= Pieter Xavery =

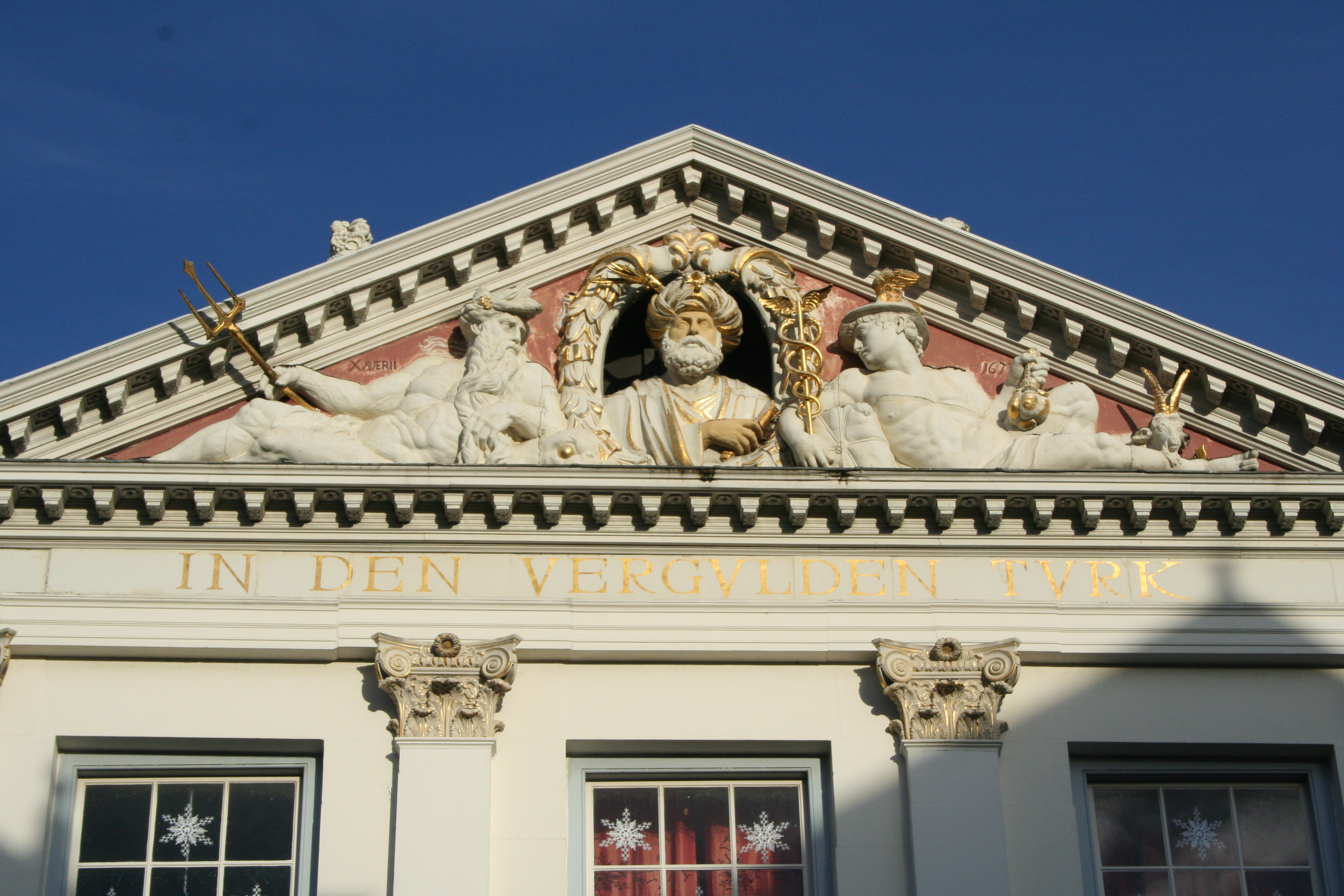
Pediment sculpture of the House In de Vergulde Turk in Leiden, 1673

Pieter Xavery (name variations: Pieter Saverij, Pieter Savoriex, Pieter Xaveri, Pieter Xaverii) (1647 in Antwerp – after 1674 in Antwerp) was a Flemish Baroque sculptor whose principal known works were made during his residence in the Dutch Republic.

== Life ==
The details about his early life and training are scarce. In 1670 he went to Leiden to study mathematics at the university. It is not clear whether he was brought to Leiden by his compatriot Rombout Verhulst or was simply his successor. In Leiden he married Gertrude Bruysscher in 1670. He remained in the city where he continued his career as a sculptor.

Xavery is known to have been active in Leiden until 1674, after which he is said to have returned to Antwerp. There is no record of any works by his hand following his return to Antwerp.

It is believed that Xavery was related to the sculptor Jan Baptist Xavery.

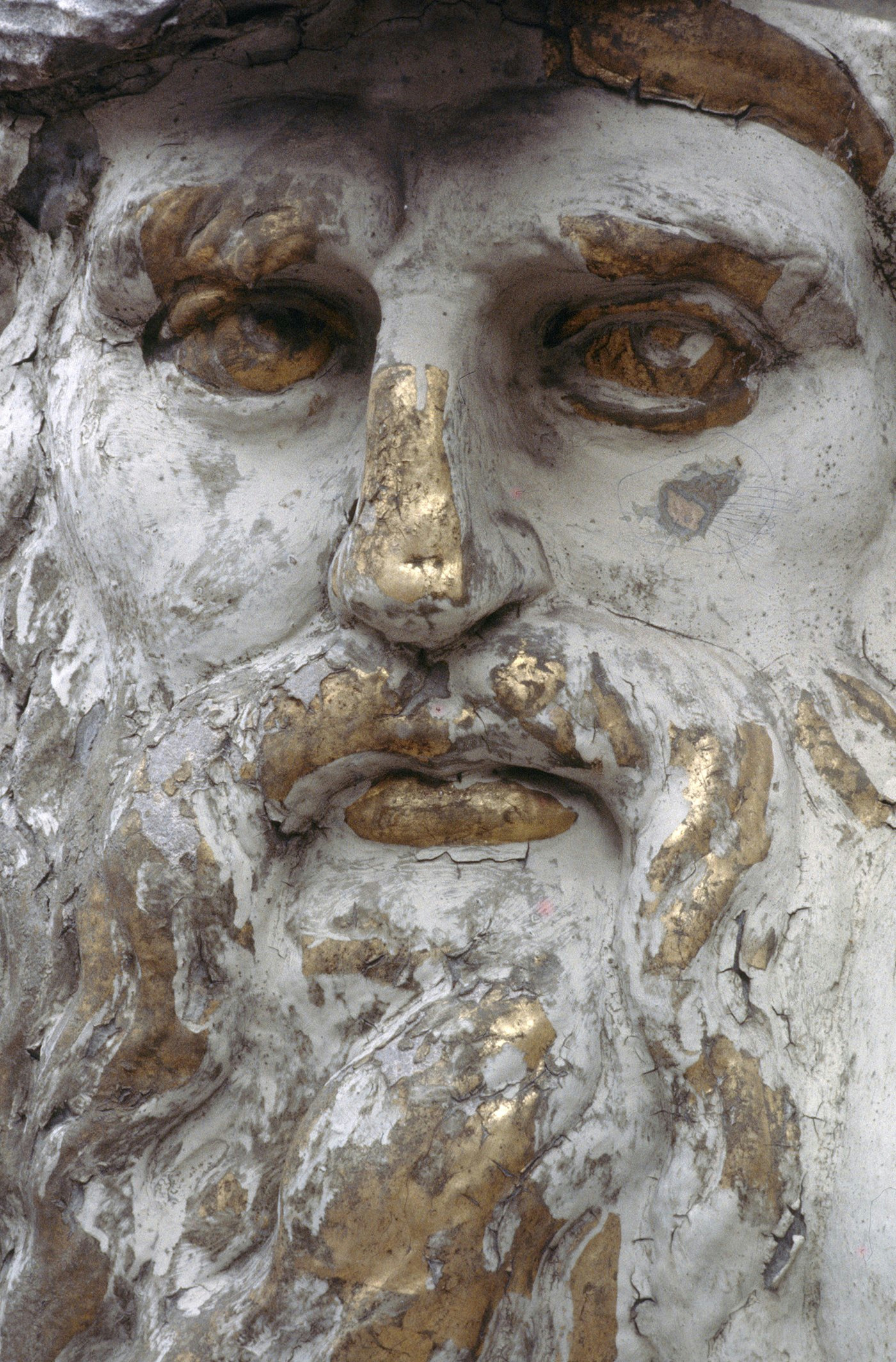
Detail of Neptune, In de Vergulde Turk, Leiden, 1673

== Work ==
His earliest known work is the Flagellation of Christ, a terracotta relief dated 1667, one of the few surviving religious works by his hand. His work tends towards genre and caricature. Many of his works are in terracotta, while a few are in ivory and bronze.

His small-scale works show his talent for picturesque caricature. These terracotta figures with oversize heads and prominent features predate the Rococo style with its preference for exaggeration. This is well demonstrated by the Two madmen in the collection of the Rijksmuseum.

Xavery also executed a number of monumental pieces during his residence in Leiden. Among these were stone decorations for the pediment and gables of the Gravensteen in Leiden. He also produced in Leiden a pediment sculpture for the house "In den vergulden Turk" ("In the Gilded Turk") representing a Turk, Neptune, Mercury and Angora goat (all symbols related to the textile trade for which Leiden was famous) and a collection of twenty-three judges and lawyers for the Vierschaar. All remain in situ. He also made a series of busts of Roman emperors of which the plasters in Leiden are likely copies.

There is a large collection of his work at the Rijksmuseum.
