= Jacob de Wit =

Dutch painter

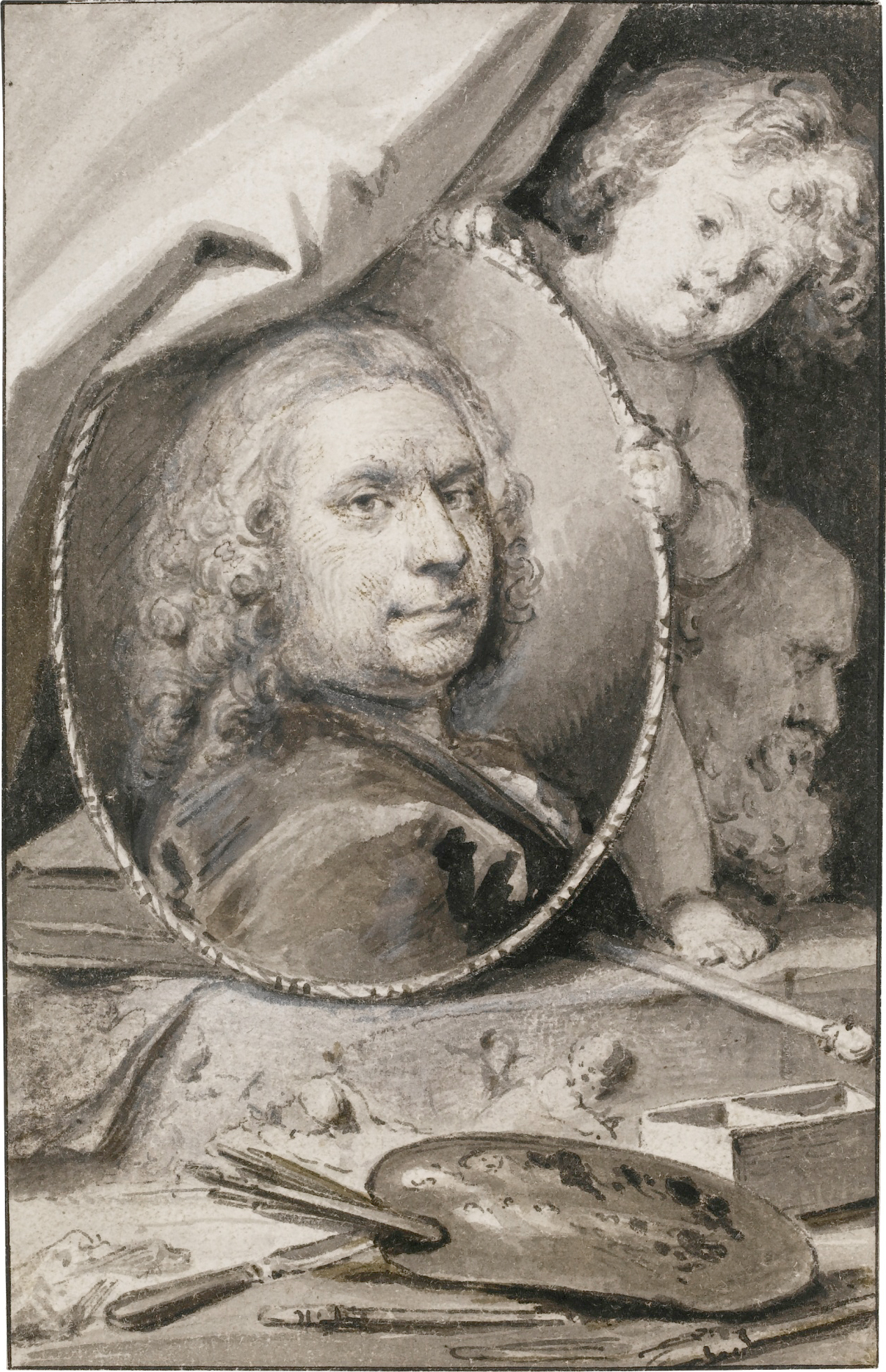
- Born: 19 December 1695; Amsterdam
- Died: 12 November 1754 (aged 58); Amsterdam
- Occupation: Painter, etcher, copper engraver

Signature
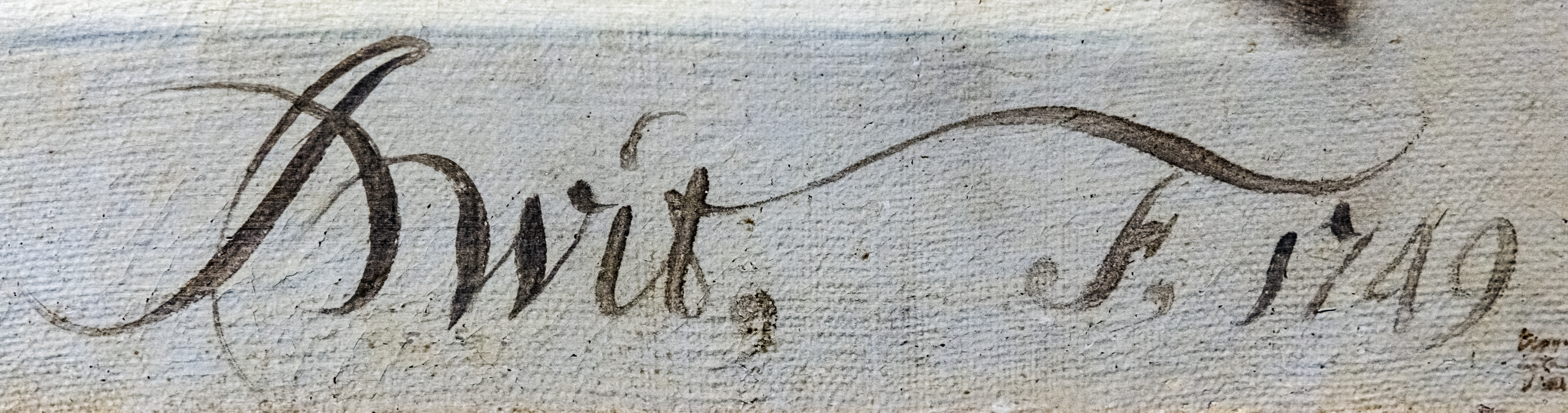

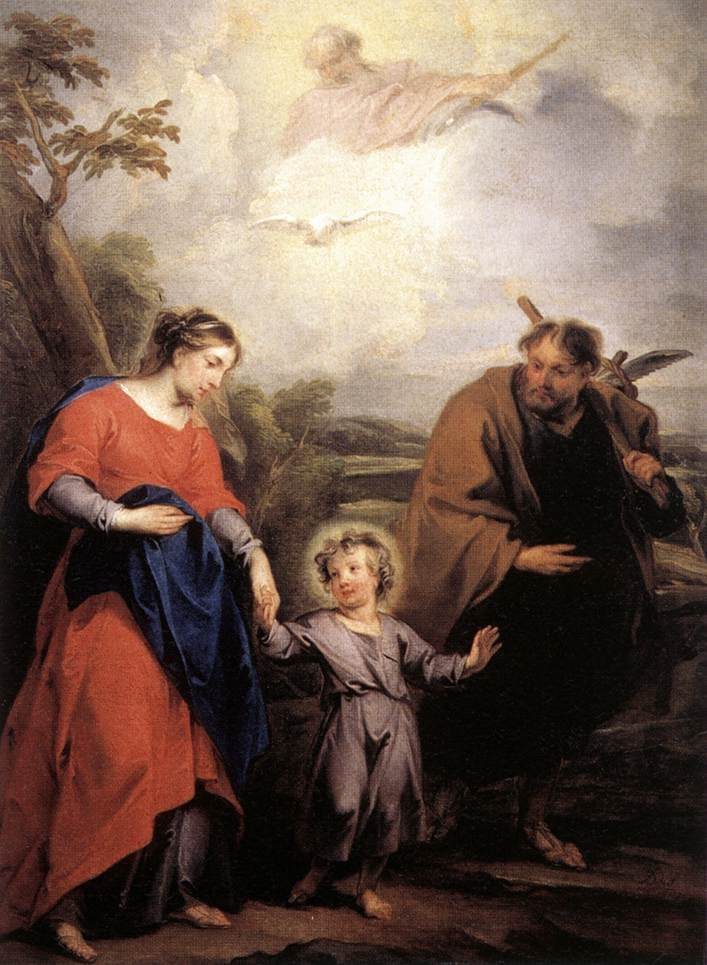
"Holy Family and Trinity" (1726) by Jacob de Wit

Jacob de Wit (19 December 1695 – 12 November 1754) was a Dutch painter and interior decorator. He is best known for his depictions of religious scenes.

== Biography ==
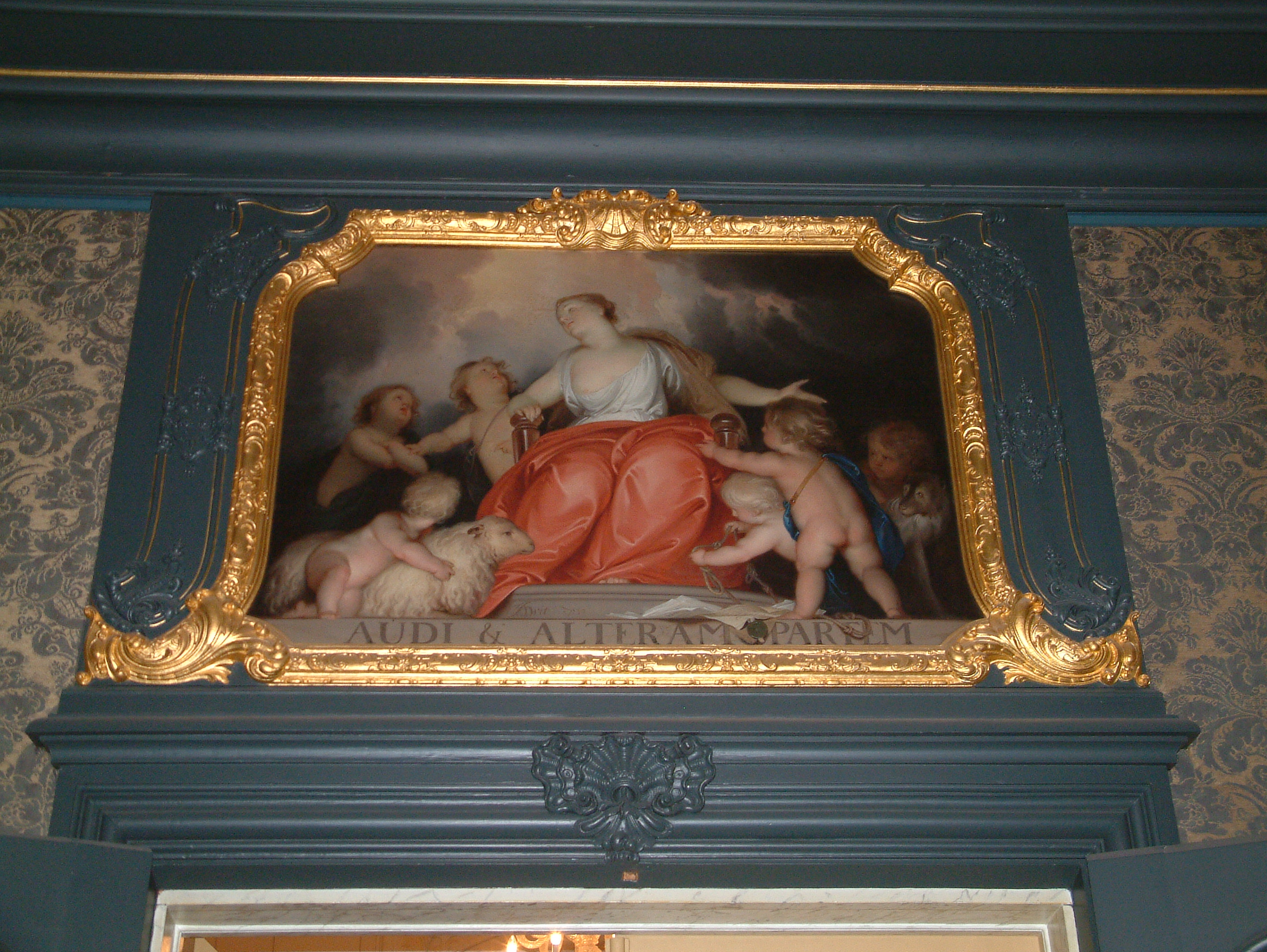
Overdoor in Old City Hall in The Hague, illustrating Audi alteram partem.

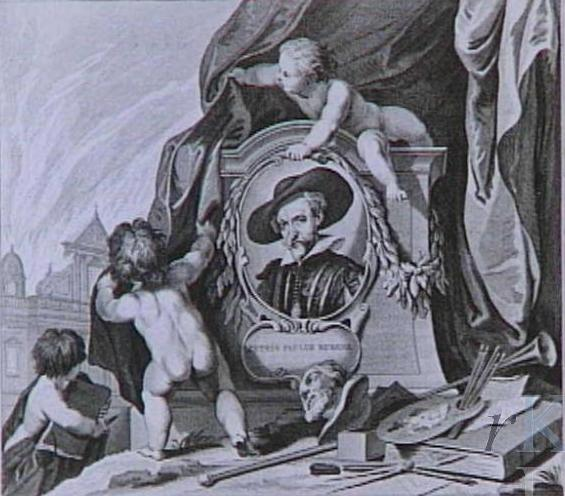
Book of engravings by Jan Punt after Jacob de Wit's sketches of the lost ceiling pieces by Rubens, 1751, collection Teylers Museum

Jacob de Wit was born in Amsterdam, and became famous for his door and ceiling paintings. He lived on the Keizersgracht in Amsterdam, and many of the buildings on the Keizersgracht still have door or ceiling paintings done by him. Since many of the families who lived in Amsterdam in those days had country villas, de Wit also painted in houses in the fashionable areas of Haarlem and the Vecht river.

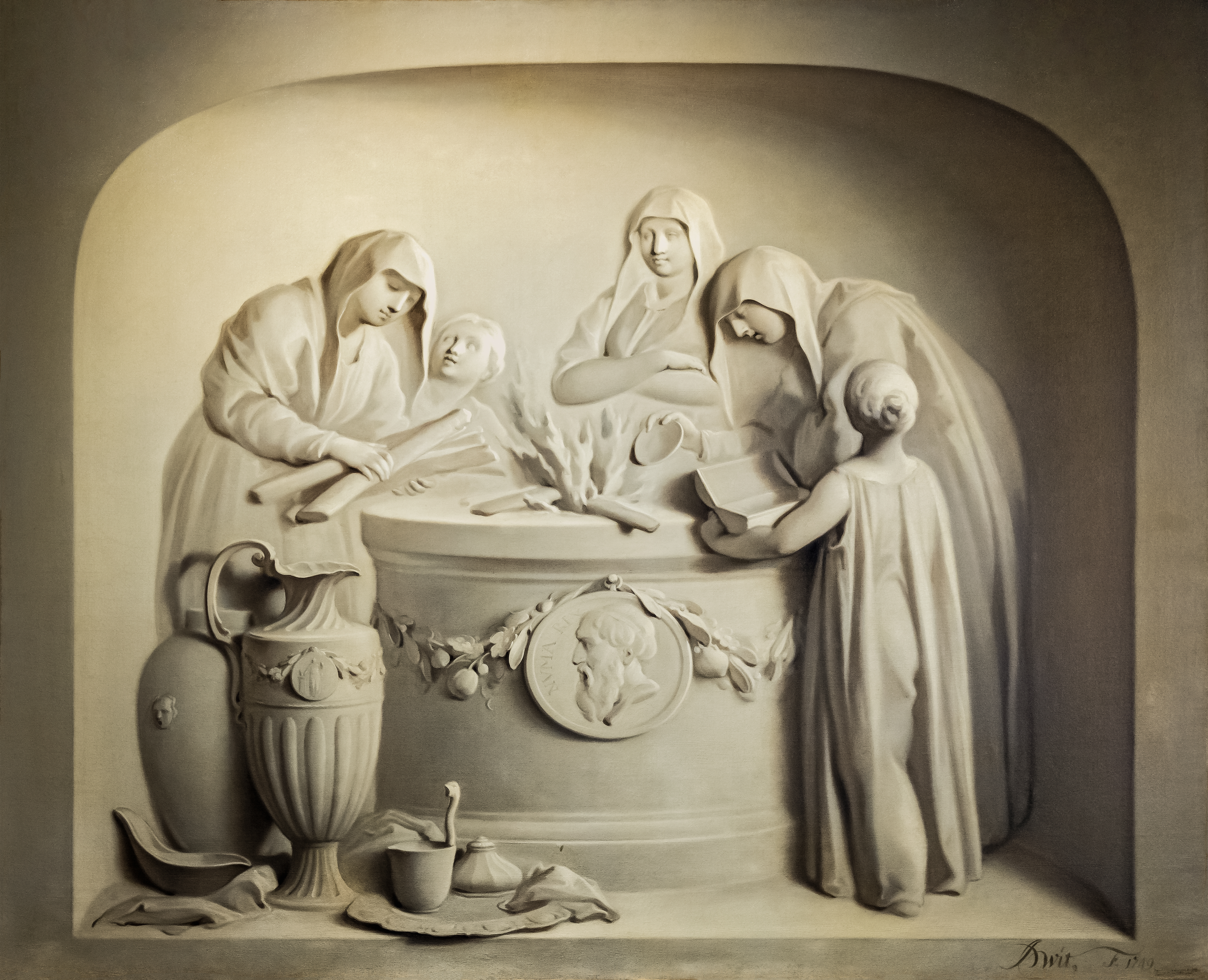
Vestals by Jacob de Wit

According to the RKD, he was the pupil of Albert van Spiers in Amsterdam and Jacob van Hal in Antwerp where he became a member of the Guild of St. Luke in 1714. While in Antwerp, he made a series of watercolour sketches of the Rubens ceilings in the Carolus Borromeuskerk in Antwerp. After the church was struck by lightning in 1718 these became a historical document, and his pupil Jan Punt later engraved his sketches and published them in 1751.

His pupils were Jan de Groot (painter from The Hague), Dionys van Nijmegen, Jan Punt, Pieter Tanjé, and the brothers Frans and Jacob Xavery.

Jacob de Wit died in Amsterdam in 1754. Tako Hajo Jelgersma was his follower.

== Major works ==
- Baptism of Christ in the Jordan (1716) – Chalk and pen drawing
- Adoration of the Shepherds (1726) – Oil on canvas
- Holy Family and Trinity, also : The Return from Egypt (1726) – Oil on canvas
- Allegory of Transience (1733) – Oil on canvas
- Moses Elects Seventy Elders (1737) – Oil on canvas

== Location of paintings ==
- One of his paintings for a door in Heemstede now hangs in Uppsala, Sweden, in the Linnaeus museum.
- A set of paintings of the four seasons depicting cherubs painted in a three-dimensional monochrome style now hangs at Hinton Ampner house in Hampshire.
- Another of his three-dimensional monochrome style cherub paintings hangs in Kingston Lacy house in Dorset.
- Old City Hall in The Hague
- Museum Willet-Holthuysen
