= Asa =

Asa may refer to:

== People and fictional characters ==
- Asa (given name), a given name, including a list of people and fictional characters so named
- Asa people, an ethnic group based in Tanzania
- Aṣa, Nigerian-French singer, songwriter, and recording artist Bukola Elemide (born 1982)
- Asa (rapper), Finnish rapper Matti Salo (born 1980)

== Biblical and mythological figures ==
- Asa of Judah, third king of the Kingdom of Judah and the fifth king of the House of David
- Ása or Æsir, Norse gods

== Places ==
- Asa, Ban Na a subdistrict in Nakhon Nayok, Thailand
- Asa, Hardoi Uttar Pradesh, India, a village
- Asu, South Khorasan, Iran, also spelled Asa, a village
- Asa, Kwara State, Nigeria, a local government area
- Asa River (Japan), a tributary of the Tama River in Tokyo, Japan
- Asa (Kazakhstan), a river
- Asa River (Venezuela), a river in Venezuela

== Other uses ==
- Acrylonitrile styrene acrylate, acrylic styrene acrylonitrile, an amorphous thermoplastic
- Aṣa (album), the debut studio album by Nigerian singer Aṣa
- Asa (album), the sixth studio album by the German Viking metal band Falkenbach
- Asa (raga), a peculiar musical raga in Gurmat Sangeet tradition
- ASA carriage control characters, simple printing command characters used to control the movement of paper through line printers
- Asa language, spoken by the Asa people of Tanzania
- Asa Station, a railway station in San'yō-Onoda, Yamaguchi, Japan
- Asa (railway station), Jambyl Region, Kazakhstan
- Naboot, also called asa, a quarterstaff constructed of palm wood or rattan
- Asha, romanized as aṣ̌a, a Zoroastrian concept
- "Asa", a song by Kitt Wakeley featuring Starr Parodi from An Adoption Story, 2022
- “Asa”, 2024 single by Snazzy the Optimist
- ASA Aarhus, football club from Aarhus, Denmark

== See also ==
- ASA (disambiguation)
- Åsa (disambiguation)
- Aasa (disambiguation)
- Asia (disambiguation)
- Aza (disambiguation)
