= Aase =

Aase is a Norwegian surname and a given name. Notable people with the surname include:

== Surname ==
- Daniel Aase (born 1989), Norwegian footballer
- Dennis Aase (1942–2023), American racing driver
- Don Aase (born 1954), American baseball player
- Gunnar Aase (born 1971), Norwegian footballer
- Hannah Caroline Aase (1883–1980), botanist and cytologist
- Ingvald B. Aase (1882–1948), Norwegian politician
- Olav Aase (1914–1992), Norwegian politician
- Peter Aase (born 1995), Norwegian footballer
- Steinar Aase (born 1955), Norwegian footballer
- Torstein Andersen Aase (born 1991), Norwegian footballer

== Given name ==
- Aase Berg, Swedish poet and critic
- Aase Bjerkholt, Norwegian politician
- Aase Bredsdorff, Danish librarian
- Aase Bye, Norwegian actress
- Aase Foss Abrahamsen, Norwegian author
- Aase Gulbrandsen, Norwegian visual artist
- Aase Hansen (actress)
- Aase Hansen (writer)
- Aase Schibsted Knudsen, Norwegian academic
- Aase Lionæs, Norwegian politician and a socialist feminist
- Aase Lundsteen, Danish painter
- Aase Marthe Horrigmo, Norwegian politician
- Aase Moløkken, Norwegian politician
- Aase Nordmo Løvberg, Norwegian opera soprano
- Aase Olesen, Danish politician
- Aase Schiøtt Jacobsen, Danish badminton player
- Aase Simonsen, Norwegian politician
- Aase Texmon Rygh, Norwegian sculptor
- Aase Winther, Danish badminton player

== Other ==
- Bjørg Aase Sørensen, Norwegian sociologist
- Sonja Aase Ludvigsen, Norwegian politician
- Tarjei Aase Omenås, Norwegian association football player

== See also ==
- Åse (disambiguation)
