= Aase (disambiguation) =

Aase is a Norwegian surname.

Aase may also refer to:

- Hannah Caroline Aase (author abbreviation Aase when citing a botanical name)
- Aase syndrome, rare inherited disorder characterized by anemia with some joint and skeletal deformities
- African American Standard English, a concept tied to African American Vernacular English, and American English
- Peer Gynt, the mother of the title character, Åse, sometimes is spelled 'Aase'
- 864 Aase, an asteroid
- Aase, Kannada name of Siragadikka Aasai (TV series)

== See also ==
- Åse (disambiguation)
