= WSTF =

WSTF may refer to:

- WSTF (FM), a radio station (91.5 FM) licensed to Andalusia, Alabama, United States
- WJRR, a radio station (101.1 FM) licensed to Cocoa Beach, Florida, United States that held the call sign WSTF from 1985 to 1992
- Web Services Test Forum - provides an interoperability test framework for the Web Service community
- White Sands Test Facility - a NASA rocket engine test facility located in the foothills of the Organ Mountains, eleven miles east of Las Cruces, New Mexico
- Westaff - a staffing company based primarily out of Walnut Creek, California, United States and traded publicly on the NASDAQ market, using the stock symbol WSTF
- Williams Syndrome Transcription Factor is another name for the human gene Bromodomain adjacent to zinc finger domain, 1B, also known as BAZ1B
