= ASA =

ASA as an abbreviation or initialism may refer to:

== Biology and medicine ==
- Accessible surface area of a biomolecule, accessible to a solvent
- Acetylsalicylic acid, aspirin
- Advanced surface ablation, refractive eye surgery
- Anterior spinal artery, the blood vessel which supplies the anterior portion of the spinal cord
- Antisperm antibodies, antibodies against sperm antigens
- Argininosuccinic aciduria, a disorder of the urea cycle
- ASA physical status classification system, rating of patients undergoing anesthesia

== Education and research ==
- African Studies Association of the United Kingdom
- African Studies Association
- Alandica Shipping Academy, Åland Islands, Finland
- Albany Students' Association, at Massey University, Auckland, New Zealand
- Alexander-Smith Academy, in Houston, Texas
- Alpha Sigma Alpha, U.S. national sorority
- American Society for Aesthetics, philosophical organization
- Britebound, national non-profit organization
- American Studies Association
- Arizona School for the Arts
- Armenian Sisters Academy
- Association of Social Anthropologists
- Astronomical Society of Australia
- Austrian Studies Association

== Organizations ==
- Acoustical Society of America, international scientific society
- Advertising Standards Authority (disambiguation), advertising regulators in several countries
- American Scientific Affiliation, an organization of Christians in science
- American Society of Agronomy
- American Society of Anesthesiologists
- American Society of Appraisers
- American Sociological Association
- American Staffing Association
- American Standards Association, a former name of the American National Standards Institute
- American Statistical Association
- American Synesthesia Association
- Americans for Safe Access, marijuana law reform group
- Association for Social Advancement, microfinance institution, Bangladesh
- Association for the Study of Abortion
- Association of Scouts of Azerbaijan
- Association of Southeast Asia
- Australian Submarine Agency
- Australian Society of Authors
- Australian Space Agency
- Austrian Service Abroad
- Autism Society of America
- United States Army Security Agency
- Assistant Secretary of the Army, the title given to certain civilian senior officials in the United States Department of the Army
- Azerbaijan Society of America

== Sports ==
- Agremiação Sportiva Arapiraquense, Brazilian soccer club
- Alliance Sport Alsace, French basketball club
- Amateur Softball Association, former name of the governing body now known as USA Softball
- Amateur Swimming Association, former name of Swim England
- American Samoa, IOC country code
- American Speed Association, motorsports sanctioning body
- American Sportscasters Association
- Arizona Soccer Association
- Athletics South Africa, the national governing body for the sport of athletics in South Africa
- Atlético Sport Aviação, Angolan multisports club
- Arbejder Sport Aarhus, Danish football club
- United States Adult Soccer Association

== Transportation ==
- ASA (automobile), Italian marque of automobiles (Autocostruzioni Società per Azioni)
- ASA Aluminium Body, Argentinian manufacturer of replicas of sports cars
- Aeropuertos y Servicios Auxiliares, Mexican airport operator
- African Safari Airways, airline company based in East Africa
- Air services agreement, bilateral agreement to allow international commercial air transport services between signatories
- Atlantic Southeast Airlines, in Atlanta area, Georgia
- Airline Superintendents Association, of Trinidad & Tobago
- Airservices Australia, air traffic management and related services provider for Australia
- The International Civil Aviation Organization's code for Alaska Airlines and Hawaiian Airlines

== Other ==
- ASA ("American Standards Association") a measure of film speed in photography, later replaced by the ISO standard
- Ark: Survival Ascended, an action-adventure survival video game developed by Studio Wildcard
- Acrylonitrile styrene acrylate, a thermoplastic used for 3D printing and in the auto industry
- Adaptive simulated annealing, optimization algorithm
- Cisco ASA (Adaptive Security Appliances)
- Allied States of America, a fictional American nation in the television show Jericho
- Allmennaksjeselskap, the designation for a Norwegian public limited company
- Anti-Soviet agitation, a criminal offense in the Soviet Union
- ASA carriage control characters, a system used for controlling mainframe line printers
- Assistant state's attorney, a title for attorneys working in the state's attorney's office in the United States
- As-salamu alaykum, a greeting in Arabic that means "peace be upon you"
- Auditory scene analysis, a proposed model for the basis of auditory perception

== See also ==
- Åsa (disambiguation)
