= Aasa =

Aasa may refer to:

- Aasá language, an extinct language of Tanzania
- Aasá people, an ethnic group of Tanzania

AASA may refer to:

== Places ==
- Aasa, Estonia, a village in Estonia
- Aasa Buttar, a small village in the Sri Muktsar Sahib district of Eastern Punjab

== Other uses ==
- All Assamese Students' Association, New Delhi, India
- American Association of School Administrators, US
- Australian Auto Sport Alliance
- Automobile Association of South Africa

== People ==
- Aasa Helgesen (1877–1968), Norwegian midwife and politician
- Amanda Aasa (born 1996), Swedish singer and songwriter

== See also ==
- Asa (disambiguation)
- Åsa (disambiguation), a Scandinavian given name
