= Japra =

Japra may refer to:

- Japra, India, a village in Uttar Pradesh
- Japra (river), a left tributary of the Sana (Una) in Bosnia
