= American Staffing Association =

Trade association representing American staffing industry

- Founded: 1966; 60 years ago
- Headquarters: Alexandria, Virginia
- Key people: Stephen C. Dwyer (President and CEO); Edward A. Lenz (Senior Counsel); Jessica E. McClain(Chief Financial Officer); Kelly Verberg (Senior Vice President and Chief Membership Officer)
- Website: americanstaffing.net

The American Staffing Association (ASA) is the trade association representing the American staffing industry. It is headquartered in Alexandria, Virginia.

== History ==
The American Staffing Association began in 1966 as the Institute of Temporary Services in Washington, DC.

The association's first mission was to meet with the U.S. Department of Labor concerning regulations proposed by the former U.S. Employment Service (now the Employment and Training Administration). An important USES mission was to help state employment services provide job-finding assistance to job seekers and employers—functions that sometimes unfairly encroached on private-sector staffing agencies, which did not enjoy the tax-exempt status of their public counterparts.

The association went on to also establish an advocacy role at the state and local level, aided by its network of affiliated chapters, addressing proposed laws and regulations around the country each year.

Soon after its founding, to attract members the association held its first networking and education convention in 1967, followed by industry publications including a magazine and newsletter. In 1985, Congress passed a joint resolution establishing “National Temporary Help Services Week.”. ASA now announces an annual National Staffing Employee Week, which usually takes place in the second week of September.

In 2003, ASA introduced the first of four professional certification programs. In 2016, the association celebrated 50 years of service.

The association's name has changed over the years to reflect changes in the scope —National Association of Temporary Services (1970), National Association of Temporary and Staffing Services (1994); American Staffing Association (1999).

== Training programs ==
ASA offers a number of credentialing programs, including:

- Certified Staffing Professional (CSP);
- Technical Services Certified (TSC);
- Certified Search Consultant (CSC); and
- Certified Health Care Staffing Professional.

ASA also holds regular industry-specific webinars regarding issues pertaining to the staffing industry, usually held on Tuesdays at 2:00 p.m. Eastern. These webinars are later available in an on-demand library for members. Recordings of virtual events can also be purchased in the ASA Learn store.

In addition, ASA offers online training programs on anti-harassment, occupational safety and health, workforce management, etc.

== Advocacy ==
ASA also partakes in legislative advocacy at the federal, state, and local levels. In 2023, they were awarded a special honor by the World Employment Confederation for their work advocating for travel nurses in the midst of the COVID-19 pandemic.

== Members ==
The list of prominent ASA member staffing agencies in alphabetical order;

- Adecco Staffing
- Aerotek
- Elwood Staffing
- Kelly Services
- ManpowerGroup
- PageGroup
- Randstad NV
- Robert Half International
- Volt Technical Resources
- Westaff
