= Aase Berg =

Swedish poet and critic

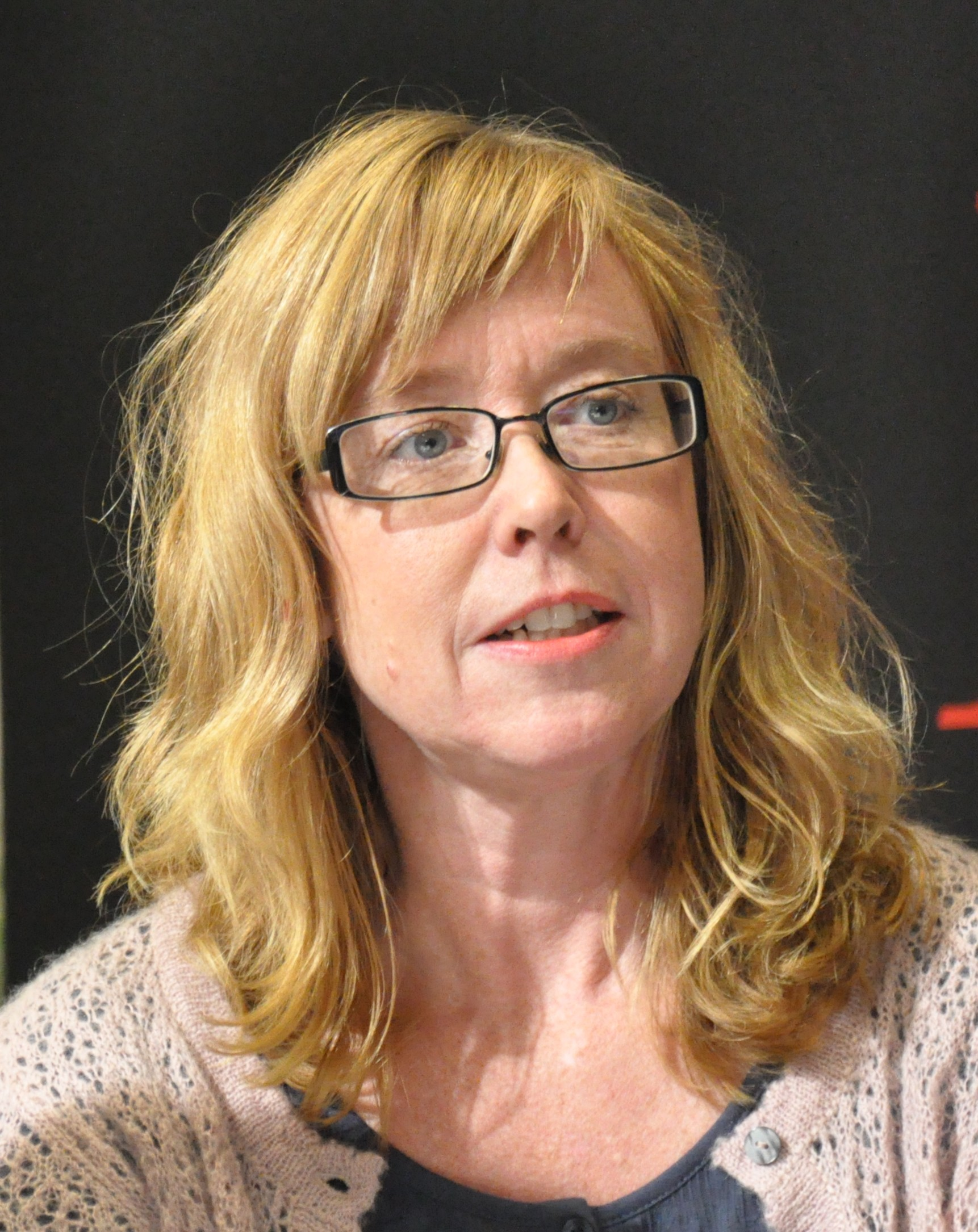
Aase Berg, 2011

Aase Berg (pronounced [ˈôːsɛ ˈbærj]; born 1967) is a Swedish poet and critic.

Aase Berg was among the founding members of the Stockholm Surrealist Group in 1986 and published an early book on their publishing company Surrealistförlaget in 1988. Since 1997 she had several collections of poetry published by various branches of the Bonnier publishing house. Aase Berg made her debut as a prose writer with a short story in the collection Perversioner: 12 noveller om avvikelser, published on Vertigo, the publishing company of Carl-Michael Edenborg, another member of the Stockholm surrealist group. Berg has also been editor of the literary journal Bonniers Litterära Magasin (commonly known as BLM), has contributed to the journal 90tal, later renamed 00tal, and is a critic for the newspaper Expressen.

In 2025, the publication of Berg's book Vi är snart framme sparked a cultural controversy. The conflict arose from Berg's inclusion of personal attacks and violent rhetoric directed at literary critics who had not given her previous work positive reviews. Berg called the controversy "extremely banal."

== Awards and honours ==
- 2013 Best Translated Book Award, shortlist, Transfer Fat

== Selected publications ==
- Hos rådjur : prosadikter (Stockholm : Bonnier Alba, 1997)
- Mörk materia (Stockholm : Bonnier, 1999)
- Forsla fett : dikter (Stockholm : Bonnier, 2002)
- Contributed to Perversioner : 12 noveller om avvikelser, ed. by Viktoria Jäderling (Stockholm: Vertigo 2003)
- Uppland: dikter (Stockholm: Bonnier, 2005)
- Remainland: Selected Poems of Aase Berg, translated by Johannes Göransson (Tuscaloosa: Action Books, 2005)
- With Deer, translated by Johannes Göransson (Boston: Black Ocean, 2009)
