= Pura Bahadur =

Pura Bahadur Pura Bahādur
- Populated place
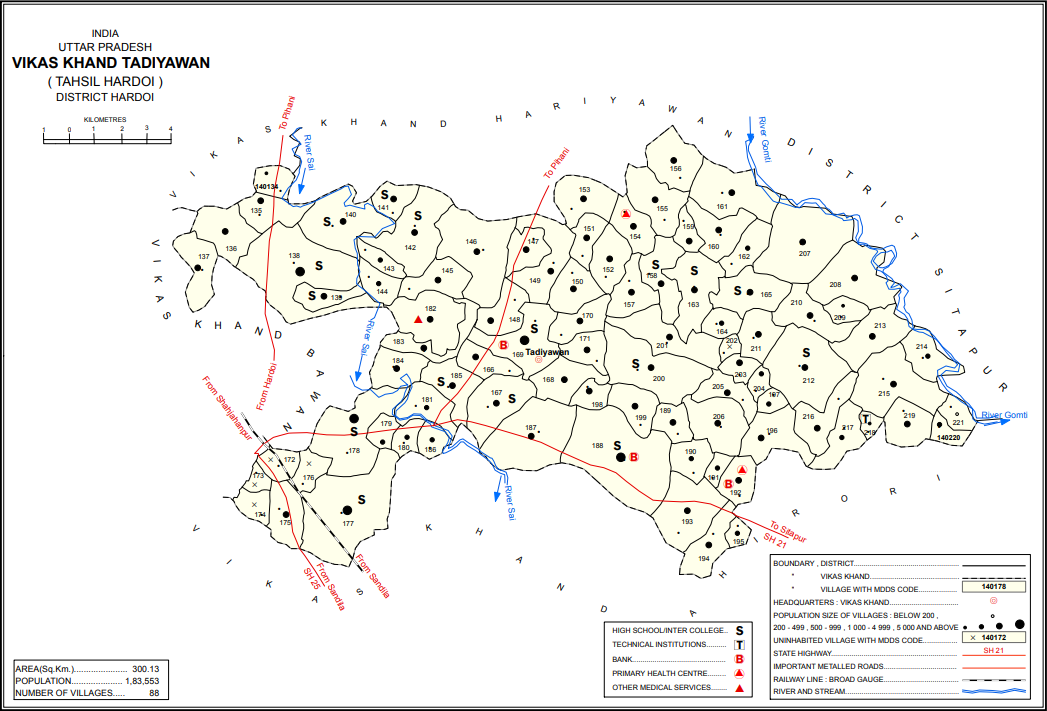
- Map showing Pura Bahadur (#138) in Tadiyawan CD block

- Location in Uttar Pradesh, India Pura Bahadur (India)
- Coordinates: 27.464519°N 80.153565°E
- Country: India
- State: Uttar Pradesh
- District: Hardoi

Area
  - Total: 9.631 km^{2} (3.719 sq mi)

Population (2011)
  - Total: 5,594
  - Density: 580.8/km^{2} (1,504/sq mi)

Languages
  - Official: Hindi
- Time zone: UTC+5:30 (IST)

Pura Bahadur is a village in Tadiyawan block of Hardoi district, Uttar Pradesh, India. Located a few kilometres from the city of Hardoi, the village is connected to state highways and hosts a market on Wednesdays and Sundays. Pura Bahadur has two primary schools and a sub post office. There are no hospitals for humans, although there is a veterinary facility. The main staple foods are wheat and rice. As of 2011, the population of Pura Bahadur is 5,594, in 964 households.

== Demographic history ==
The 1961 census recorded Pura Bahadur as comprising 10 hamlets, with a total population of 2,325 (1,257 male and 1,068 female), in 518 households and 394 physical houses. The area of the village was given as 2,380 acres.

The 1981 census recorded Pura Bahadur as having a population of 3,025, in 490 households, and covering an area of 963.19 hectares.
