= Ad Standards =

Australian advertising complaint resolution process

- Headquarters: Braddon, Australian Capital Territory
- Region served: Australia
- Website: adstandards.com.au

Ad Standards, formerly Advertising Standards Bureau (ASB), is Australia's advertising regulator. It manages the complaint resolution process of the advertising self-regulation system in Australia, receiving no funding from government.

== History ==
Ad Standards was established in 1998 by the Advertising industry to regulate complaints about advertising in Australia. It started as the Advertising Standards Bureau (ASB) but was rebranded to Ad Standards in 2018.

Ad Standards originally only considered complaints under the Australian Association of National Advertisers (AANA) Code of Ethics. The remit of it has since expanded to administering a range of Codes.

In 2006 Ad Standards joined the European Advertising Standards Alliance (EASA) to ensure access to an appropriate best practice model for advertising complaint resolution. It complies absolutely with the European Advertising Standards Alliance (EASA) Best Practice Principles.

== Description and scope ==
Ad Standards functions as secretariat for the Ad Standards Community Panel and the Ad Standards Industry Jury – the two independent bodies were established to determine consumer and competitive complaints against the advertising self-regulatory Codes. It is governed by a Board of Directors. Its headquarters are in Braddon, Australian Capital Territory.

The advertising self-regulation system is funded by a levy on advertising in Australia.

Ad Standards considers complaints about advertising or marketing material across all mediums in Australia.

It will accept a complaint if it falls under any of the Codes it administers. It administers a range of Codes for the Australian Association of National Advertisers, including:

- The AANA Code of Ethics
- The AANA Code for Advertising and Marketing Communications to Children
- The AANA Food & Beverages Advertising and Marketing Communications Code
- The AANA Environmental Claims in Advertising & Marketing Code
- The AANA Wagering Advertising & Marketing Communications Code

It also administers the Voluntary Code of Practice for Motor Vehicle Advertising for the Federal Chamber of Automotive Industries.

Ad Standards collects complaints for the Alcoholic Beverages Advertising Code Scheme's Responsible Alcohol Marketing Code, however adjudication under this Code is made by the ABAC Adjudication Panel.

== Complaint process ==
Members of the public can make complaints about any advertising in writing to Ad Standards, either through their website, or post.

Once a complaint is received Ad Standards will assess the complaint and if it falls under the scope of the Codes the complaint will be forwarded to the Ad Standards Community Panel for assessment. Advertisers are also given a chance to provide a response to the Panel.

The Panel is made up of members of the community who have no connection to the advertising industry or interest groups. The Panel includes people from a broad range of age groups and backgrounds and is gender balanced.

The Panel meets twice a month to consider complaints. The panel will consider the complaint/s, the advertisement and the advertiser's response and make a determination based on whether the advertisement breaches any of the provisions under the Codes.

If a complaint against any advertisement is upheld the advertiser is asked to remove or amend the offending advertisement as soon as possible.

Copies of all decisions made by the Panel are published on the Ad Standards website.

== Statistics and issues ==
Ad Standards receives thousands of complaints every year. In 2023 it received more than 3500 complaints and investigated more than 250 different advertisements.

The main issues of concern were sexual appeal, violence, and demonstrating behaviour contrary to community health and safety standards.

== See also ==
- Advertising Standards Authority
- Australian Classification Board
- Censorship in Australia
