= Tadiyawan =

Tadiyawan Tandiyawan
- Populated place
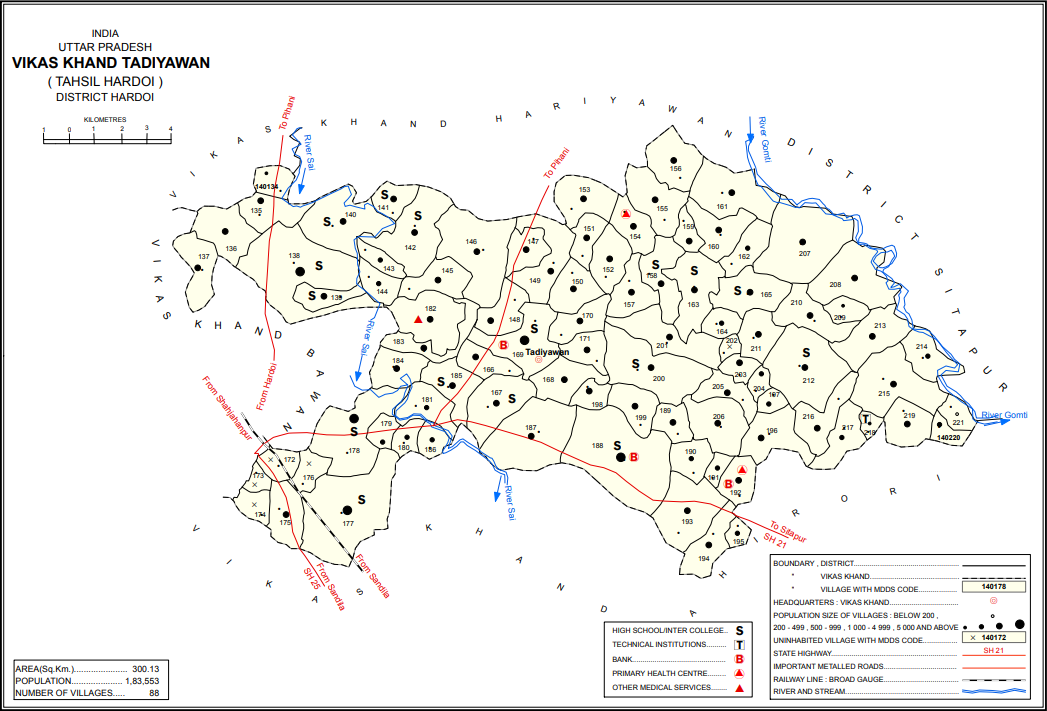
- Map showing Tadiyawan (#169) in Tadiyawan CD block

- Location in Uttar Pradesh, India Tadiyawan (India)
- Country: India
- State: Uttar Pradesh
- District: Hardoi

Area
  - Total: 5.16 km^{2} (1.99 sq mi)

Population (2011)
  - Total: 5,998
  - Density: 1,160/km^{2} (3,010/sq mi)

Languages
  - Official: Hindi
- Time zone: UTC+5:30 (IST)

Tadiyawan, also spelled Tandiyawan, is a village and corresponding community development block in Hardoi district of Uttar Pradesh, India. Located 14 km from the city of Hardoi, it hosts a regular market and hosts a Deviji festival on Chaitra Sudi 8 dedicated to worship of the goddess Devi. The village has two primary schools but no healthcare facilities. As of 2011, the population of Tadiyawan is 5,998, in 1,079 households.

== Demographic history ==
The 1961 census recorded Tadiyawan as comprising 4 hamlets, with a total population of 2,078 (1,132 male and 946 female), in 463 households and 378 physical houses. The area of the village was given as 1,371 acres. Average attendance of the Deviji fair was listed as about 600 people at the time.

The 1981 census recorded Tadiyawan as having a population of 2,866, in 563 households, and covering an area of 565.37 hectares.

== Villages ==
Tadiyawan CD block has the following 88 villages:

Village name	Total land area (hectares)	Population (in 2011)
Ahrapur	203.5	396
Bargawan	357	2,356
Patkuawan	451.5	2,555
Danialgang	299.8	2,316
Pura Bahadur	963.1	5,594
Jio	161.8	1,302
Nanhey	562.2	3,489
Shivri	199.3	1,550
Lilwal	591.4	3,805
Tari	159.8	841
Odra	225	878
Garhi	256.9	2,051
Japra	662.3	3,633
Harri	227.4	2,190
Sikanderpur	312.8	2,812
Alisa Bad	371.7	2,537
Barauli	304	2,790
Jigniya Khurd	167.5	1,467
Jigniya Kalan	275.5	1,213
Rawal	332.4	2,722
Rawal	278.3	2,285
Ayari	404.5	2,153
Lalpur Bhaisari	384.8	1,988
Mahmadapur	221	2,192
Adampur	347.3	2,744
Sainchamau	131.9	1,026
Purwa Deoriya	326	1,848
Ali Nager	602.8	2,662
Shahpur Mugul	238.8	843
Fukha	464.2	3,227
Teliyani	123.7	758
Hariharpur	404.3	4,103
Nevada	213	1,205
Gauradanda	429.8	2,892
Sainti	276.9	2,238
Tandiyawan (block headquarters)	516	5,998
Kherwa Dalauli	277.7	1,673
Nivuai	186.4	1,936
Dhear Maholiya	73.4	0
Nagheta	35.5	0
Behta Chand	129.8	0
Nanakgang Grant	369.7	1,985
Ramnagar	140.7	0
Bahar	1,134.3	7,922
Asa	809.3	5,734
Murligang	85.9	649
Haripur Grant	169.8	696
Parsani	257.3	876
Sandila	518.5	4,843
Narainpur Grant	238.7	1,283
Pala	285	2,152
Unouti	280.1	2,434
Itoli	177.8	968
Sikrohari	774.6	3,139
Bharayal	1,211.8	6,679
Saripur Chhachheta	243.1	1,445
Dadwani	252	874
Bargadiya	104	525
Kala Aam	202.4	1,582
Kakumau	517.2	2,398
Jagrauli	355.2	1,667
Sardapur	78.7	708
Sakhin	493.5	2,690
Ramuapur	88	688
Bojhwa	136.1	1,121
Sagrapur	192.9	1,744
Thokkhala	781.2	4,108
Bhaunsari	529.2	3,932
Kherwa Mahmoodpur	55.6	0
Gulrhiha	186.9	1,669
Navrangpur	91.7	577
Bharaon	251.6	2,306
Gursanda	446.1	3,786
Sekhora	907.8	2,893
Barra Sarain	545.2	2,212
Masinha	94.6	247
Amethya	322.7	1,678
Sihona	280.5	2,936
Kotra	694.4	3,054
Deviya Fatteypur	421.8	2,326
Karanpur	289	895
Jayrajpur	625.4	3,200
Bhaunta Kamalpur	300.1	1,862
Semrauli	327.5	805
Kuanmau	86.1	228
Baruar	252.3	1,003
Jiginiya	138.8	699
Saadeepur	117	67
