= Carl-Michael Edenborg =

Swedish writer, critic, editor, publisher and historian

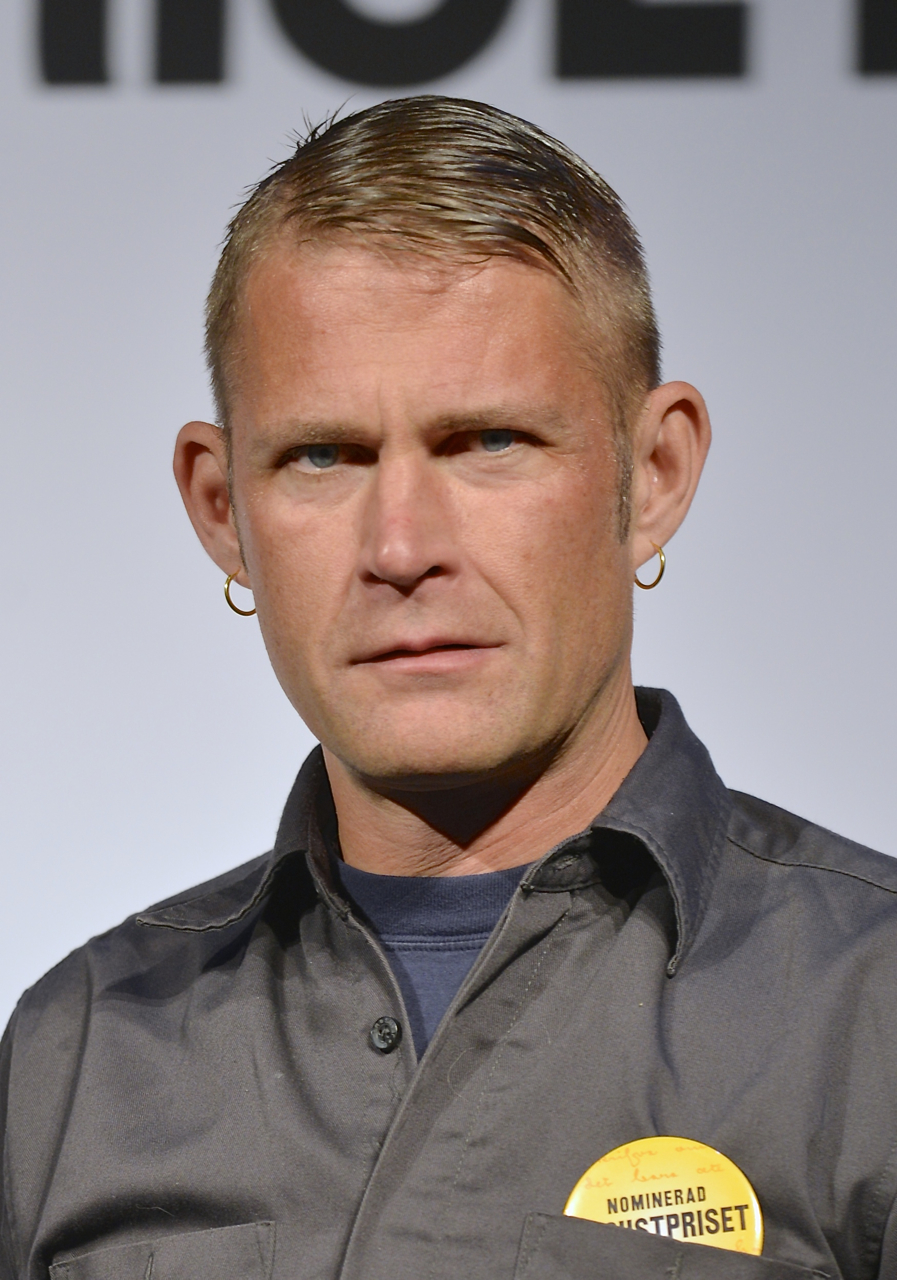
C.-M. Edenborg in 2014.

Carl-Michael Edenborg (formerly surnamed Strömberg; born 1967), is a Swedish writer, critic, editor, publisher and historian of ideas and literature.

== Academic career ==
Edenborg has studied the history of alchemy, and completed a PhD in the History of Ideas at Stockholm University in 2002 with a dissertation on alchemy in Sweden in the age of Enlightenment, The shame of alchemy: expulsion of the alchemical tradition from the public sphere. The work was awarded with the Paracelsus prize by the Swedish Paracelsus Society and was published in an extended second edition in 2004. He had previously touched on the subject in his biography of Gustaf Bonde, a Swedish 18th century statesman known for his political memoirs, who was also a pseudo-historian in the Rudbeckian tradition and an alchemist, and in an article on another Swedish alchemist, Fabian Wilhelm af Ekenstam, both from 1997. He teaches at Stockholm University.

== Other intellectual activities ==
Edenborg was one of the founding members of the Stockholm Surrealist Group in 1986 and published several books on its publishing company Surrealistförlaget. During the 1990s he started his own publishing company, Vertigo, which, among other things, has published a Swedish translation of Horace Walpole's The Castle of Otranto ("Borgen i Otranto, 1996) in Paul Soares' translation. Edenborg has taken an interest in early pornography and other literature beyond the mainstream canon. He has written a short article in the bibliographic journal Biblis on "the first Swedish pornography". Vertigo has published the Marquis de Sade in Swedish translation, and a series of books called the "Classics of transgressions" (Överträdelsens klassiker), including works by Dennis Cooper, Samuel R. Delany, Georges Bataille, Gabrielle Wittkop, Pauline Réage and more in the same tradition.

In 2011, he co-wrote a graphic novel with his then wife, the illustrator Loka Kanarp: Hungerhuset. It was translated to French: La Maison de la Faim by French editor Actes Sud, and in 2014 into English: Hunger House published by Borderline Press. In 2012, Edenborg's novel Mitt grymma öde about the life of composer George Frideric Handel was published to some critical acclaim. In the same year he wrote a manifesto, Det parapornografiska manifestet, which was published in the U.S. by Action books under the title The Parapornographic Manifesto. Recently, he has revealed that he also wrote the novels and short stories that were published under the pseudonym Gunnar Blå.

In 2014, his novel Alkemistens dotter was nominated for the August Prize.

Edenborg works as a critic for the Swedish daily newspaper Aftonbladet and runs a café that was first located in Stockholm's Old Town but now is in Södermalm.

== Selected publications ==
- Bortom lustprincipen: Titlar av Sigmund Freud. A collage by Bruno Jacobs and C.-M. Strömberg; texts by H. Christian Werner (Stockholm: Surrealistförl., 1988)
- Ett brott: Det är: tankar, fantasier, drömmar, förbannelser och lögner... Octavia, with illustrations by Kajsa Bergh (Stockholm: Surrealistförl., 1988)
- Blodstrupe (Stockholm: Surrealistförl., 1989)
- Runornas erotik (Stockholm: Surrealistförl., 1989)
- "Fabian Wilhelm af Ekenstam – romantiker och alkemist", Personhistorisk tidskrift 93 (1997), pp. 90–115.
- "Wallenska vissamlingen och den första svenska pornografin", Biblis 2000(3):3/4 = nr 11/12, pp. 22–24.
- Gull och mull: Den monstruöse Gustaf Bonde, upplysningens fiende i frihetstidens Sverige: Historien om hans exkrementalkemi, hans krets och värld: försedd med psykoanalytiska, Batailleska och historiematerialistiska reflexioner, samt ett utkast mot döden. (Lund: Ellerström, 1997)
- Alkemins skam: Den alkemiska traditionens utstötning ur offentligheten ("The shame of alchemy: Expulsion of the alchemical tradition from the public sphere"). (Univ. of Stockholm 2002, 2nd ed. 2004)
- Hungerhuset ("House of Hunger"). (Stockholm: Kolik bokförlag 2011)
- Mitt grymma öde ("My cruel fate"). (Stockholm: Natur & Kultur, 2012)
- Det parapornografiska manifestet ("The Parapornographic Manifesto"). (Stockholm: Ink bokförlag, 2012)
