= Sikandarpur, Tadiyawan =

Sikandarpur
- Populated place
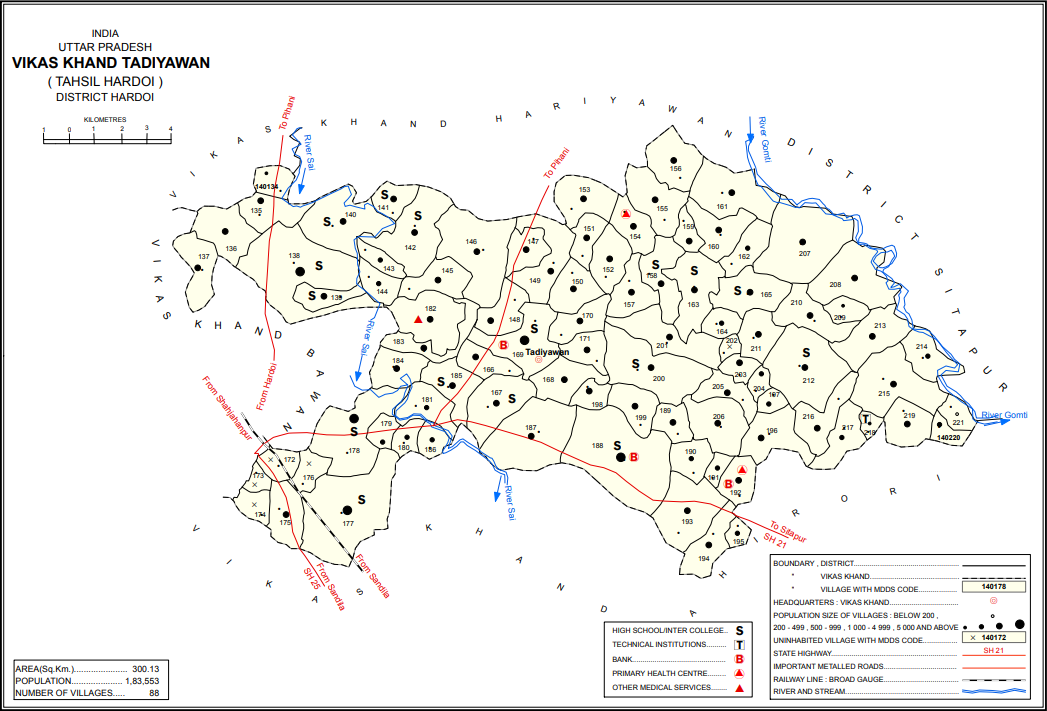
- Map showing Sikandarpur (#148) in Tadiyawan CD block

- Location in Uttar Pradesh, India Sikandarpur (India)
- Coordinates: 27.451914°N 80.245597°E
- Country: India
- State: Uttar Pradesh
- District: Hardoi

Area
  - Total: 3.128 km^{2} (1.208 sq mi)

Population (2011)
  - Total: 2,812
  - Density: 899.0/km^{2} (2,328/sq mi)

Languages
  - Official: Hindi
- Time zone: UTC+5:30 (IST)

Sikandarpur is a village in Tadiyawan block of Hardoi district, Uttar Pradesh, India. As of 2011, its population is 2,812, in 493 households. Located by the Sarda Canal, Sikandarpur's topography varies from flat to gently sloping, and its soil ranges from alluvial silty loam to mixed silty and clayey loam with imperfect drainage. It is almost exclusively an agricultural village, with few non-agricultural employment opportunities. It is characterised by a landownership pattern of very small, fragmented holdings.

The 1961 census recorded Sikandarpur as comprising three hamlets, with a total population of 1,057 (562 male and 495 female), in 214 households and 160 physical houses. The area of the village was given as 774 acres.

Sikandarpur (specifically, the namesake hamlet within the village unit of Sikandarpur) was one of two pilot sites (the other being the hamlet of Kotpurva in the village of Alisabad) chosen for Phase I an usar (alkaline soil)-reclamation project that began in early 1986 and expanded to include sites in 12 districts for Phase II in 1987. At that time, the hamlet had a population of 398, in 65 families. Its extent was listed as 75 hectares, 18.4% of which was counted as usar land and another 7% of which was waterlogged. The result was that per capita availability of arable land was extremely low, and most farmers' lands were tiny and highly fragmented. Agriculture in the hamlet was unmechanised, with no families owning a tractor and a significant portion not owning a plough and/or a pair of bullocks. As a result, farm productivity was low. Most farmers interviewed said that they did not grow enough produce even for their own needs, and they could not afford to invest in agricultural technology.
