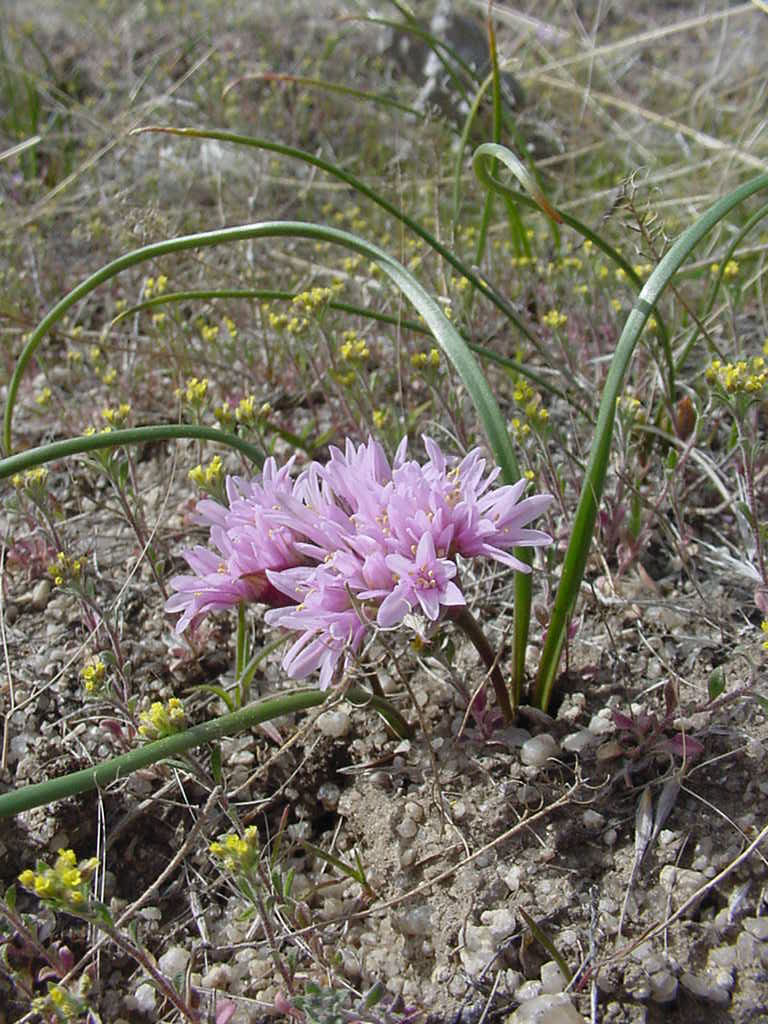
- Allium aaseae in Southwestern Idaho

Conservation status
- Imperiled (NatureServe)

Scientific classification
- Kingdom: Plantae
- Clade: Tracheophytes
- Clade: Angiosperms
- Clade: Monocots
- Order: Asparagales
- Family: Amaryllidaceae
- Subfamily: Allioideae
- Genus: Allium
- Species: A. aaseae

Binomial name
- Allium aaseae Ownbey

= Allium aaseae =

Species of flowering plant

Allium aaseae, the Southern Idaho onion or Aase's onion, is a plant species endemic to southwestern Idaho. It has been reported from 6 counties: Elmore, Ada, Boise, Gem, Payette and Washington.

The plant is named for American botanist Hannah Caroline Aase (1883-1980), at one time professor at Washington State University in Pullman.

Allium aaseae grows on sandy and gravelly sites at elevations of 800–1100 m. It has egg-shaped bulbs up to 2 cm in diameter, and pink or white bell-shaped flowers up to 10 mm long.
