= Aza =

Aza or AZA may refer to:

== Places ==
- Aza, Azerbaijan, a village and municipality
- Azadkənd, Nakhchivan or Lower Aza, Azerbaijan
- Aza, medieval name of Haza, Province of Burgos, Spain
- Aźa, a Tibetan name for the Tuyuhun kingdom
- Aza, a Hebrew romanization for Gaza City or Gaza Strip

== People ==
- Aza (given name)
- Aza of Mannea, king, reigned c. 710–700 BC
- Alejandro De Aza (born 1984), Dominican baseball outfielder
- Vital Aza (1851–1912), Spanish author, playwright, poet and satirist

== Other uses ==
- Aza (Kanji: 字), a village or town section in the Japanese addressing system
- Aza-, prefix used in chemistry to name compounds that contain a nitrogen atom
- Azelanic acid, an organic acid used for medical treatment of acne and as whitening agent
- Azacitidine ('AZA': drug and methylation inhibitor)
- Aza (slang), Nigerian slang term that refers to bank account digits, specifically the account number.

== Abbreviations or initialisms ==
- Association of Zoos and Aquariums (formerly named "American Zoo and Aquarium Association")
- Aleph Zadik Aleph, a Jewish youth group that is part of BBYO
- ISO 639-3 aza for Azha language, a language of China
- ICAO code for Alitalia, an Italian airline
- IATA code for Phoenix-Mesa Gateway Airport

== See also ==
- Asa (disambiguation)
