= Advertising Standards Authority =

Advertising Standards Authority may refer to:

- Ad Standards, formerly the Advertising Standards Bureau, Australia
- Advertising Standards Authority (Ireland)
- Advertising Standards Authority (New Zealand)
- Advertising Standards Authority (South Africa)
- Advertising Standards Authority (United Kingdom)
- Advertising Standards Canada
- Advertising Standards Council of India
- Advertising Standards Council (Philippines)

== See also ==
- Advertising
- ASA (disambiguation)
