= The Surrealist Group in Stockholm =

The Surrealist group in Stockholm (in Swedish Surrealistgruppen i Stockholm) is a Swedish group of surrealists. It has been criticised as, though it regards itself as a subversive group outside the cultural establishment, some of its members have gone on to occupy more central positions on the Swedish literary field.

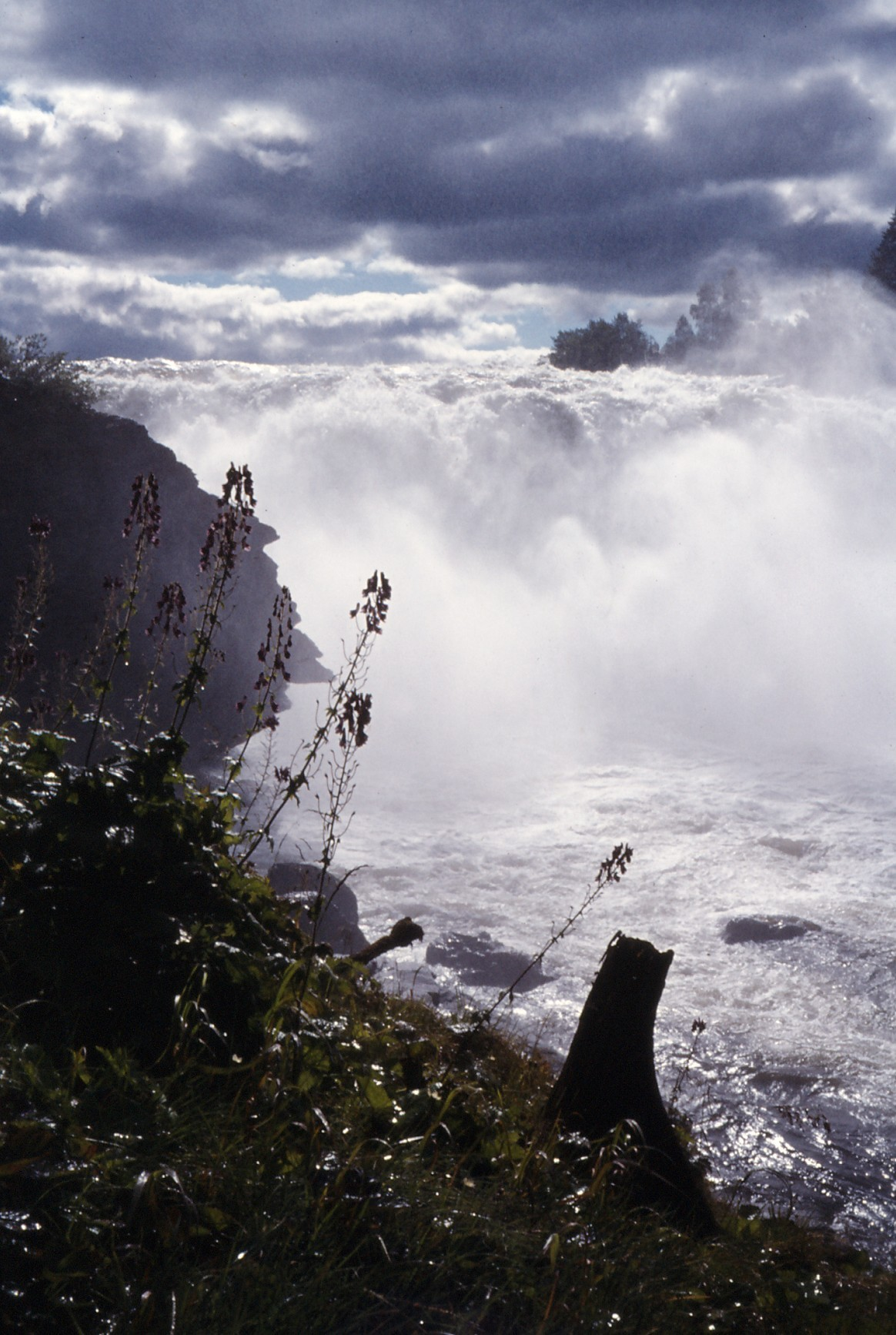
Ristafallet

The group describes itself as being founded in 1986, on Midsummer's Eve, close to a waterfall called Ristafallet in Hålland in Jämtland, in central Sweden. They started to publish collections of poetry or prose texts under their imprint Surrealistförlaget in 1987. In an article from 2001, Lasse Söderberg (a Swedish writer belonging to an older generation) describes them, from an encounter in 1988 as "a few serious-looking young men", headquartered as the "Surrealist research bureau" in an antiquarian bookstore close to Strindberg's "Blue tower" (his famous last residence on the street Drottninggatan on Norrmalm). Their publications included a journal published first in 1987–1988 (4 issues), then variously and irregularly as Nakna läppar, Kvicksand (1 issue, 1989), Kalla handen (2 issues, 1994) and finally as Stora saltet (9 issues, 1995–1998). Stora Saltet contained poetic, surreal texts and the editorials were often philosophical and/or political. In Söderberg's view the content of the journal was of mixed quality, but he particularly appreciated the speculative writings of Johannes Bergmark and Carl-Michael Edenborg (born 1967) on subjects like erotica, money, alchemy, and music.

According to Söderberg, the group consciously cut itself off from the "cultural establishment", but as their activities as a group cooled down – Stora saltet was last published in 1998 – the members turned in other directions. In a brief article on Stora saltet in Expressen 27 November 1995, Agneta Klingspor urges the reader to remember the name of Aase Berg (born 1967), a young poet publishing in Stora Saltet. Berg made her serious literary debut two years later with a collection of poetry on the prestigious publishing house Bonniers, and has since emerged as one of the most significant poets in Sweden, and as editor of the leading literary journal BLM and critic for Expressen, she has been firmly placed within the cultural establishment. Edenborg, who started his own publishing company Vertigo, meanwhile continued to take an interest in alchemy and, beside other writings on the subject, in 2002 completed a doctoral dissertation on alchemy in Sweden during the 18th century. Another of the members of the group around Stora saltet (according to Anneli Jordahl in DN 16 February 2001) was the novelist Maja Lundgren (born 1965), whose novel Pompeji (Bonniers, 2001) has been translated into several languages and (in 2005) nominated for the Italian prize Premio Bancarella. She made her debut as a novelist already in the early 1990s and has since regularly been writing for the literary journal 90tal (later 00tal) and the daily paper Aftonbladet.

Other members of the group include Kajsa Bergh, Bruno Jacobs, H. Christian Werner, Helena Boberg and Mattias Forshage. Forshage is a naturalist, as of 2005 working on a dissertation in entomology at Uppsala University, whose poetry in Angående näktergalarna man fann på glaciärisen (Lund: Ellerströms 1998), written in the surrealist tradition of automatic writing, takes its point of departure in various ornithological or geologic observations made at visits to the Swedish Museum of Natural History in Stockholm. Johannes Bergmark, mentioned above, works as a musician and composer, has recorded a number of CDs and performed on festivals internationally.

Although less active in later years, the group maintains a website, where some of the texts from Stora saltet may be read, and the last text is dated 2002.

== See also ==
- Chicago Surrealist Group
