= Åse =

Åse may refer to:

== People ==
- Tone Åse (born 1965), Norwegian singer

=== Given name ===
- Åse Birkrem, Norwegian handball player
- Åse Fosli, Norwegian politician for the Conservative Party
- Åse Hedstrøm, Norwegian composer based in Stockholm, Sweden
- Åse Idland, retired Norwegian biathlete
- Åse Kleveland, Swedish-Norwegian singer and politician
- Åse Klundelien, Norwegian politician for the Labour Party
- Åse Gruda Skard, Norwegian psychologist, and a pioneer in the field of the bringing up of children
- Åse Michaelsen, Norwegian politician representing the Progress Party
- Agnetha Fältskog, born Åse Agnetha Fältskog, Swedish singer, songwriter, musician and actress, best known as a member of ABBA

=== Characters ===
- Åse, a character in the 1867 play Peer Gynt by Henrik Ibsen

== Places ==
- Åse, Nordland, a village in Andøy municipality in Nordland county, Norway
- Åse Hundred, a hundred in Sweden

== See also ==
- Asa (disambiguation)
- Åsa (disambiguation), for the Swedish version of the name
