= Asa, Ban Na =

Subdistrict in Nakhon Nayok

Asa ตำบลอาษา
- Subdistrict
- Country: Thailand
- Province: Nakhon Nayok
- District: Ban Na

Government
  - Type: Subdistrict Administrative Organization (SAO)
  - Head of SAO: Under election

Population (2026)
  - Total: 1,616
- Time zone: UTC+7 (ICT)

Asa (Thai: ตำบลอาษา, pronounced [ʔáː.sàː]) is a tambon (subdistrict) of Ban Na District, in Nakhon Nayok province, Thailand. In 2026, it had a population of 1,616 people.

== History ==
The name Asa is from the ancestors of the locals in the area which fought Cambodia soldiers during a war.

The history dates to the Ayutthaya period during the reign of King Naresuan. At that time, Cambodia was reportedly allied with Ayutthaya.

When Burmese forces invaded Ayutthaya, King Naresuan led his army to counter the Burmese advance, withdrawing troops through the area of Prachin Buri. The Khmer forces then launched an invasion into Siam through Kabin Buri.

The guards of King Naresuan reportedly mobilized local residents to resist the invasion. Among these were villagers later associated with Asa subdistrict, who migrated from Vientiane.

== Administration ==
=== Central administration ===
The tambon is divided into eight administrative villages (mubans).

No.	Name	Thai	Population
1.	Jek	เจ๊ก	169
2.	Asa	อาษา	127
3.	Phai Khwang	ไผ่ขวาง	728
4.	Nong Son	หนองโสน	101
5.	Khok Prasert	โคกประเสริฐ	294
6.	Khlong Vua	คลองวัว	151
7.	Khlong 31	คลอง 31	257
8.	Srabout	สระโบสถ์	388
