= Kajsa Bergh =

Swedish surrealist artist

Kajsa Bergh (born 1967) is a Swedish surrealist, one of the seven cofounders of The Surrealist Group in Stockholm in 1986.

== Writing ==
- 'Desire', Arsenal/Surrealist Subversion, No. 4 (1989). Reprinted in Penelope Rosemont, ed., Surrealist Women, 2000, p.456.
