= All Assamese Students' Association, New Delhi =

Students' organisation

All Assamese Students' Association
- Abbreviation: AASA
- Formation: 1 April 2009; 16 years ago
- Type: Student organization
- Region served: New Delhi, India
- President: Subhra Jyoti Duarah

All Assamese Students' Association or AASA is a students' organisation for the students of Assam studying in Delhi. They have been organising various events and activities to hold and safeguard the culture and tradition of Assam in the Capital of India and adjacent regions.

== Help Desk ==
All Assamese Students' Association organises Annual Admission Help Desk in various cities of Assam along with telephonic support. These help desks are run by students who are currently studying in the University of Delhi and other colleges of NCR to help students of Assam in the admission process of their colleges.

Every year thousands of students get help in their admission and other necessary requirements through this help desk.

== Frestival ==
Frestival is an Annual event organised by All Assamese Students' Association, New Delhi to welcome the fresher students from Assam. It usually happen between August–September. They invite artists like the local train, Neel akash to entertain students.

== Bohagi Utsav ==
Bohagi Utsav is a celebration of Assamese new year Bohag Bihu, All Assamese Students' Association organizes Bohagi Utsav annually with the participation of many Assamese people staying in Delhi. Many popular artists like Zubeen Garg, Deeplina Deka, Amrita Gogoi had performed in the event.

== Mamoni Raisom Goswami Memorial National Debate ==
The Mamoni Raisom Goswami Memorial National Debate Competition is organized every year By AASA, ND in memory of literateur Dr. Indira Goswami.

== Other Activities ==
All Assamese Students' Association also organise various events like Health camps for slum children, Children's Day in Slum Areas, Motivational Talk sessions, Career Counseling Sessions, Saraswati Puja, Annual Sports Day etc. All Assamese students' Association always been raising their voice for Assam. They participated in the Anti CAA Protests in Delhi; they initiated various fund raisers in critical times like the flood in Assam and the COVID-19 Scare.

== Pratidhwani ==
Pratidhwani, literally meaning 'echo', is the annual magazine of the All Assamese Students' Association, New Delhi. It compiles the plethora of art from a wide range of contributors and serves as an account of one whole year's achievement as well as growth of the Association.

== See also ==
- All Assam Students' Union
- Bohag Bihu
