= Aase Bredsdorff =

Danish librarian (1919–2017)

Aase Dilling Bredsdorff (née Larsen; 20 January 1919 – 20 March 2017) was a Danish librarian who specialized in promoting literature for children and young people. As a public library inspector, she was instrumental in bringing about administrative and legislative changes leading to more active use of children's books in schools and libraries. Internationally, she chaired IFLA's committee for children's libraries (1965–1971) and in 1966 became Denmark's representative on the International Board on Books for Young People.

== Early life and education ==
Born on 20 January 1919, in Hillerød, Bredsdorff was the daughter of the haulier Hjalmar Dilling Larsen (1892–1972) and Jessie Petra Marie Thomsen (1893–1987). After matriculating from Frederiksborg Latin School, she served an apprenticeship with Copenhagen Libraires becoming a librarian in 1944. During the German occupation of Denmark, she was active in the Danish resistance as a member of Frit Danmark's libraries group.

== Career ==
Bredsdorff quickly began to specialize in children's books, working together with Helga Mollerup (1900–1984) who shared her interest. After furthering her education in the area of children's libraries, she was appointed deputy head of Copenhagen Libraries in 1948. A talented administrator, she headed the Danish Library Association's Children's Literature Committee (1954–1964) and chaired the committee for Children's Book Week in 1966 and 1971.

From 1957, Bredsdorff served the Danish National Library Authority as a consultant on children's libraries. As a result of her administrative expertise, in 1965 she was promoted to the position of public libraries inspector, an appointment which until then has been reserved for men. She held the position until 1981, teaching children's librarianship at the Danish Library School in parallel.

Bredsdorff served on a number of national and international committees, including IFLA and the International Board on Books for Young People, and contributed to journals such as Library Service to Children and IFLA Journal. In 1959, she contributed a chapter on "Børne- og skolebiblioteksarbejde" (Work in children's and school libraries) in Lærebog i biblioteksteknik (Textbook on Library Techniques).

== Personal life ==
On 20 March 1940, Bredsdorff married her librarian colleague Viggo Vilhelm Bredsdorff (1918–2000) with whom she had two sons. After her retirement in 1981, together with her husband she undertook valuable voluntary work for Amnesty International.

Bredsdorff died on 24 August 2017, aged 98.
