= Asa (railway station) =

Railway station

General information
- Other names: Assa
- Location: Kazakhstan
- Coordinates: 43°02′02″N 71°08′31″E
- Operator: Kazakhstan Temir Zholy

Construction
- Parking: Available

Other information
- Status: Functioning
- Station code: 70670

History
- Opened: 1946
Location

Asa or Assa (Kazakh: Аса) is a railway station in Jambyl Region, Kazakhstan. It is used for freight trains.
