= Asa River (Japan) =

River in Tokyo, Japan

Coordinates: 35°39′44″N 139°25′58″E

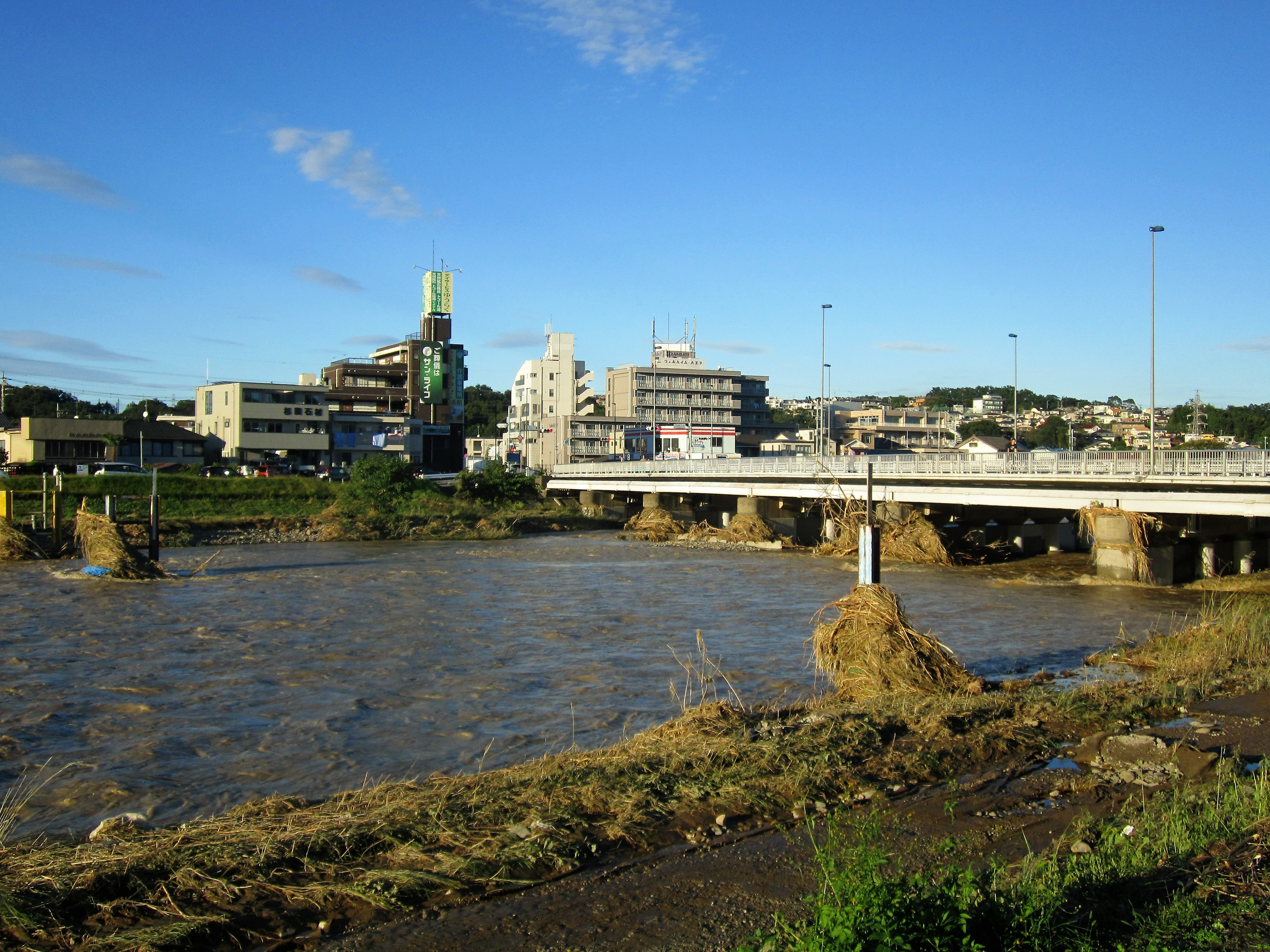

- Location within Japan

The Asa River (浅川, Asa-kawa) is a tributary of the Tama River in Tokyo, Japan. It is 30.15 km long, flowing from mountains in Hachiōji to the Tama in the city of Hino.
