= ASA Aluminium Body =

- Company type: Private
- Industry: Automotive
- Founded: 1969; 57 years ago
- Headquarters: Don Torcuato, Argentina
- Key people: Néstor Salerno (founder and owner)
- Products: Automobile
- Owner: Néstor Salerno
- Website: nestorsalerno.com

ASA Aluminium Body is an Argentinian company that produces exact re-builds of racing cars from the 1930s, 1940s and 1950s. The company is headquartered in Don Torcuato, a city in Tigre Partido.

== History ==
In 1969 a company named Lotus Argentina started producing licensed Lotus Seven roadsters. In 1985 Néstor Salerno, an Argentinian racing driver, bought the company, changing its name to ASA ("Automóvil Sport Argentino").

== Current models ==
The company offers standard replicas of Lotus Seven and Porsche 550. Also offered are special order replicas of cars like: Maserati 300S, Lancia D24, Ferrari 375 MM, Alfa Romeo 3000 CM, Frazer Nash Le Mans and other racing cars from the period. All of the cars have aluminium bodies.
