= Aase Gulbrandsen =

Norwegian painter and graphic artist (1927–2020)

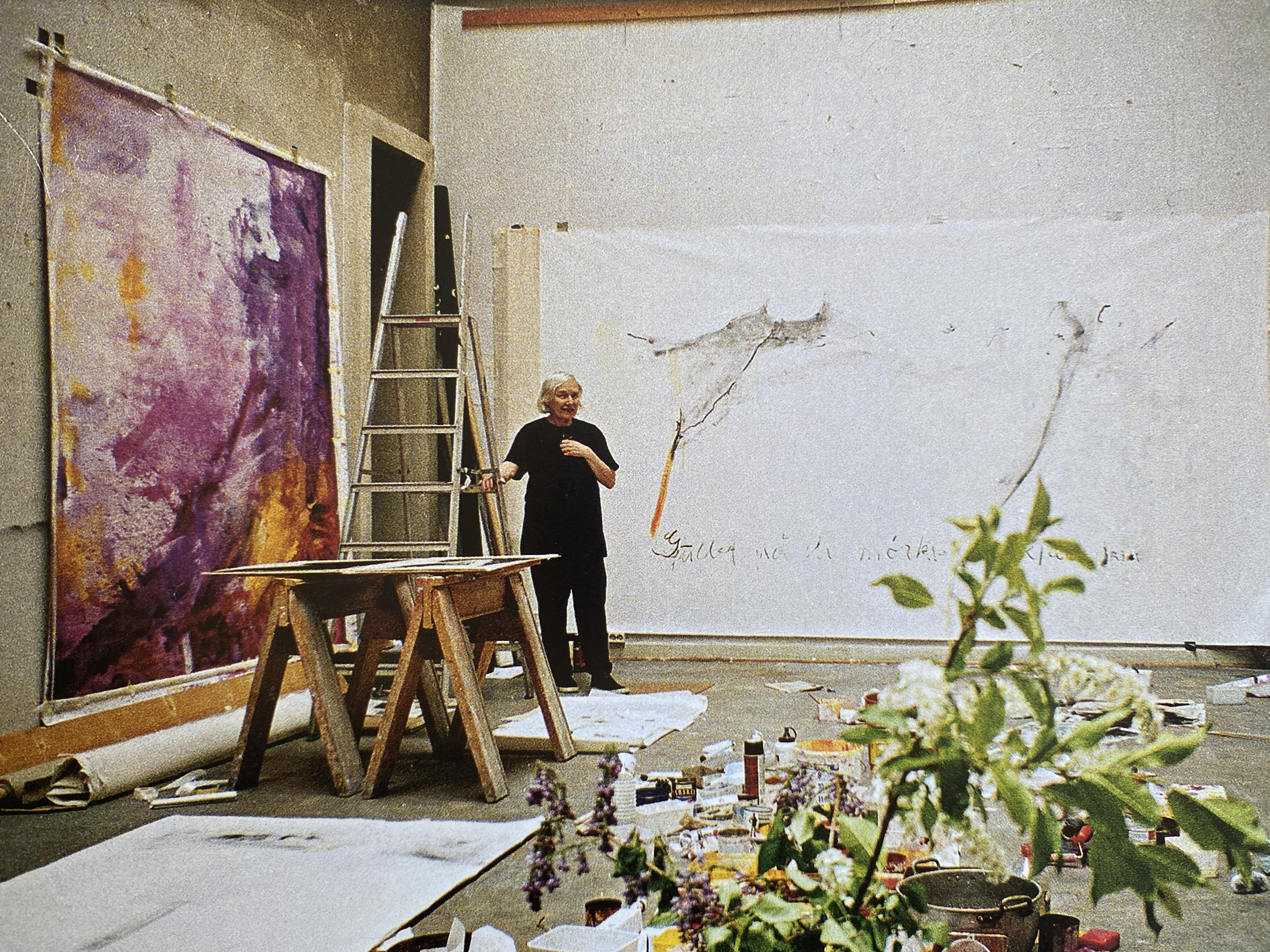
- Aase Gulbrandsen in her studio in Oslo City Hall
- Born: 26 May 1927; Oslo, Norway
- Died: 11 April 2020 (aged 92); Oslo, Norway
- Known for: Graphic artist, painting

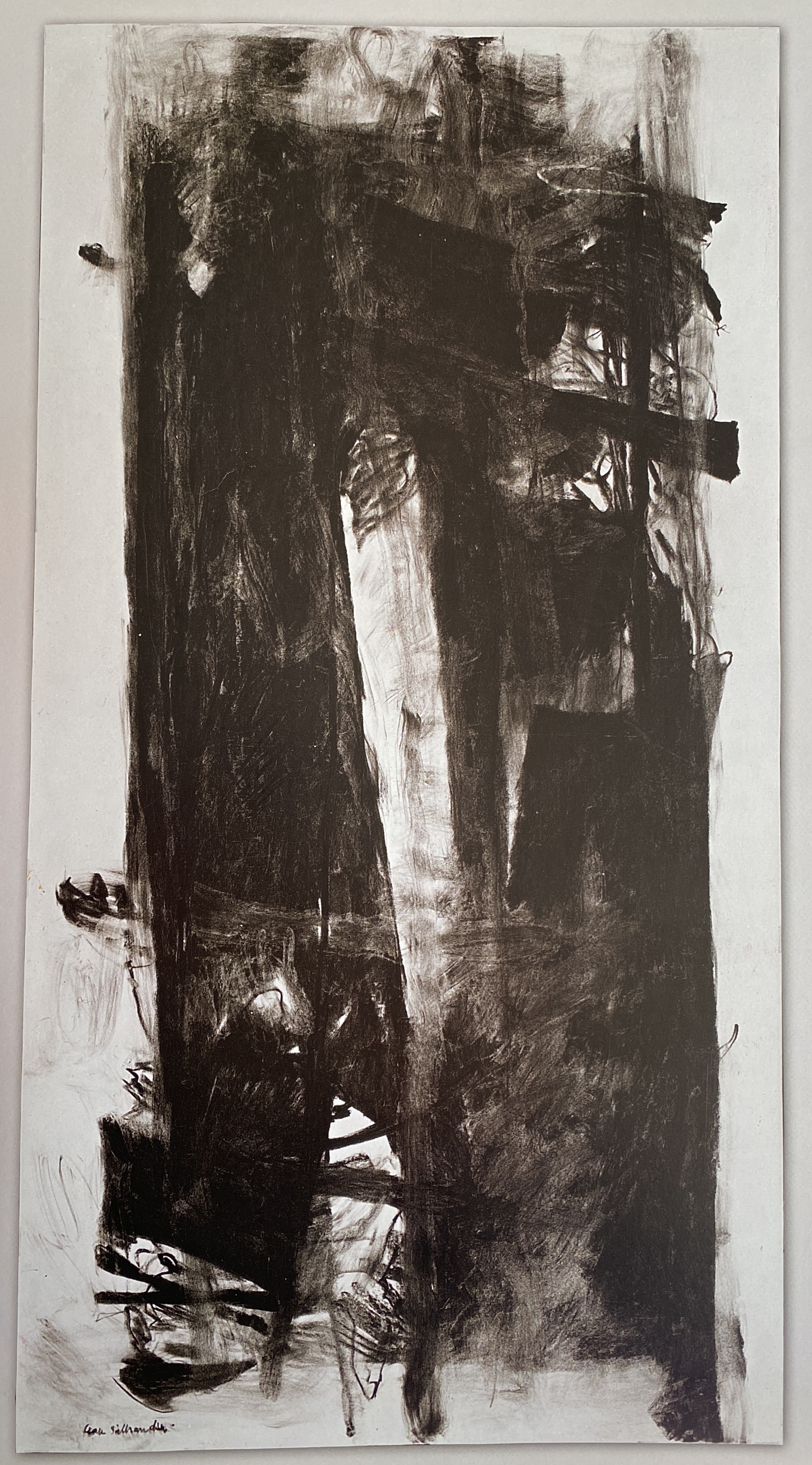
Aase Gulbrandsen, charcoal drawing. Oslo Concert Hall, 1979.

Aase Gulbrandsen (26 May 1927 – 11 April 2020) was a Norwegian painter and graphic artist.

She employed a variety of techniques, including charcoal, graphite pencils, oil paint, pastels, and lithography. Her breakthrough came during a solo exhibition at Oslo Kunstforening in 1974, showing charcoal art that was quite unlike anything seen before.

In the course of her career, she held more than twenty solo exhibitions, in addition to participating in a number of group exhibitions in Norway and abroad. Her graphite work had a formative influence on the art of drawing in Norway. She was also a distinct colorist, not least because of the signature red of her oil paintings and pastels.

Gulbrandsen was awarded several grants and in 1977 she became one of the first to receive career-long support from the Norwegian Government Grant for Artists. From 1991 to 1996, she had her studio in one of Oslo City Hall’s towers, before moving on to the artists’ community at Frysja Art Centre. She was a regular resident at Cité internationale des arts in Paris.

In 2007 she released a critically acclaimed artist’s book, Så merkelig (How Strange, published by Forlaget Press).

Gulbrandsen’s art is held in a number of public and private collections, including Fonds national d'art contemporain in France, The National Gallery in Norway and the Norwegian Museum of Contemporary Art.
