= Elwood Staffing =

American business

- Type: Privately Held
- Industry: Staffing Services
- Founded: 1980
- Headquarters: Columbus, Indiana
- Number of locations: 320+ service locations in 40 states
- Areas served: United States
- Key people: John A. Elwood (CEO), Diane Bohman (President), Michael D. Elwood (Principal), Mark S. Elwood (Chairman of the Board) David L. Elwood (founder)
- Services: Employment Agency, Temporary Employment, Staffing, Human Resources, Recruitment
- Number of employees: 945 (2022)
- Website: www.elwoodstaffing.com

Elwood Staffing is a privately owned corporation offering services in temporary staffing, temporary-to-hire staffing, contract staffing, direct placement staffing, and payrolling services. Headquartered in Columbus, Indiana, Elwood Staffing operates offices throughout the United States. Elwood's services match job seekers with employment.

== History ==
In 1980, David L. Elwood, Ph.D., founded Elwood Consulting in Columbus, Indiana, initially providing pre-employment testing and employee opinion surveys to complement his private psychology practice. Throughout the late 1980s and early 1990s, the company expanded its services to include interviewing, skills testing, drug screening, and other hiring-support functions in response to client needs. In 1994, Elwood began offering temporary staffing services and formally adopted its five core beliefs: Quality, Progress, Responsiveness, Flexibility, and Relationships. After incorporating as Elwood Consulting Company, Inc. in 1995, the firm reached $1 million in sales by 1996. In 1997, the company rebranded as Elwood Staffing to better reflect its primary focus on staffing services. Since 2001, Elwood Staffing has pursued significant growth through strategic acquisitions, including the 2013 acquisition of SOS Employment Group, which substantially expanded its national footprint. In 2023 and 2024, Elwood Staffing acquired IES Custom Staffing Solutions, Advanced Personnel, NAOS Staffing, and BelFlex Staffing Network, expanding its footprint across the West, Midwest, and Southeast. In late 2026, Elwood acquired CoWorx Staffing Services, a New Jersey-based national workforce solutions provider with 45 locations across 21 states, expanding the company's footprint into five new Eastern states. Elwood employs approximately 1,000 permanent, full-time employees, operates more than 320 service locations in 40 states, and generates approximately $900 million in annual revenue.

Elwood is the nation's 8th largest industrial staffing firm and the 31st largest overall staffing firm operating in the country. In terms of individuals and companies served, Elwood's size equates to employment of approximately 25,000 temporary associates daily and staffing partnerships with more than 6,000 client companies annually.

== Divisions ==
Elwood Staffing is divided into three business lines: Elwood Staffing, Elwood Professional, and Elwood Tradesmen.

=== Elwood Staffing ===
Elwood Staffing offers temporary, temporary-to-hire, contract, and direct hire positions in a variety of areas: administrative & clerical, customer service, manufacturing & production, and warehouse & distribution.

=== Elwood Professional ===
Elwood Professional is the division of Elwood Staffing for the recruitment and placement of engineering, information technology, and business management professionals in mid-level, VP, and executive openings.

=== Elwood Tradesmen ===
Elwood Tradesmen is the division of Elwood Staffing that provides contingent workers for the commercial construction, manufacturing, energy, and data center industries.
