= Japra, India =

Japra
- Populated place
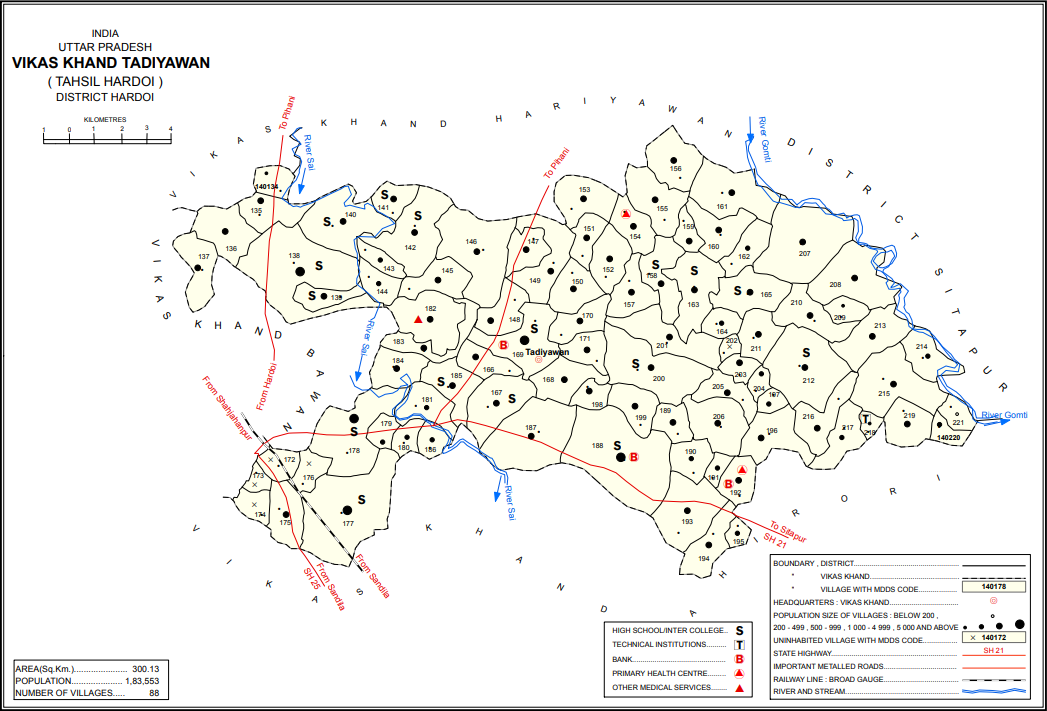
- Map showing Japra (#146) in Tadiyawan CD block

- Location in Uttar Pradesh, India Japra (India)
- Coordinates: 27.47336°N 80.229879°E
- Country: India
- State: Uttar Pradesh
- District: Hardoi

Area
  - Total: 6.623 km^{2} (2.557 sq mi)

Population (2011)
  - Total: 3,633
  - Density: 548.5/km^{2} (1,421/sq mi)

Languages
  - Official: Hindi
- Time zone: UTC+5:30 (IST)

Japra is a village in Tadiyawan block of Hardoi district, Uttar Pradesh, India. Located 16 km from the city of Hardoi, the village is not on any major roads and it has 3 primary schools but no healthcare facilities. The main staple foods are wheat and rice. As of 2011, the population of Japra is 3,633, in 555 households.

== Demographic history ==
The 1961 census recorded Japra as comprising 7 hamlets, with a total population of 1,497 (798 male and 699 female), in 293 households and 183 physical houses. The area of the village was given as 1,678 acres.

The 1981 census recorded Japra as having a population of 1,968, in 235 households, and covering an area of 679.09 hectares.
