= Asa, Hardoi =

Asa Āsa
- Populated place
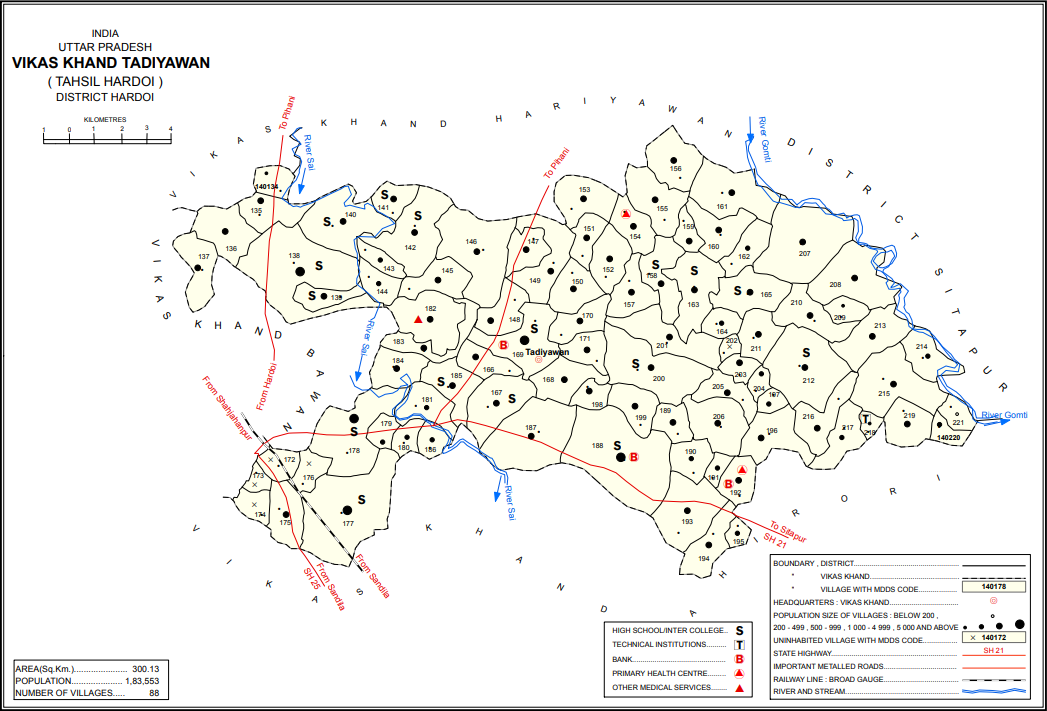
- Map showing Asa (#178) in Tadiyawan CD block

- Location in Uttar Pradesh, India Asa (India)
- Coordinates: 27.396007°N 80.181357°E
- Country: India
- State: Uttar Pradesh
- District: Hardoi

Area
  - Total: 8.093 km^{2} (3.125 sq mi)

Population (2011)
  - Total: 5,734
  - Density: 708.5/km^{2} (1,835/sq mi)

Languages
  - Official: Hindi
- Time zone: UTC+5:30 (IST)

Asa is a village in Tadiyawan block of Hardoi district, Uttar Pradesh, India. Located 3 km from the city of Hardoi, the village is connected to state highways and has several schools but no healthcare facilities. The main staple foods are wheat and rice. As of 2011, the population of Asa is 5,734, in 944 households.

== Demographic history ==
The 1961 census recorded Asa as comprising 10 hamlets, with a total population of 1,806 (974 male and 832 female), in 364 households and 267 physical houses. The area of the village was given as 2,002 acres.
