= Åsa =

Åsa may refer to:

== Given name ==
- Åsa Haraldsdottir of Agder (c. 800 – c. 850), Norwegian queen and regent
- Åsa Andersson (born 1971), Swedish politician
- Åsa Domeij (born 1962), former politician for the Swedish Green Party
- Åsa Eriksson (politician) (born 1972), Swedish politician
- Åsa Karlsson (born 1973), Swedish politician
- Åsa Kullgren (born 1971), Swedish politician
- Åsa Larsson (born 1966), Swedish crime-fiction writer
- Åsa Mogensen (born 1972 as Åsa Eriksson), Swedish former handball player
- Åsa Regnér (born 1964), Swedish politician
- Åsa Romson (born 1972), Swedish politician
- Åsa Sandell (born 1967), Swedish journalist and former boxer
- Åsa Svedmark (born 1961), Swedish alpine skier
- Åsa Svensson (born 1975), Swedish tennis player
- Åsa Westlund (born 1976), Swedish politician

== Other uses ==
- Åsa, Kungsbacka, Halland County, Sweden
  - Åsa IF, a Swedish football club based in Åsa
- Åsa, Ringerike, Buskerud, Norway, a village

== See also ==
- Aasa (disambiguation)
- Asa (disambiguation)
- Åse (disambiguation), the Norwegian version of the name
