= Åse Fosli =

Norwegian politician

Åse Fosli (8 June 1924 – 1 June 2009) was a Norwegian politician for the Conservative Party.

She served as a deputy representative to the Parliament of Norway from Troms during the terms 1977–1981 and 1981–1985. In total she met during 8 days of parliamentary session.
