= Westaff =

Staffing company in California, US

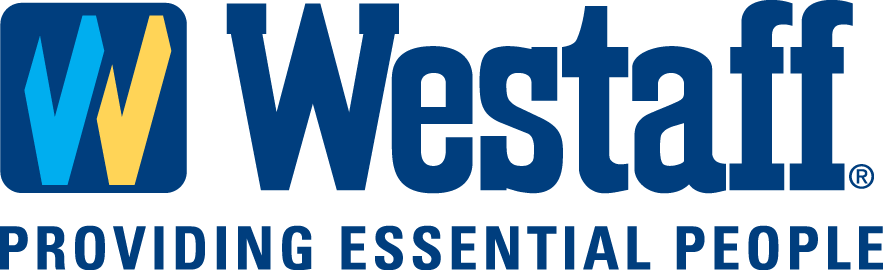
- Company type: Subsidiary
- Industry: Employment agency
- Founded: 1948; 78 years ago
- Founder: Robert W. Stover
- Headquarters: Santa Barbara, California
- Area served: United States
- Parent: EmployBridge
- Website: westaff.com

Westaff is a staffing company based in Santa Barbara, California, United States, with more than 75 franchises located throughout the United States. Westaff is a wholly owned division of EmployBridge.

== Overview ==
Westaff provides workers for administrative, clerical, light industrial, and technology positions and offers temporary, temp-to-hire, and full-time placement services. It has more than 75 offices, including some at customers' facilities. None of Westaff's offices are company-owned; all offices are operated as franchises. Most of the offices are in rural and suburban areas. Westaff operates throughout the US, principally in the East, South, and Midwest. Robert W. Stover founded the staffing firm in 1948.

== Timeline ==
- 1948: Western Employers Service, the first temporary staffing service on the West Coast, is founded by W. Robert Stover.
- 1958: Western Employers Service becomes Western Girl, Inc.
- 1963: Light Industrial Division begins operation.
- 1964-66: First international office opens in Mexico City, followed by offices in Denmark, Norway, Australia, and the United Kingdom.
- 1967: Western Medical Services is established.
- 1973: Western Girl is renamed Western Temporary Services.
- 1980: First office in Switzerland opens.
- 1984: Franchise Sales Program is launched.
- 1985: First office in New Zealand opens.
- 1987: Western Temporary opens its 300th office.
- 1990: Western Medical Services begins licensing offices as home health agencies.
- 1994: Western Temporary Services becomes Western Staff Services.
- 1996: Western Staff's initial public offering is effective April 30.
- 1997: Western Staff makes 16 acquisitions in the United States, Australia, and New Zealand.
- 1998: Western Staff Services becomes Westaff.
- 1999: Westaff sells its subsidiary Western Medical Services.
- 2009: The Select Family of Staffing Companies (now known as EmployBridge) acquired Westaff in March.
