= Hannah Caroline Aase =

American botanist and cytologist (1883-1980)

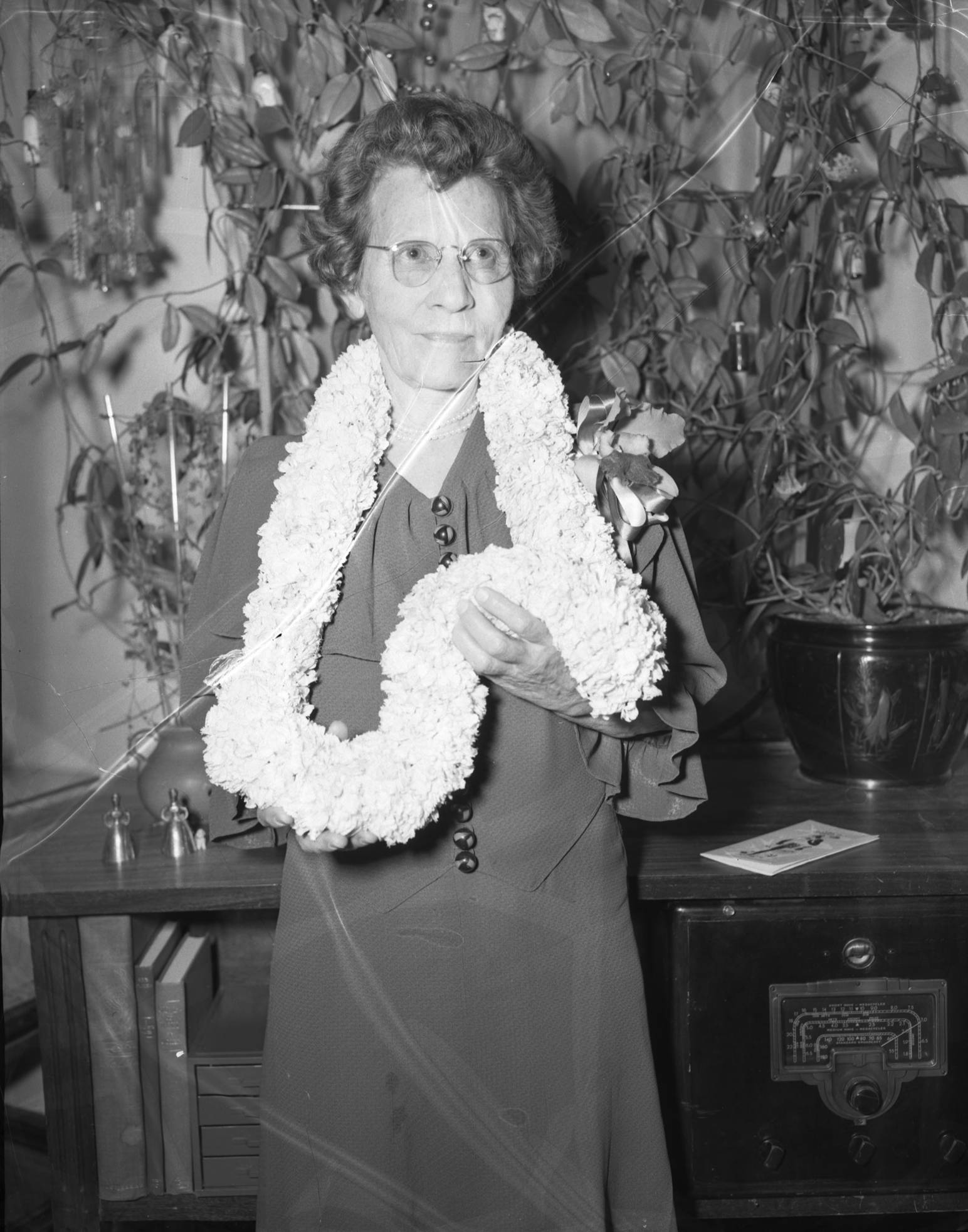
- Hannah Aase, October 1949 (WSU Libraries pc001ng03n04017)
- Born: July 12, 1883
- Died: November 23, 1980 (aged 97)
- Education: University of Chicago
- Known for: Allium aaseae, Aase's Onion
- Scientific career
- Fields: Botany, Cytology
- Institutions: State College of Washington
- Author abbrev. (botany): Aase

Hannah Caroline Aase (July 12, 1883 – November 23, 1980) was an American botanist and cytologist.

== Career ==
Aase received a Bachelor of Arts from the University of South Dakota in 1906 and a graduate degree from South Dakota State College in 1928. In 1915, she received a PhD from the University of Chicago. In her 1915 dissertation, she studied the vascular anatomy of the megasporophylls of conifers. She found that plants in the Coniferales family generally reduce the number of sporophylls in the strobilus and a modified compound sporophyll appears later in disguised forms but loses one of the sporophyll members.

She became an instructor of botany at the State College of Washington in 1914 and taught morphology. She was a member of the faculty until 1949 and the first emeritus professor.

She later studied the heredity of cereal grains. She crossed wheat with wild relatives in the 1930s and seems to have wanted to understand the ancestry of wheat, but much of her work has been lost.

She often co-authored papers on Allium aaseae, Aase's Onion, with Francis Marion Ownbey, a fellow faculty member at WSU. After her retirement, she continued in the field by reading technical journals. Washington State University has honored her legacy with the Aase Fellowship in Botany which used in the recruitment of new graduate students.

The standard author abbreviation Aase is used to indicate this person as the author when citing a botanical name.

== Eponyms ==
Allium aaseae - Aase's Onion

== Selected publications ==
=== Books ===
- Aase, Hannah Caroline. Vascular Anatomy of the Megasporophylls of Conifers (1915). The Botanical Gazette
- Aase, Hannah Caroline and Gaines, Edward Franklin. To haploid wheat plant. Number 6 of Contribution (1926). State College of Washington. Dept. of Botany. Edition reimpresa of College of Agriculture and Exp. Sta. 13 pp.
- Aase, Hannah Caroline. Cytology of Triticum, Secale, and Aegilops hybrids, with reference to phylogeny (1930). Editor State College of Washington, 60 pp.
- Aase, Hannah Caroline and Ownbey, Francis Marion. Cytotaxonomic studies in Allium (1955). Number 1-3 of Research studies of the State College of Washington: Monographic supplement. Editor State College of Washington, 106 pp.
