= Attorney-General of Singapore =

Public prosecutor and legal advisor to the government of Singapore

Attorney-General of the Republic of Singapore
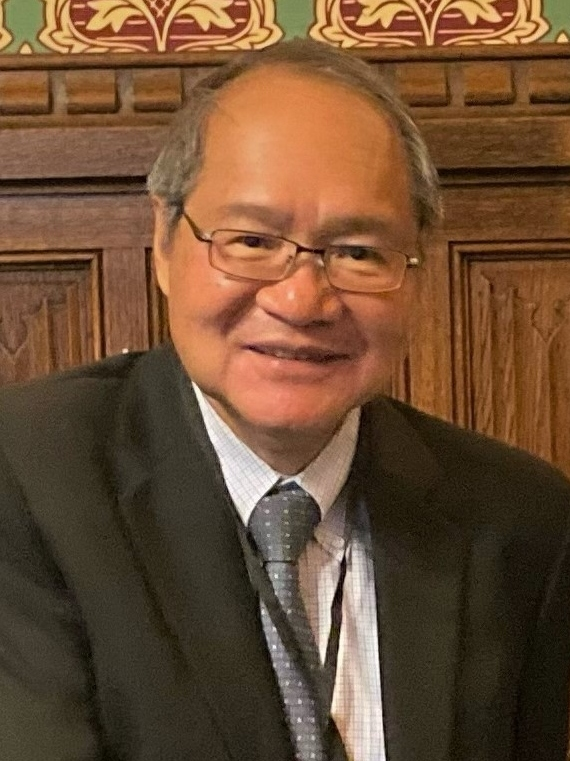
- Incumbent; Lucien Wong since 14 January 2017
- Attorney-General's Chambers
- Style: Attorney-General (informal); The Honourable (formal)
- Nominator: Prime Minister of Singapore
- Appointer: President of Singapore
- Term length: Tenure until the age of 60
- Constituting instrument: Constitution of Singapore, Article 35(1)
- Inaugural holder: Ahmad Mohamed Ibrahim
- Formation: 9 August 1965; 61 years ago
- Deputy: Deputy Attorney-General; Solicitor-General
- Website: www.agc.gov.sg

The attorney-general of Singapore is the public prosecutor of the Republic of Singapore and legal adviser to the Government of Singapore. The attorney-general is the head of the Attorney-General's Chambers (AGC), whose staff carries out the functions of the attorney-general. The attorney-general is appointed by the president, on the advice of the prime minister, under Article 35 of the Constitution of Singapore. Unlike some countries that follow the Westminster parliamentary model, the attorney-general is not a Member of Parliament.

The Office of Attorney-General was established in 1867, when the British Crown appointed the attorney-general of the Straits Settlements, based in Singapore, to serve as legal adviser to the new Crown colony's government.

== Functions ==
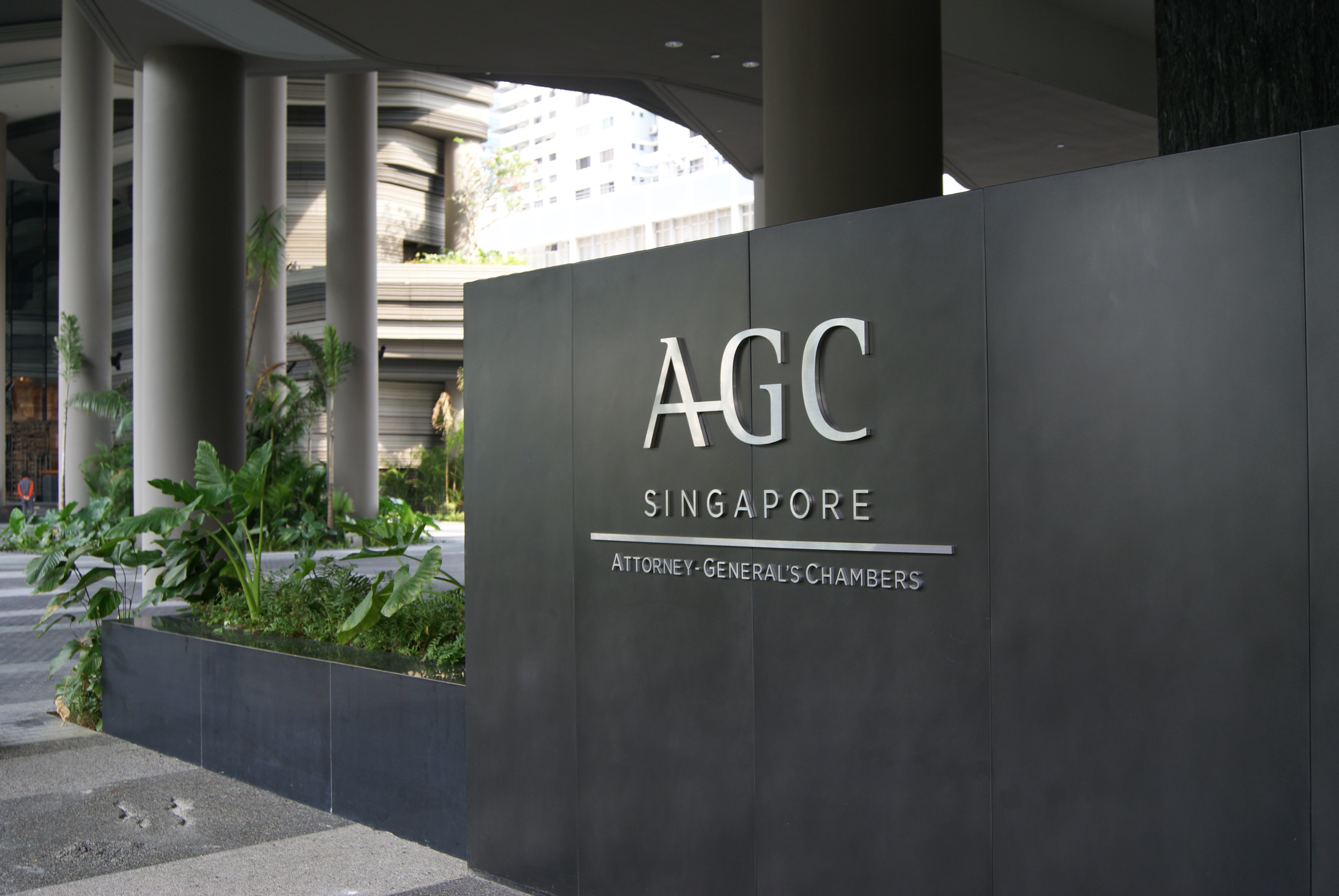
The Attorney-General's Chambers' offices at 1 Pickering Street, its home since 2013.

The attorney-general of Singapore has two distinct roles: legal adviser to the Singapore Government and public prosecutor, assisted by legal officers in the four divisions of the Attorney-General's Chambers (AGC).

=== Legal adviser to the government ===
The attorney-general's role as the Government's legal adviser is performed by the AGC's Civil Division. The functions of the attorney-general include advising ministries and organs of state on legal matters; drafting and vetting contracts and legal documents; and representing the Government in international initiatives and litigation matters, among others.

The International Affairs Division advises Government agencies on international-law issues, represents Singapore in bilateral and multilateral negotiations, and negotiates and drafts multilateral and bilateral legal instruments, among other roles.

The Legislation Division comprises four groups. The Law Drafting Group drafts legislation and advises Government agencies on development of legislation. The Legislative Editorial and Revision Group undertakes law revision. The Law Publication Group maintains Singapore Statutes Online, among other duties. The Business Services and Governance Group provides administrative support to the other groups.

=== Public Prosecutor ===
The attorney-general's role as the public prosecutor is performed by the AGC's Crime Division. Prosecutorial discretion grants the attorney-general the power to institute, conduct or discontinue any prosecution at the attorney-general's discretion.

== History ==
=== Pre-1867 ===
Between the grant of the Second Charter of Justice in 1826 and the formation of the Crown colony of the Straits Settlements in 1867, the function of legal adviser to the government in Singapore was vested in various offices. From 1826 to 1855, it was the Recorder of the Prince of Wales Island, Malacca and Singapore; from 1855 to 1864, the Recorder of Singapore; and from 1864 to 1867, the Crown Counsel, Singapore.

=== 1867–1942: Attorney-General of the Straits Settlements ===
The office of Attorney-General was created on 1 April 1867, when Sir Thomas Braddell was appointed as the first attorney-general of the Straits Settlements. He was based in Singapore while his solicitor-general, Daniel Logan, was based in Penang.

=== 1942–1945: Japanese occupation of Singapore ===
Following the fall of Singapore on 15 February 1942, Japanese troops arrested the attorney-general, Charles Gough Howell, KC, who died in Japanese captivity. Concurrently, the civilian courts ceased to function.

Subsequently, the Japanese military administration established the office of Kensatsu-kan, or Attorney-General and Public Prosecutor, presumably on 27 May 1942 when the civilian courts were re-opened by proclamation.

=== 1945–1946: British Military Administration ===
Following the formal surrender of Japanese forces in Southeast Asia on 12 September 1945, the responsibility of rendering legal advice to the British Military Administration of Malaya lay with its Chief Legal Officer.

=== 1946–1959: Attorney-General of the Colony of Singapore ===
When Singapore became a Crown colony on 1 April 1946, Sir Edward John Davies, KC was appointed as the first attorney-general of the Colony of Singapore.

=== 1959–1965: State Advocate-General of the State of Singapore ===
After the State of Singapore gained full internal self-governance in 1959, Ahmad Mohamed Ibrahim was appointed State Advocate-General, becoming Singapore's first non-British legal adviser to the government.

=== Post-1965: Attorney-General of the Republic of Singapore ===
Following the Republic of Singapore's independence on 9 August 1965, Ahmad Mohamed Ibrahim became the country's first attorney-general.

The appointment of Lucien Wong, SC, as the ninth attorney-general, was debated in Parliament. He was aged 63 at the time of his appointment. Article 35(4) of the Constitution provides that the Attorney-General shall vacate office upon attaining the age of 60, and his predecessor had retired upon reaching that age. Wong was subsequently reappointed for a three-year term from 14 January 2026 to 13 January 2029.

In 2026, during the Ministry of Law's Committee of Supply debate, Workers' Party MP Sylvia Lim described the constitutional process for appointing the Attorney-General as "thin" and called for greater transparency about how candidates are selected for the role. Law Minister Edwin Tong countered by stating that the appointment process is neither thin nor perfunctory and involves consultation with the Chief Justice, the chairman of the Public Service Commission, and the Council of Presidential Advisers before the Prime Minister advises the President, and arguing that making such deliberations public "risks politicising an office that must remain scrupulously non-partisan".

Prior to his appointment, Wong had been the personal lawyer of Prime Minister Lee Hsien Loong; in that capacity, he advised Lee on issues relating to the will of his father Lee Kuan Yew.

== List of officeholders (1867–1965) ==
=== Attorney-General of the Straits Settlements ===
#	Attorney-General of the Straits Settlements	Took office	Left office
1	Thomas Braddell	1 April 1867	1 January 1883
–	John Augustus Harwood (acting)	2 January 1883	2 October 1883
2	John Winfield Bonser	3 October 1883	6 November 1893
3	William Robert Collyer	7 November 1893	4 February 1906
–	John Robert Innes (acting)	5 February 1906	28 February 1907
4	Walter John Napier	1 March 1907	31 December 1909
5	Frederick Belfield	1 January 1910	20 February 1911
6	Thomas de Multon Lee Braddell	21 February 1911	24 January 1913
–	Evelyn Campbell Ellis (acting)	25 January 1913	24 April 1913
7	Gerald Aubrey Goodman	25 April 1913	18 November 1919
8	James William Murison	19 November 1919	9 July 1925
9	Michael Whitley	10 July 1925	12 July 1929
10	Walter Huggard	13 July 1929	20 April 1933
11	Percy Alexander McElwaine	21 April 1933	10 August 1936
–	Newnham Arthur Worley (acting)	27 October 1936	10 December 1936
12	Charles Gough Howell	11 August 1936	14 February 1942

=== Kensatsu-kan of Syonan-to ===
#	Kensatsu-kan of Syonan-to	Term start	Term end
–	–	15 February 1942	26 May 1942
1	Ichihara Kakka	27 May 1942	11 September 1945

=== Chief Legal Officer, British Military Administration of Malaya ===
#	Chief Legal Officer, British Military Administration	Took office	Left office
1	Lieutenant Colonel T. C. Spencer-Wilkinson	12 September 1945	31 March 1946

=== Attorney-General of the Crown Colony of Singapore ===
#	Attorney-General of the Crown Colony of Singapore	Took office	Left office
1	Sir John Davies, KC	1 April 1946	5 September 1955
2	Charles Harris Butterfield, QC	6 September 1955	1 July 1957
3	Ernest Pattison Shanks, QC	2 July 1957	24 June 1959

=== State Advocate-General of the State of Singapore ===
#	State Advocate-General of the State of Singapore	Took office	Left office	Previous office	Subsequent office
1	Ahmad Mohamed Ibrahim	25 June 1959	8 August 1965	Crown Counsel and Deputy Public Prosecutor	Attorney-General of Singapore

== List of attorneys-general (1965–present) ==
#	Attorney-General of the Republic of Singapore	Took office	Left office	Previous office	Subsequent office
1	Ahmad Mohamed Ibrahim	9 August 1965	31 January 1967	State Advocate-General of Singapore	Ambassador to the United Arab Republic
–	Tan Boon Teik (acting)	1 February 1967	31 December 1968	–	–
2	Tan Boon Teik, SC	1 January 1969	30 April 1992	Solicitor-General of Singapore	Chairman, Singapore International Arbitration Centre
3	Chan Sek Keong, SC	1 May 1992	10 April 2006	Judge of the Supreme Court of Singapore	Chief Justice of Singapore
4	Chao Hick Tin, SC	11 April 2006	10 April 2008	Judge of the Court of Appeal of Singapore	Judge of the Court of Appeal of Singapore
5	Walter Woon, SC	11 April 2008	10 April 2010	Solicitor-General of Singapore	Professor, National University of Singapore Faculty of Law
–	Koh Juat Jong, SC (acting)	11 April 2010	30 September 2010	Solicitor-General of Singapore	Solicitor-General of Singapore
6	Sundaresh Menon, SC	1 October 2010	24 June 2012	Managing Partner, Rajah & Tann	Judge of the Court of Appeal of Singapore
7	Steven Chong, SC	25 June 2012	24 June 2014	Judge of the Supreme Court of Singapore	Judge of the Supreme Court of Singapore
8	V. K. Rajah, SC	25 June 2014	13 January 2017	Judge of the Court of Appeal of Singapore	Retired
9	Lucien Wong, SC	14 January 2017	Incumbent	Chairman and Senior Partner, Allen & Gledhill	–

== Notable incidents ==
=== Wrongful conviction ===
In September 2020, the AGC conducted a prosecutorial review for a wrongful conviction case of a domestic worker accused of a crime.

=== Letters of prisoners on death row ===
On 11 October 2024, the Court of Appeal ruled that the Singapore Prison Service and AGC had acted unlawfully by disclosing and requesting letters written by prisoners on death row.

== See also ==
- Chief Justice of Singapore

== Bibliography ==
- Braddell, R. St.J (1983). The Law of the Straits Settlements: A Commentary. South East Asia: Oxford University Press. ISBN 0195825594.
