= Charles Harris Butterfield =

British lawyer and colonial official (1911–2008)

Charles Harris Butterfield KC
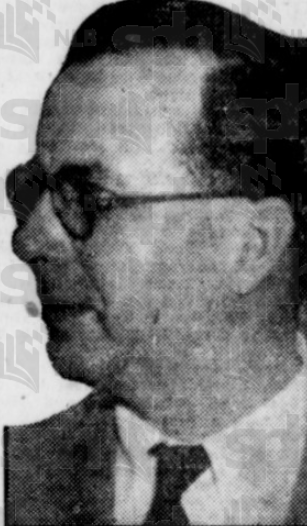
- Butterfield from a 1954 publication

Attorney-General of Singapore
- In office 1955–1957
- Preceded by: Sir John Davies
- Succeeded by: Ernest Pattison Shanks

Personal details
- Born: 28 June 1911
- Died: 15 April 2008 (aged 96) Bexhill-on-Sea
- Children: 1 daughter
- Education: Trinity College, Cambridge

Charles Harris Butterfield (28 June 1911 – 15 April 2008) was a British lawyer who served as Attorney-General of Singapore from 1955 to 1957.

== Early life and education ==
Butterfield was born on 28 June 1911, the second son of William Arthur Butterfield, engineer (OBE). He was educated at Downside School and Trinity College, Cambridge. In 1934 he was called to the Bar by the Middle Temple.

== Career ==
Butterfield joined the Colonial Legal Service in 1938, and in the same year was appointed King's Counsel, Straits Settlements and Deputy Public Prosecutor. In 1941, he served in the Royal Regiment of Artillery (Volunteer), Singapore, and was incarcerated as a POW from 1942 to 1945.

Butterfield served as Solicitor-General of Singapore from 1948 to 1955. In 1951, he represented the government at the commission of enquiry into the Maria Hertogh riots in Singapore in which 18 people died. In 1954, he appeared in the public interest in the enquiry into the crash of a BOAC Lockheed Constellation at Kallang Airport, Singapore which killed 33 people. From 1955 to 1957, he served as Attorney-General of Singapore.

In 1959, he was appointed to the Legal Adviser’s Department of Commonwealth Relations Office (later the Foreign and Commonwealth Office), where he served until 1969, and from 1969 to 1974, he served at the Department of the Environment, and on the Secretary of State’s panel of inspectors at the Planning Department.

== Personal life and death ==
Butterfield married Monica Harrison in 1938 and they had a daughter. He later married Ellen Bennett.

Butterfield died on 15 April 2008 at Bexhill-on-Sea, aged 96.
