= Michael Whitley =

British colonial administrator (1872–1959)

Sir Michael Henry Whitley (26 September 1872 – 14 October 1959) was a British colonial administrator who became a senior judge and later Attorney General in the Straits Settlements.

== Education ==
Whitley was educated at Cranleigh School and then Blundell's School in Tiverton and read physics at King's College, London.

== Career ==
Whitley joined the civil service of the Federated Malay States in 1896 and was called to the Bar by the Inner Temple. In 1918 he was appointed a Puisne Judge of the Straits Settlements, where he remained until his appointment as Attorney-General of Singapore in 1925.

Whitley retired and became a knight bachelor in 1929. He returned to England and was made a Justice of the Peace for Hampshire.

== Sources ==
- Obituary of Sir Michael Whitley, The Times, 16 October 1959 (pg. 15; Issue 54593; col C)
- ”Death of Sir Michael Whitley reported”, The Straits Times, 24 February 1960
- Janus, Catalogue entries for Sir Michael Whitley from the photographic collection of the British Association of Malaysia and Singapore, Extracted 6 May, 2010
- Cranleigh School Register of Entries 1865-1890

Preceded by James William Murison	Attorney-General of Singapore; 1925 - 1929	Succeeded by Sir Walter Huggard
