= Herbert Cox =

Herbert Cox may refer to:

- Sir Herbert Vaughan Cox (1860–1923), Indian Army general
- Sir Herbert Cox (judge) (1893–1973), British barrister and colonial judge
- Herb Cox (born 1950/51), Canadian politician
