= Jousse =

Jousse may refer to:

- Joussé - a commune in Western France
- Marcel Jousse - French anthropologist and linguist
- Paul Jousse - South African trader
