= Bechuanaland Protectorate =

British protectorate in southern Africa

Coordinates: 24°S 25°E

- 1885–1966
- Flag Coat of arms
- Anthem: God Save the King/Queen
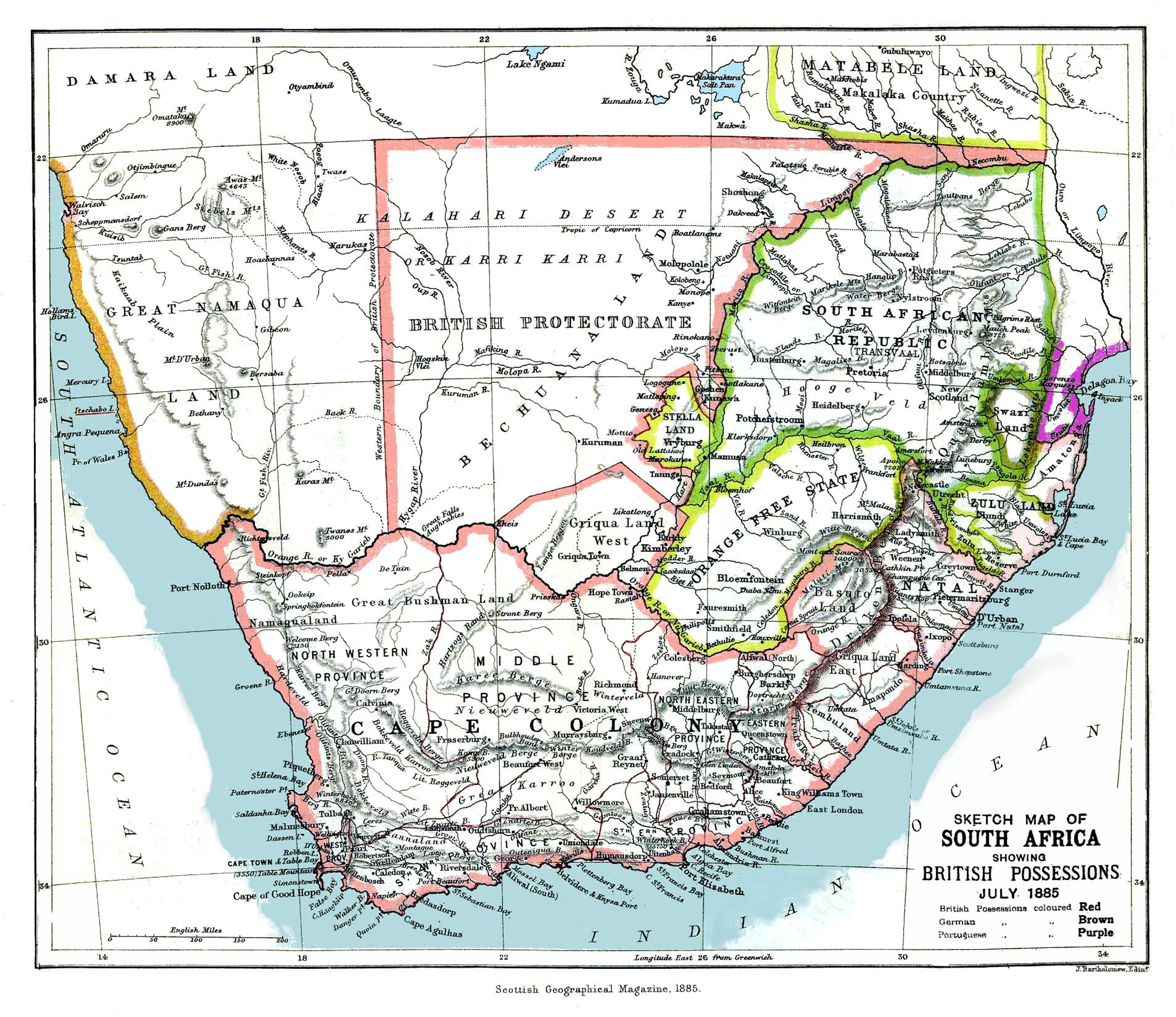
- 1885 map showing the Bechuanaland Protectorate prior to the creation of the crown colony of British Bechuanaland and the Heligoland–Zanzibar Treaty
- Status: Protectorate of the United Kingdom
- Capital: Mafikeng (1885–1965); Gaborone (1965–1966)
- Official languages: English
- Common languages: Setswana, IKalanga, widely spoken
- Religion: Congregationalism (Christian mission churches of the London Missionary Society/LMS); Anglicanism, Methodism, Badimo
- Monarch
  - 1885–1901: Victoria
  - 1901–1910: Edward VII
  - 1910–1936: George V
  - 1936: Edward VIII
  - 1936–1952: George VI
  - 1952–1966: Elizabeth II
- Commissioners
  - 1884–1885: John Mackenzie
  - 1965–1966: Hugh Norman-Walker
- Prime Minister
  - 1965–1966: Seretse Khama
- Legislature: Legislative Council
- Historical era: New Imperialism
  - Protectorate established: 31 March 1885
  - Expanded: 1890
  - General election: 1 March 1965
  - Independence: 30 September 1966

Area
- 1924: 712,000 km^{2} (275,000 sq mi)

Population
  - 1924: 152,980
- Currency: Pound sterling (1885–1961); South African rand (1961–1966)
Preceded by	Succeeded by
Tswana people	Botswana
- Today part of: Botswana; South Africa

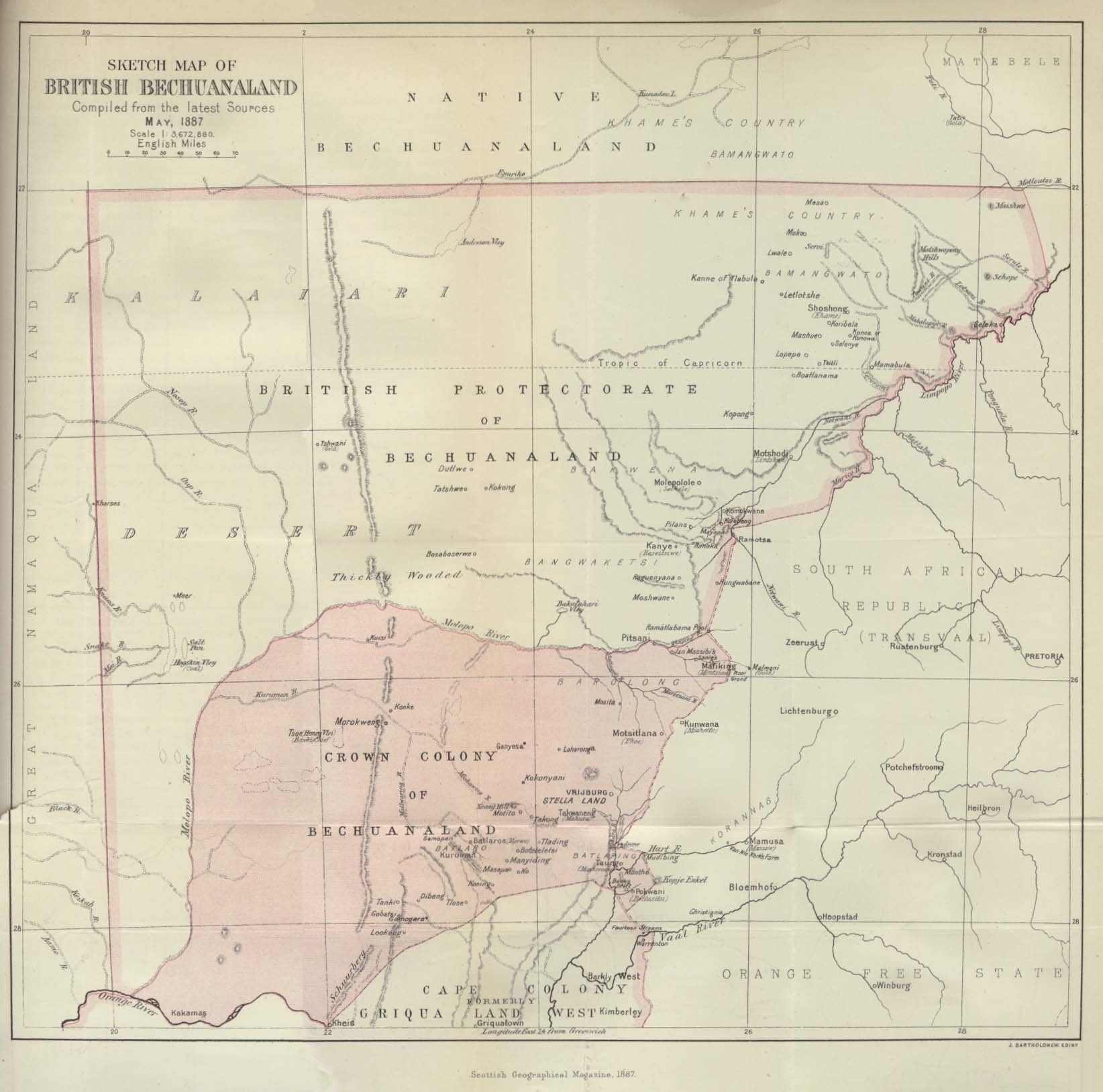
An 1887 map showing the Crown colony of Bechuanaland (shaded pink) and the Bechuanaland Protectorate (pink border). This was prior to the extension northward to include Ngamiland in 1890.

The Bechuanaland Protectorate (/ˌbɛtʃuˈɑːnəlænd/) was a protectorate established on 31 March 1885 in Southern Africa by the United Kingdom. It became independent as the Republic of Botswana on 30 September 1966, six years after the Bechuanaland Democratic Party was established, under the leadership of Seretse Khama.

== History ==
Scottish missionary John Mackenzie (1835–1899), sponsored by the London Missionary Society (LMS), lived at Shoshong from 1862 to 1876. He warned that African peoples were threatened by Boers encroaching on their territory from the south. He campaigned for the establishment of what became the Bechuanaland Protectorate, to be ruled directly from Britain. Austral Africa: Losing It or Ruling It (1887) is Mackenzie's account of events leading to the establishment of the protectorate. Influenced by Mackenzie, in January 1885 the British government decided to send a military expedition to South Africa to assert British sovereignty over the contested territory. Lieutenant Colonel Sir Charles Warren (1840–1927) led a force of 4,000 Imperial troops north from Cape Town. After making treaties with several African chiefs, Colonel Warren announced the establishment of the protectorate in March 1885. In September that year the Tswana country south of the Molopo River was proclaimed the Crown colony of British Bechuanaland. Mackenzie accompanied Warren, and Austral Africa contains a detailed account of the expedition.

Bechuanaland meant the "country of the Tswana" (from an archaic form of Batswana plus -land) and for administrative purposes was divided into two political entities. The northern part was administered as the Bechuanaland Protectorate and the southern part was administered as the crown colony of British Bechuanaland. British Bechuanaland was incorporated into the Cape Colony in 1895 and now forms part of South Africa.

The northern part, the Bechuanaland Protectorate, had an area of 225,000 square miles (580,000 km^{2}), and a population of 120,776. It comprised an area occupied by the three main Tswana peoples: the Bamangwato, the Bakwena and the Bangwaketse, together with a number of minor tribes like the Bamalete and the Bakhatla. Also living in the Protectorate were the descendants of the original inhabitants of the area, such as Bushmen and Makalaka, who had been dispossessed by the Tswana peoples in the course of their migration south.

The British government originally expected to turn over the administration of the protectorate to Rhodesia or South Africa, but Tswana opposition left the protectorate under British rule until its independence in 1966.

The Bechuanaland Protectorate was technically a protectorate rather than a colony. Originally the local Tswana rulers were left in power, and British administration was limited to the police force to protect Bechuanaland's borders against other European colonial ventures. But on 9 May 1891 the British Government gave the administration of the protectorate to the High Commissioner for Southern Africa, who started to appoint officials in Bechuanaland, and the de facto independence of Bechuanaland ended.

The protectorate was administered from Mafeking, creating an unusual situation, the capital of the territory being located outside of the territory. The area of Mafeking (from 1980 with its incorporation into Bophuthatswana as Mafikeng, and since 2010 as Mahikeng), was called 'The Imperial Reserve'. In 1885, when the protectorate was declared, Bechuanaland was bounded to the north by the latitude of 22° south. The northern boundary of the protectorate was formally extended northward by the British to include Ngamiland, which was then dominated by the Tawana state, on 30 June 1890. This claim was formally recognised by Germany the following day by Article III of the Heligoland-Zanzibar Treaty, which confirmed the western boundary of the British protectorate of Bechuanaland and the German protectorate of South-West Africa and also created the Caprivi strip inherited by modern Namibia:

In Southwest Africa, Germany's sphere of influence is demarcated thus:

1. To the south by the line that commences at the mouth of the Orange River and continues up its northern bank to its intersection point with the 20° east longitude.
2. To the east by the line that commences at the aforementioned point and follows the 20th degree of east longitude to its intersection point with the 22° south latitude. The line then traces this degree of latitude eastward to its intersection with the 21° east longitude, follows this degree of longitude northward to its intersection with the 18° south latitude, runs along this degree of latitude eastward to its intersection with the Chobe River. Here it descends the thalweg of the main channel until it meets the Zambezi, where it ends. It is understood that under this arrangement Germany shall be granted free access from its protectorate to the Zambezi by means of a strip of land not less than twenty English miles wide at any point. Great Britain's sphere of influence is bounded to the west and northwest by the previously described line and includes Lake Ngami.

British officials did not arrive in the Ngamiland region until 1894.

The Tati Concessions Land Act of 21 January 1911 transferred the new eastern territory to the protectorate:

From the place where the Shashe River rises to its junction with the Tati and Ramokgwebana Rivers, thence along the Ramokgwebana River to where it rises and thence along the watershed of those rivers,

This territory was originally claimed by Matabeleland. In 1887 Samuel Edwards, working for Cecil Rhodes, obtained a mining concession, and in 1895 the British South Africa Company attempted to acquire the area, but the Tswana chiefs Bathoen I, Khama III and Sebele I visited London to protest and were successful in fending off the BSAC. This territory forms the modern North-East District of Botswana.

Furthermore, Southern Bechuanaland was heavily affected by the 1890s African rinderpest epizootic which temporarily damaged the economy.

== Politics ==
The proclamation of a protectorate flanked by a new Crown colony to the south (British Bechuanaland) was primarily intended as a safeguard against further expansion by Germany, Portugal, or Boers.

Contrary to what was reported at the time by Warren and others, not all chiefs affected by the protectorate were in favour of it. The most powerful ruler was King Khama III, who had strong support from the British government, and was especially popular among evangelicals in Britain. He collaborated closely with the British military, and kept his vast, but underpopulated lands independent from intruders from South Africa.

Khama's eldest son, Sekgoma II, became chief of the Bamangwato upon Khama's death in 1923. Sekgoma II's eldest son was named Seretse. Throughout his life Khama was widowed and remarried several times. One wife, Semane, gave birth to a son named Tshekedi.

Sekgoma II's reign lasted only a year or so, leaving his son Seretse, who at the time was an infant, as the rightful heir to the chieftainship (Tshekedi was not in line to be chief since he did not descend from Khama's oldest son Sekgoma II). So in keeping with tradition, Tshekedi acted as regent of the tribe until Seretse was old enough to assume the chieftainship. The transfer of responsibility from Tshekedi to Seretse was planned to occur after Seretse had returned from his law studies overseas in Britain.

Tshekedi's regency as acting chief of the Bamangwato is best remembered for his expansion of the mephato (regiments) to build primary schools, grain silos, and water reticulation systems, for his frequent confrontations with the British colonial authorities over the administration of justice in Ngwato country, and for his efforts to deal with a major split in the tribe after Seretse married a white woman, Ruth Williams, while studying law in Britain.

Tshekedi opposed the marriage on the grounds that under Tswana custom a chief could not marry simply as he pleased. He was a servant of the people; the chieftaincy itself was at stake. Seretse would not budge in his desire to marry Ruth, and he did, while exiled in Britain in 1948. Tribal opinion about the marriage basically split evenly along demographic lines – older people went with Tshekedi, the younger with Seretse. In the end, British authorities exiled both men (Tshekedi from the Bamangwato territory, Seretse from the Protectorate altogether). Rioting broke out and a number of people were killed.

Seretse and Ruth were allowed to return to the Protectorate and Seretse and Tshekedi were able to patch things up a bit between themselves. By now though, Seretse saw his destiny not as chief of the Bamangwato tribe, but rather as leader of the Botswana Democratic Party and as President of the soon-to-be independent nation of Botswana in 1966. He would remain Botswana's president until his death from pancreatic cancer in 1980. The story of Seretse and Ruth forms the basis of the 2016 film A United Kingdom.

=== Elections ===
- 1930 Bechuanaland European Advisory Council election
- 1933 Bechuanaland European Advisory Council election
- 1961 Bechuanaland general election
- 1965 Bechuanaland general election

== Office holders ==
=== High commissioners and resident commissioners ===
Flag of the High Commissioner for Southern Africa

The Bechuanaland Protectorate was one of the "High Commission Territories", the others being Basutoland (now Lesotho) and Swaziland (now Eswatini). The High Commissioner had some of the functions of a governor, but the major tribes were self-governing, and the protectorate was not a British possession, so it was not available for white settlement. The office was first held by the Governor of the Cape Colony, then by the Governor-General of South Africa, then by the High Commissioner for Southern Africa until independence. In each of the three territories, the administration of Britain's responsibilities was headed by a Resident Commissioner with some of the functions of a Governor but less authority.

=== Chief Justice ===
The Chief Justice was the Chief Justice of the High Commission Territories (Basutoland, Bechuanaland Protectorate and Swaziland). From 1951 the Chief Justices were:

Incumbent	Tenure	
Incumbent	Took office	Left office
Sir Walter Harragin	1951	1952
Harold Curwen Willan	1952	1956
Sir Herbert Cox	1957	?
Peter Watkin-Williams	1961	1964

=== Prime minister ===
No.	Picture	Name (Birth–Death)	Elected	Took office	Left office	Political Party
1		Seretse Khama (1921–1980)	1965	3 March 1965	30 September 1966	BDP

== Postage stamps ==
Bechuanaland postage stamps were issued from 1888 to 1966. Overprinted stamps were issued until 1932, when the first stamps inscribed "Bechuanaland Protectorate" were issued. On 14 February 1961 the South African rand was introduced, necessitating the surcharging of the existing definitive stamps until new ones were issued.

=== Gallery of postage stamps ===
Postage stamps pictures

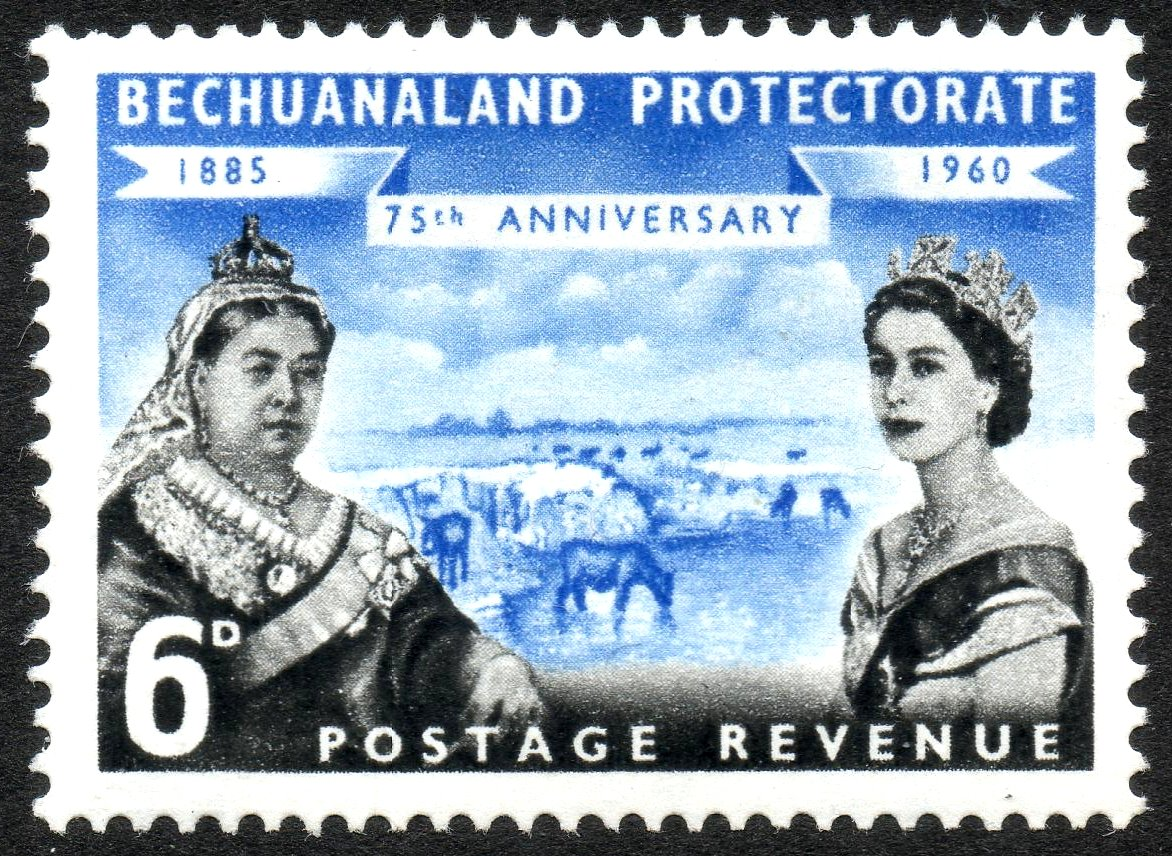

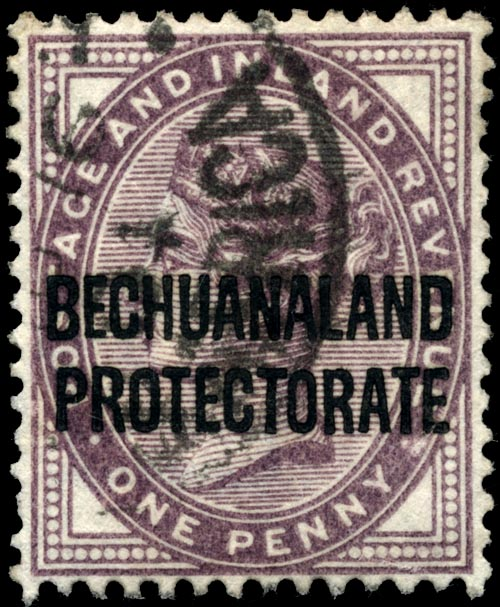

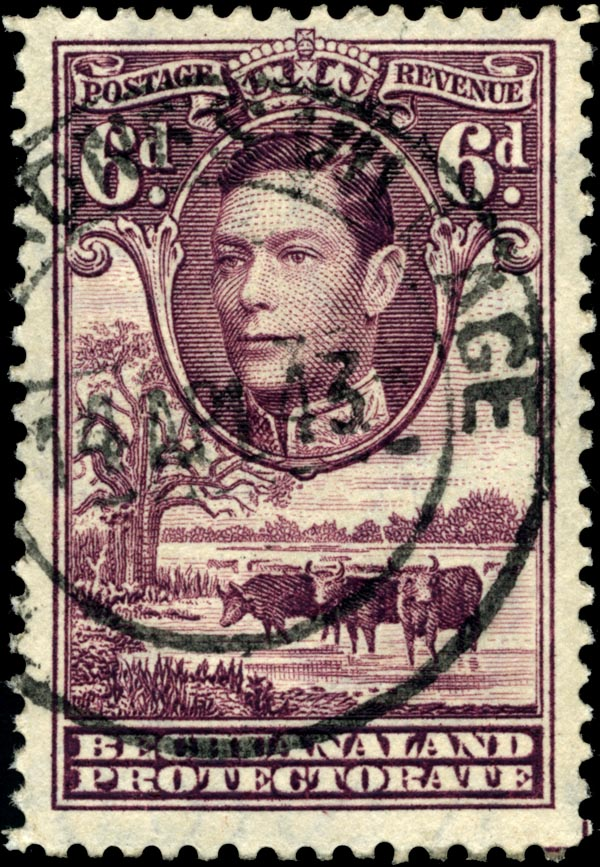

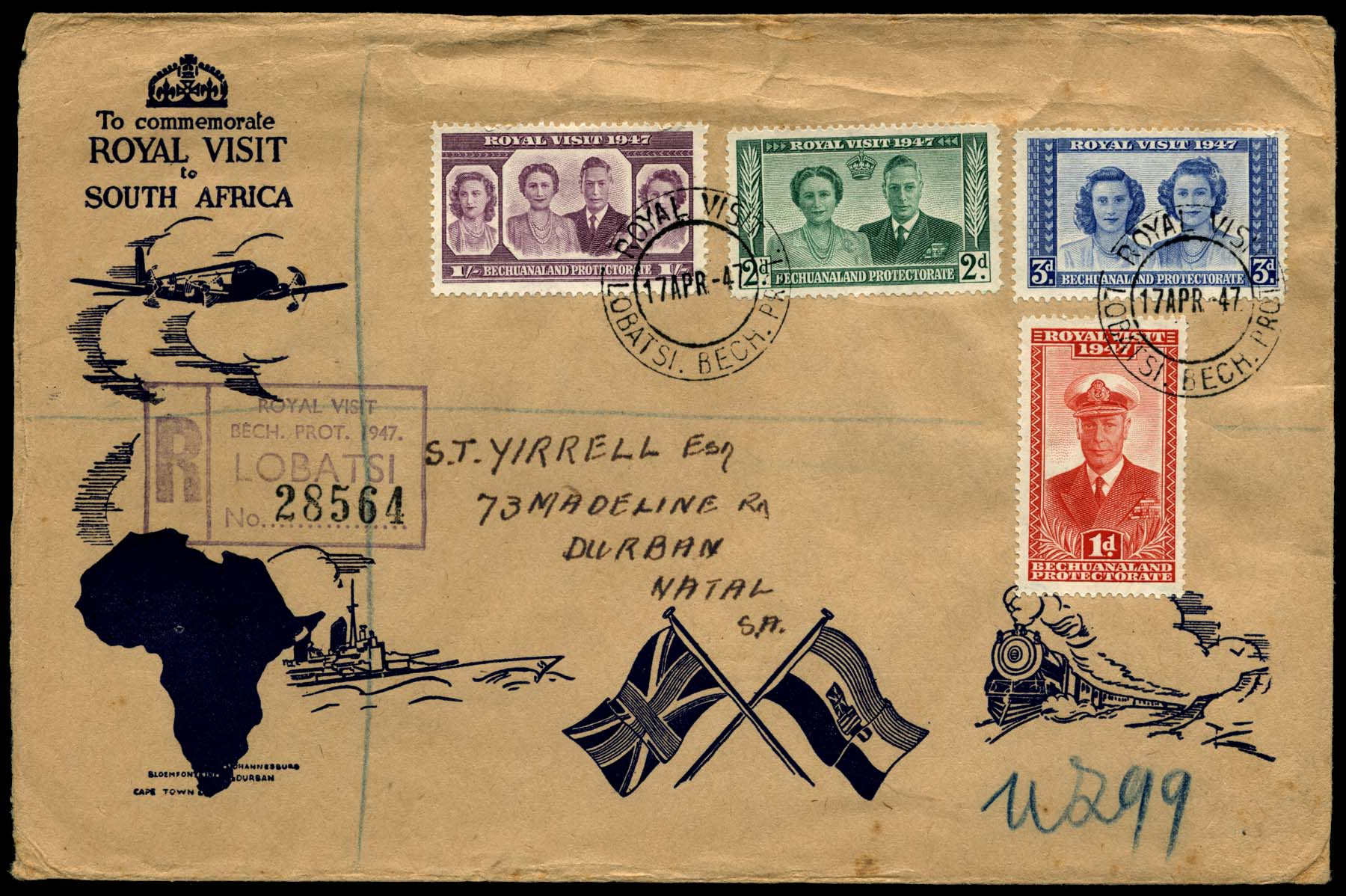

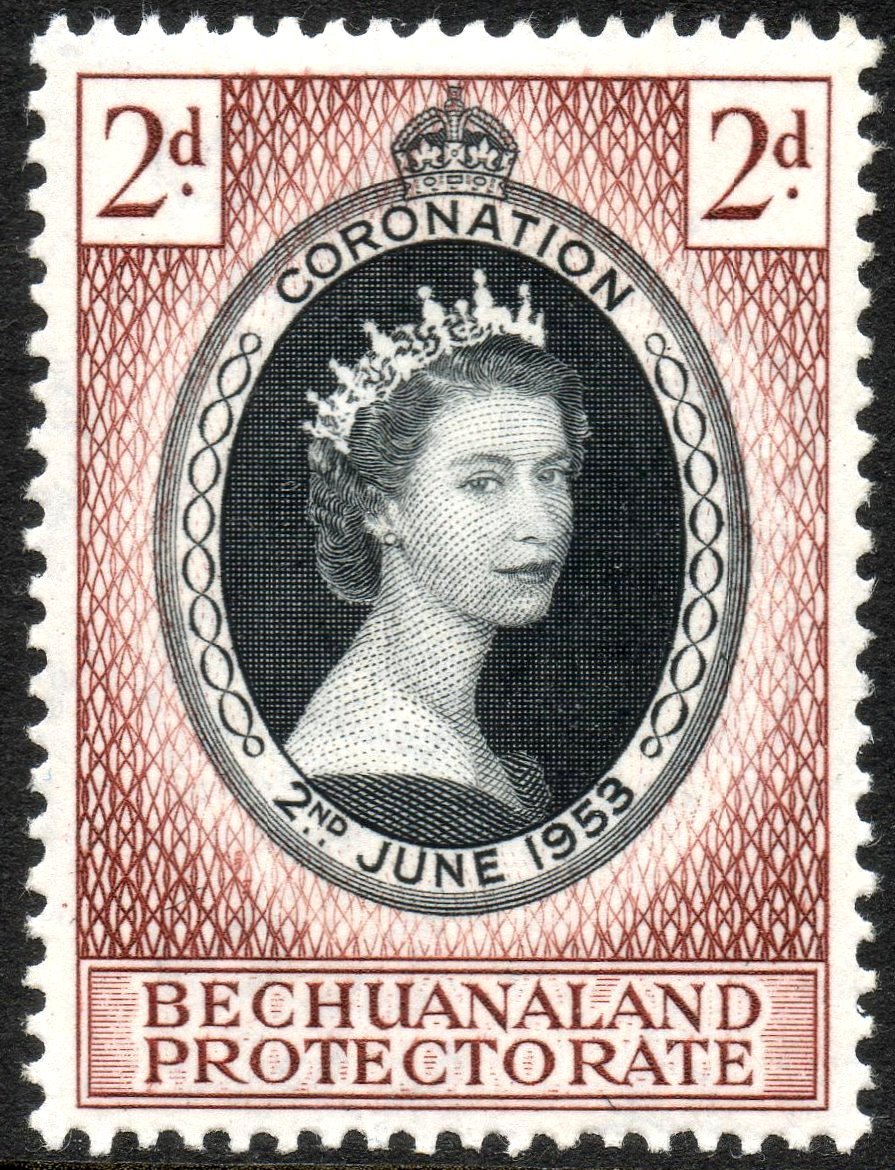

== Notable people ==
- Paul Jousse (died 1945), South African white trader
- Khama III (c. 1837 – 1923), Kgosi (meaning king) of the Bangwato people
- Sebele I, (c. 1841 – 1911), Kgosi of the Kwena
- Bathoen I, (c. 1845 – 1910), Kgosi of the Ngwaketse
- Seretse Khama, (1921 – 1980) Kgosi of the Bangwato and first President of Botswana
- Leetile Disang Raditladi, (1910 – 1971) playwright, poet and journalist

== See also ==
- History of Botswana
- British Bechuanaland, the area south of the Molopo River, now part of South Africa.
