= John Verity (judge) =

British expatriate judge

Chief Justice of Nigeria
- In office 1946–1954

Chief Justice of British Guiana
- In office 1941–1945

Chief Justice of Zanzibar
- In office 1939–1941

Personal details
- Born: 1892 London, UK
- Died: 9 April 1970 (aged 77–78)

Sir John Verity (1892 – 9 April 1970) was a British expatriate judge who was Chief Justice of Zanzibar from 1939 until his appointment as Chief Justice of British Guiana in 1941. He was appointed Chief Justice of Nigeria in 1945.

== Early life, family and education ==
Verity was born in London, the son of Rev. Heron Beresford Verity. He attended Vale College, Thanet then Diocesan College, British Honduras."

== Career ==
He was appointed Puisne Judge in British Guiana in 1936. In 1939, he became Chief Justice of Zanzibar. After the end of his tenure as Chief Justice of Nigeria (1946–1954), Verity was commissioner of Law Revision, Nigeria and co-authored a report with Fatayi Williams on the revised laws of Western Nigeria.

== Personal life ==
On 25 February 1918, Verity married Grace Rochat, the daughter of Mabel Rochat. Grace was his first cousin; they were both grandchildren of Charles Felix Verity of Vale Lodge, Winkfield Berkshire.
