= George Bettesworth Piggott =

Sir George Bettesworth Piggott

Chief Justice of Zanzibar
- In office August 1901 – 1904
- Monarch: Edward VII
- Preceded by: Walter Borthwick Cracknall
- Succeeded by: Lindsey Smith

Assistant Judge for the Sublime Ottoman Porte
- In office 1904–1911

Personal details
- Born: 30 April 1867
- Died: 14 March 1952 (aged 84) Monte Carlo, Monaco
- Party: Municipal Reform Party
- Education: Middle Temple
- Occupation: Judge

Sir George Bettesworth Piggott KBE (30 April 1867 – 14 March 1952) was a British judge who served in various positions under the British Empire.

== Early life ==
Piggott was the son of Fraser Piggott, a justice of the peace. His family had occupied Fitzhall in West Sussex since the 1400s.

He was educated at the Westminster School.

== Law career ==
Piggott was called to the bar at the Middle Temple in June 1888, and practiced law in London and the South-East. Following this, he served as a judicial officer in the British Central Africa Protectorate in 1896.

From June 1900, he served as Acting Assistant Judge in Zanzibar. In August 1901, he was appointed Chief Justice of Zanzibar. While there, he helped implement "a deeply-entrenched legal bureaucracy" and the implementation of British imperial law.

In 1904, he became Assistant Judge for the Sublime Ottoman Porte in Constantinople. He retired from the position in 1911 and returned to Africa, sitting in the East African Court of Appeal and as a judge for the Sultanate of Zanzibar.

== Political career ==
In 1913, he unsuccessfully contested Battersea in the London County Council election (LCC) as a member of the Municipal Reform Party. However, he sat on the LCC from 1917 to 1919 for Mile End, and then for Clapham until 1922. At the time of his retirement from the LCC, he was chairman of the Public Control Committee.

== Personal life ==
On 12 July 1904, Piggott married Amy Spiller, a granddaughter of ironmaster Robert Thompson Crawshay. She died on 14 April 1909 in Helwan, Egypt.

In 1915, he married Nadine Beauchamp, daughter of Reginald William Proctor-Beauchamp. In 1927, he married Winifred Lathbury.

Throughout the build-up and length of World War II, Piggott and his third wife travelled around Canada and the United States: he had stated that "in [his] opinion" there would be no war. During this time, they enjoyed the company of various socialites, entertaining guests at hotels at Palm Beach, Florida, and holidaying in Alberta's Rockies. They attended parties with Archduke Franz Josef of Austria and his wife.

He died on 14 March 1952 in Monte Carlo.

== Honours ==
- Commander of the British Empire (CBE) – 1918
- Knight Commander of the British Empire (KBE) – 1919
