= 1933 Bechuanaland European Advisory Council election =

Elections to the European Advisory Council were held in Bechuanaland Protectorate in 1933.

== Electoral system ==
The European Advisory Council consisted of seven elected members, all of which were elected from single-member constituencies.

Voting was restricted to people who were British subjects of European descent that had lived in the protectorate for at least a year prior to the election, or non British residents who had lived in the territory for at least five years. All voters were also required to have either:

- owned or leased land with a value of at least £200,
- owning stock used for farming with a value of over £200,
- held a general dealer's licence, or
- had an annual income over at least £200 from sources in the protectorate

Candidates were required to be nominated by five registered voters.

== Results ==
| Constituency | | Winning candidate | Notes |
|---|---|---|---|
| 1 | Ghanzi District and all Crown Lands | Henry Weatherilt | Re-elected unopposed |
| 2 | Francistown District | R McFarlane | Re-elected unopposed |
| 3 | Tuli Block District | | No nominations |
| 4 | Ngwato, Ngamiland and Chobe | G Haskins | Elected |
| 5 | Gaberones Block | LS Glover | Re-elected unopposed |
| 6 | Lobatsi District | GFJ van Rensburg | Re-elected, defeating RA Good |
| 7 | Bamalete, Bakgatla, Bakweta and Bangwaketsi reserves and Barolong farms | RL Ciring | Re-elected unopposed |
Source: Colonial Reports

== Subsequent by-elections ==
In 1934 G Haskins died and Henry Weatherilt resigned from the Council. By-elections were subsequently held for constituencies 1 and 4, as well as the vacant constituency 3. CK Going was elected unopposed in constituency 3, CW Martin was returned unopposed in constituency 3, and there were no nominations for constituency 4.
