= 1930 Bechuanaland European Advisory Council election =

Elections to the European Advisory Council were held in Bechuanaland Protectorate in December 1930.

== Electoral system ==
The European Advisory Council consisted of seven elected members, all of which were elected from single-member constituencies.

Voting was restricted to people who were British subjects of European descent, had lived in the protectorate for at least a year prior to the election and who also:

- owned or leased land with a value of at least £200
- owned stock used for farming with a value of over £200
- held a general dealer's licence.
- had an annual income over at least £200 from sources in the protectorate

Candidates were required to be nominated by five registered voters, and make a deposit of £25. The deposit was only refunded if they received more than 20% of the votes obtained by the winning candidate.

== Results ==
Constituency		Winning candidate	Notes
1	Ghanzi District and all Crown Lands	Henry Weatherilt	Re-elected unopposed
2	Francistown District	R McFarlane	Re-elected unopposed
3	Tuli Block District	WG Mason	Unopposed
4	Ngwato, Ngamiland and Chobe	Robert Bailey	Re-elected
5	Gaberones Block	LS Glover	Re-elected unopposed
6	Lobatsi District	GFJ van Rensburg	Re-elected unopposed
7	Bamalete, Bakgatla, Bakweta and Bangwaketsi reserves and Barolong farms	RH Linton	Elected
Source: Colonial Reports

== Subsequent by-elections ==
During 1932, Robert Bailey (constituency 4) died and RH Linton (constituency 7) left the protectorate. In the by-elections held later in the year E Fodisch and RL Ciring were elected to replace them.
