= Tan Boon Teik =

Singaporean judge (1929–2012)

Tan Boon Teik SC DUBC
- 陈文德

2nd Attorney-General of Singapore
- In office 1 February 1967 – 30 April 1992; Acting: 1 February 1967 – 31 December 1968
- Preceded by: Ahmad Mohamed Ibrahim
- Succeeded by: Chan Sek Keong

Solicitor-General of Singapore
- In office 1 September 1963 – 31 January 1967
- Preceded by: T. Kulasekaram

Personal details
- Born: 17 January 1929 Penang, Straits Settlements
- Died: 10 March 2012 (aged 83) Singapore
- Spouse: Tan Sook Yee
- Education: University College London (LLB, LLM)

Tan Boon Teik
- Simplified Chinese: 陈文德
Transcriptions
Standard Mandarin
- Hanyu Pinyin: Chén Wéndé

Tan Boon Teik SC DUBC (/ˌtɑːn ˌbʊn ˈteɪk/ tahn-buun-TAYK; 17 January 1929 – 10 March 2012) was a Singaporean judge who served as the second attorney-general of Singapore between 1969 and 1992. At the age of 39, Tan was the youngest person to be appointed as attorney-general, and was the longest-serving attorney-general after the Independence of Singapore, after 25 years in office.

Tan attended University College London before he was called to the Bar in 1952 as a barrister-at-law of England and Wales by Middle Temple, and became an advocate and solicitor of the Supreme Court of the Federation of Malaya in 1954.

He joined the Singapore Legal Service in 1955 as a police court magistrate. He was subsequently appointed Deputy Registrar and Sheriff of the High Court in 1956, Director of the Legal Aid Bureau in 1959, and Senior Crown Counsel in 1963. He also taught part-time at the University of Singapore when it was started in 1956.

He became Solicitor-General in 1963, Acting Attorney-General in 1967, and Attorney-General in 1969. During his tenure, he prepared many legal opinions on important constitutional and administrative law issues, and was also the Government's lead counsel in a number of notable cases. The Attorney-General's Chambers (AGC) published the first reprint of the Constitution in 1980, and revised editions of Singapore statutes in 1970 and 1985. In 1990, it launched LawNet, a computer database then containing the full text of Singapore legislation. Tan was involved in the establishment of the Singapore Academy of Law, and was the first chairman of the Singapore International Arbitration Centre, a post he held between 1991 and 1999.

Tan was conferred the Darjah Utama Bakti Cemerlang (Distinguished Service Order) in 1978. He was appointed Senior Counsel in 1989, and made an Officer of the French Legion of Honour in 1998.

Tan suffered from Parkinson's disease towards the end of his life. Following internal bleeding, he died on 10 March 2012.

== Early life and education ==
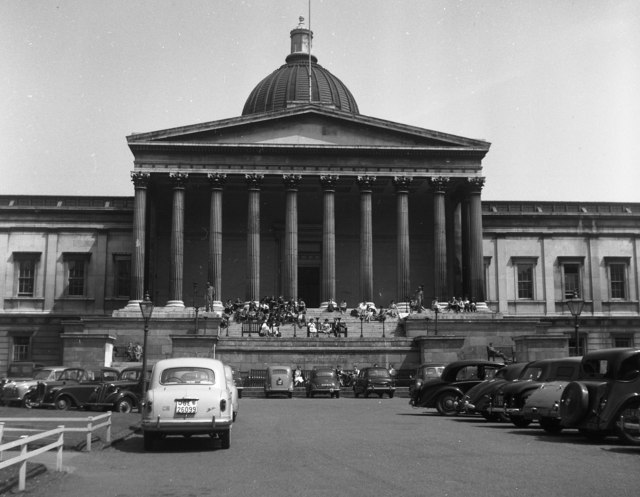
The Wilkins Building of University College London on Gower Street in May 1956

Tan was born on 17 January 1929 in Penang, Straits Settlements (now part of Malaysia), and had his secondary education at the Penang Free School. He graduated from University College London with a Bachelor of Laws (LL.B.) degree with honours in 1951, and later a Master of Laws (LL.M.) in 1953. Between 1961 and 1962, he held a Rockefeller Research Fellowship at the Institute of Advanced Legal Studies of the University of London. He was a barrister-at-law of England and Wales, having been called to the Bar by Middle Temple in 1952, and became an advocate and solicitor of the Supreme Court of the Federation of Malaya in 1954.

== Career ==
Initially in private legal practice in Penang after being called to the Bar there, Tan joined the Singapore Legal Service in 1955 as a police court magistrate, and subsequently served as Deputy Registrar and Sheriff of the High Court (appointed November 1956), the Director of the Legal Aid Bureau (1959), and Senior Crown Counsel (1963). He also taught part-time at the Faculty of Law of the University of Singapore when it was started in 1956. In 1961, he represented Singapore at the Seminar on the Protection of Human Rights in the Administration of Criminal Justice organised by the United Nations in Wellington, New Zealand. With effect from 1 September 1963, he became the Solicitor-General, succeeding T. Kulasekaram who had been appointed a Supreme Court judge. He was then appointed Acting Attorney-General from 1 February 1967 to 31 December 1968, and as Attorney-General from 1 January 1969 to 30 April 1992. Tan was 39 years old when he became Attorney-General, and is believed to have been the youngest person to hold this post. As of 10 March 2012, he was the longest serving Attorney-General of post-independence Singapore, having held office for just over 25 years.

During his tenure, he prepared many legal opinions on important constitutional and administrative law issues. He was also the Government's lead counsel in a number of notable cases, including Lee Mau Seng v. Minister for Home Affairs (1971), which involved four executives of the Nanyang Siang Pau (South Seas Business Newspaper), a Chinese-language newspaper, who had been detained without trial under the Internal Security Act ("ISA") for "glamorising communism and stirring up communal and chauvinistic sentiments over Chinese language, education and culture". Upon an application by the detainees for habeas corpus, the High Court held that the President, when acting on Cabinet's advice to detain a person under the ISA, exercises a subjective discretion as to whether the person is a risk to national security, which is not justiciable by the courts. Although the judgment was later disapproved by the Court of Appeal in Chng Suan Tze v. Minister for Home Affairs (1988), in 1989 Parliament amended the Constitution and the ISA to "freeze" the law relating to detentions under the Act to that applying in Singapore on the date when Lee Mau Seng was decided.

In the 1970s, the financial collapse of two companies, Gemini Chit Fund Corporation and Stallion Corporation, led to criminal charges being brought against their executives. The companies operated chit funds, which were schemes in which investors paid sums of money by instalments to the companies in exchange for the entitlement to be allotted a larger return from the fund. The allotment was determined by lot or by auction. Following their collapse, it was estimated that 40,000 investors had lost about S$50 million. Under Tan's leadership of the Attorney-General's Chambers, Gemini's managing director Abdul Gaffar Mohamed Ibrahim pleaded guilty to criminal breach of trust of $3.2 million and was sentenced to life imprisonment, and its chairman V.K.S. Narayanan received nine months' imprisonment for two charges under the Companies Act. Stallion's executive director Martin Ler Cheng Seng pleaded guilty to authorising his firm to unlawfully bid at a Stallion chit fund sale, and was jailed for a year.

Tan also successfully brought proceedings for scandalising the court against Wong Hong Toy, the Chairman of the Workers' Party of Singapore, in 1983, and against respondents involved in publishing, printing and distributing articles that appeared in the Asian Wall Street Journal in 1985 and 1991.

Where public international law matters were concerned, in 1966 Tan attended the Sixth Committee on International Law at the 21st Session of the United Nations General Assembly in New York, and chaired a meeting of law ministers to review extradition arrangements among Commonwealth nations at Marlborough House, London, in 1982. He also regularly attended Commonwealth Law Ministers' Conferences and ASEAN Law Association Conferences.

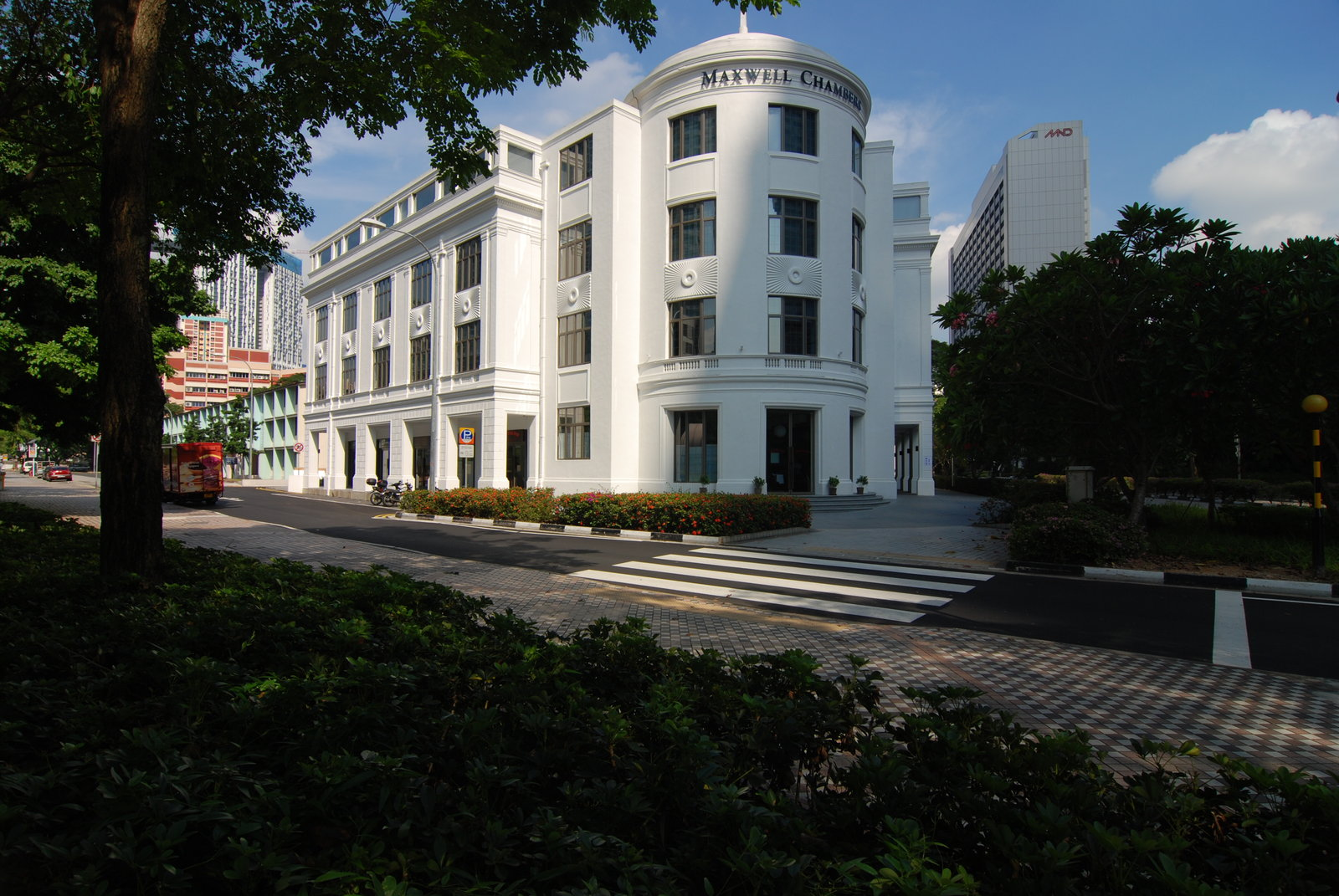
Maxwell Chambers, where the Singapore International Arbitration Centre (SIAC) is now based, in October 2009. Tan Boon Teik was the first Chairman of the SIAC when it was established in July 1991.

While Tan headed the Attorney-General's Chambers, it published the first reprint of the Constitution in 1980, and revised editions of Singapore statutes in 1970 and 1985. A 1990 revised edition of subsidiary legislation was subsequently published in 1992. In January 1990, the Attorney-General's Chambers launched LawNet, a computer database then containing the full text of Singapore legislation, at the cost of $4.3 million. Tan was involved in the establishment of the Singapore Academy of Law, a professional association of judges, lawyers, Legal Service officers and law academics, and served as its vice-president from 1992.

Tan was appointed the Chairman of the Singapore International Arbitration Centre (SIAC) when it was formed in July 1991, and held the post until August 1999. In March 1992, he appointed a committee to review Singapore's arbitration laws, which then dealt only with domestic arbitration, to bring them "in line with international developments". The committee's work led to the enactment of the International Arbitration Act in 1994.

In addition to his Attorney-General post, Tan was the Chairman of the Singapore Petroleum Company (SPC; 1971 – August 1999), a director and deputy chairman (from 1985) and later chairman (June 1990 – 1994) of the Insurance Corporation of Singapore (ICS), Vice-president (from 1972) and President (from 1992) of the Singapore Musical Society, and a fellow of the Singapore Institute of Directors.

== Later years ==
Tan's service as Attorney-General was extended by the Government twice to enable them to find a replacement for him – the first time for five years when he was 55, and again for three years when he was 60 years old. He eventually retired with effect from 30 April 1992; the post was taken up by Chan Sek Keong. In September that year he was named Ambassador to Hungary resident in Singapore, and in January and May 1994 the non-resident ambassadorships of Austria and the Slovak Republic were respectively added to his portfolio.

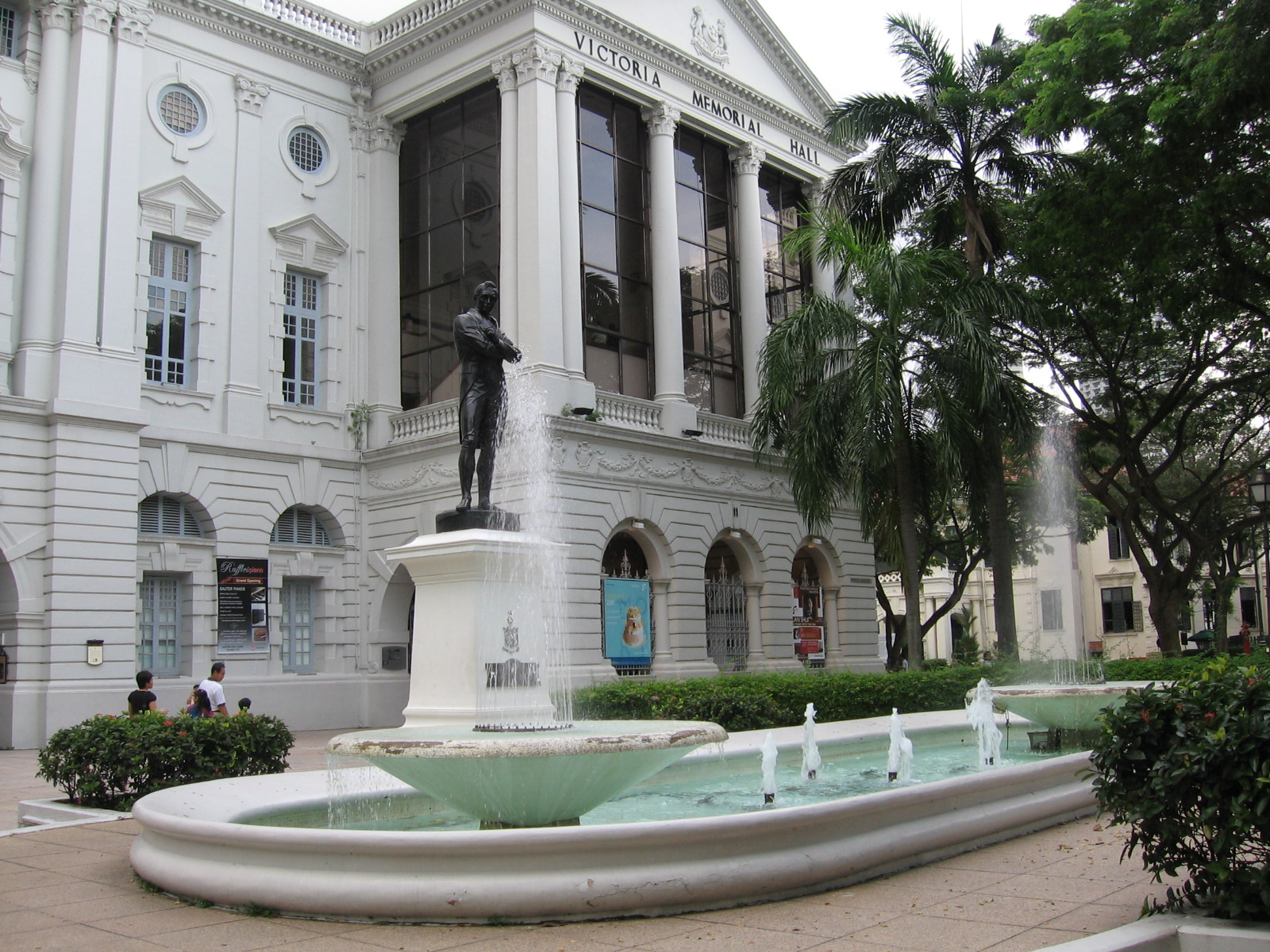
Victoria Concert Hall in January 2006, for many years the home of the Singapore Symphony Orchestra

During his retirement, Tan remained Chairman of the SPC, the ICS and the SIAC, positions which he had assumed when he was the Attorney-General. An accomplished pianist, he also continued as chairman and Honorary Chairman of the Singapore Symphonia Company Ltd., the corporation managing the Singapore Symphony Orchestra which he had helped to found in 1979, until September 1999. In July 1992, Tan was appointed a director of United Industrial Corporation Ltd. (UIC) and its property arm, Singapore Land Ltd. He became Chairman of Morgan Grenfell Asia Ltd. in November 1993. In addition, he was Chairman of Deutsche Asia Pacific Holdings.

Tan, who had suffered from Parkinson's disease for the last 15 years of his life, collapsed suddenly from internal bleeding and died on 10 March 2012, aged 83. The funeral was held on 13 March at the Roman Catholic Church of Saint Ignatius, followed by a private cremation at Mandai Crematorium. Tan was survived by his wife Mrs. Tan Sook Yee, his son Pip Tan Seng Hin and daughter Tan Sui Lin, and five grandchildren. Tan Sook Yee taught property law at the Faculty of Law of the National University of Singapore from 1964 to 2005 and was its dean between 1980 and 1987, while both of Tan's children are members of the legal profession.

The Minister for Law, K. Shanmugam, said on 11 March that Tan had "contributed greatly during the formative years of our independence and the development of the AGC". The Attorney-General's Chambers itself released a statement saying that Tan had held office "during a crucial period in Singapore's history in the years after independence. During that period, the seeds were sown for an uncompromising law and order framework. ... Mr Tan played a pivotal role in shaping the legal landscape of Singapore and upholding the rule of law which has underpinned much of Singapore's success." In a letter of condolence to Tan's widow, former Prime Minister Lee Kuan Yew said that he held Tan in high esteem and had found him to be "efficient, competent and always ready to find a solution to difficult problems" when he was Attorney-General.

== Honours and awards ==
In 1978 Tan was awarded the Darjah Utama Bakti Cemerlang (Distinguished Service Order), the citation stating that he had "steadfastly shunned the rewards of private practice" to devote many years of distinguished and dedicated service to Singapore. He was appointed Senior Counsel with effect from 21 April 1989 when the scheme was introduced, under a provision of the Legal Profession Act stating that persons holding office as the Attorney-General and Solicitor-General immediately before that date were deemed to have been so appointed.

On 8 June 1998, Tan was conferred the rank of Officer in the National Order of the Legion of Honour of France for his contributions towards increasing commercial ties between France and Singapore as co-chairman of the France–Singapore Business Council since 1995. He was also an honorary fellow of the Singapore Institute of Arbitrators.

== Selected works ==
- Sheridan, L[ionel] A[stor]; Tan, Boon Teik (1957). Elementary Law: An Introduction for the Malayan Citizen. Singapore: D. Moore for the Singapore Council for Adult Education. OCLC 9203351.
- Tan, Boon Teik (1985). "Transnational Fraud". Lloyd's Maritime and Commercial Law Quarterly: 418–423, the text of a lecture to the International Maritime Bureau at Queen Mary College, University of London, on 4 June 1985. It was reprinted as "Transnational Fraud". Commonwealth Law Bulletin. 11 (4): 1433–1438. 1985. doi:10.1080/03050718.1985.9985835.
- Tan, Boon Teik (1988). "The Singapore Law Review Lecture: Judicial Review". Singapore Law Review. 9: 69–83., the text of the Fourth Singapore Law Review Lecture at the Faculty of Law, National University of Singapore, on 4 December 1987.

== Bibliography ==
- Tan, Boon Teik (1988), "The Singapore Law Review Lecture: Judicial Review", Singapore Law Review, 9: 69–83..
