= Ralph Windham =

British colonial lawyer and judge (1905–1980)

Sir Ralph Windham

Chief Justice of Zanzibar
- In office 1955–1959
- Preceded by: George Gilmour Robinson
- Succeeded by: Gerald MacMahon Mahon

Chief Justice of Tanganyika
- In office 1960–1965
- Preceded by: Edward John Davies
- Succeeded by: Philip Telford Georges

Personal details
- Born: 25 March 1905 Wawne, Yorkshire, England
- Died: 6 July 1980 (aged 75)
- Occupation: Lawyer, judge

Sir Ralph Windham (25 March 1905 – 6 July 1980) was a British lawyer who held various positions in the Colonial Legal Service.

He was a judge in Palestine, Ceylon, Kenya, Zanzibar and Tanganyika.

While trying a case in Tel Aviv in January 1947 he was kidnapped from the courtroom by Jewish terrorists, but was released on the next day.

== Early years ==
Ralph Windham was born on 25 March 1905, son of Ashe Windham and Cora Ellen Sowerby Middleton. His family had owned property in Wawne township, Yorkshire, since 1651. (Note: Wawne manor was part of the Meaux Abbey estate, and was held by the Crown until being sold in 1628. Joseph, Edward and Jonathon Ashe, members of a merchant family from London, bought the property in 1651. Later Sir Joseph Ashe enlarged the property by purchasing other estates. Sir Joseph's granddaughter married Joseph Windham, who further expanded the estate. It passed to Joseph Windham (1739–1810) and then to his sister Anne Windham (died 1815), wife of Sir William Smyth (died 1823). Their son took the name Joseph Smyth Windham, and by 1846 owned 3,320 acres (1,340 ha) in Wawme township. The estate passed to Ralph's father Ashe Windham, who sold lots amounting to nearly 2,690 acres (1,090 ha) in 1912, and other properties in later years. Sir Ralph Windham inherited the remainder when his father died in 1937. After being requisitioned by the War Office during World War II and repurchased by Ralph Windham, most of it was sold for a housing estate in 1961.) His grandfather, also Ashe Windham (died 1909) had served in the colonial judiciary in Africa.

Ralph Windham attended Wellington College, Berkshire, and then Trinity College, Cambridge, graduating in 1928 with a Bachelor of Laws degree.

He continued his studies at Trinity, and in 1930 graduated with a Master of Arts and won the Buchanan Prize for Students for Lincolns Inn.

That year he was admitted to Lincoln's Inn as a barrister.

== Career ==
=== Palestine (1945–1947) ===
On 3 July 1935, Windham was appointed a member of the Legal Board of Palestine by O. C. K. Corrie, Acting Chief Justice of Palestine.

Windham held the office of Judge of the District Court of Palestine in 1942. On 27 January 1947, Jewish extremists kidnapped Windham from the Tel Aviv District courtroom. The armed men snatched Windham while still wearing his judge's robe and wig. The kidnapping seemed to be linked to the impending execution of Dov Gruner, a member of the Irgun. High Commissioner Sir Alan Cunningham told Jewish leaders that if Windham and another hostage were not quickly freed he would impose martial law on parts of the country.

Later that day an application for leave to appeal Dov Gruner's sentence to the Judicial Committee of the Privy Council was granted.

In the parliamentary debate the next day Mr. Winston Churchill demanded assurance that Gruner's death sentence had not been respited on account of the hostages taken by the Jewish terrorists."

Windham was released that night. He said he had not been mistreated, but the kidnappers had kept his wig as a souvenir.

In July 1977, Windham told the story of his kidnapping in a Thames Television interview.

=== Ceylon (1948–1951) ===
In 1948, Ralph Windham was appointed a puisne judge of the Supreme Court of Ceylon by the King on the recommendations of the Colonial Secretary, the last judge to be appointed in this way.

British Ceylon became independent as the Dominion of Ceylon on 4 February 1948, but Justice Ralph Windham continued to serve until 1951.

=== East Africa (1951–1965) ===
On 10 April 1951, Ralph Windham, puisne judge, was appointed to exercise jurisdiction in divorce cases in Kenya.

On 25 July 1955, Ralph Williams, puisne judge, Kenya, was appointed Chief Justice of Zanzibar.

Ralph Windham, Chief Justice, Zanzibar, was appointed a Justice of Appeal at the Court of Appeal for Eastern Africa as of 6 January 1959.

In May 1959, the Queen gave permission for Ralph Windham, lately Chief Justice, Zanzibar, to wear the insignia of the second class of the Order of the Brilliant Star of Zanzibar, which had been conferred by the Sultan of Zanzibar.

In May 1960, Ralph Windham, Justice of the East African Court of Appeal, was appointed Chief Justice of Tanganyika.

In June 1960, it was announced that Ralph Windham, Justice of Appeal, HM Court of Appeal for Eastern Africa, had been appointed Knight Bachelor in the 1960 Birthday Honours List.

Dick Eberlie, his ADC at this time, described him as "a quiet and gentle man", committed to maintaining the rule of law.

Sir Ralph acted as Governor-General whenever Richard Turnbull had to leave the country.

He remained Chief Justice after Tanganyika became independent on 9 December 1961, holding office until 1965.

== Family ==
Windham married Kathleen Mary FitzHerbert, daughter of Captain Cecil Henry FitzHerbert and Ellen Katharine Lowndes, on 11 September 1946.

They had four children, John Jeremy (b. 1948), Andrew Guy (b. 1949), Penelope Susan (b. 1952) and Belinda Mary Victoria (b. 1955).

Sir Ralph Windham died on 6 July 1980 at age 75.

== Publications ==
- Ralph Windham; A. L. Gardiner (1939), "Middle East I. Palestine", Journal of Comparative Legislation and International Law, 21 (3), Cambridge University Press on behalf of the British Institute of International and Comparative Law: 172–175, JSTOR 754808
- Ralph Windham, Zanzibar. Law reports, 1951 to 1956

== Sources ==
- Allison, K J; Baggs, A P; Cooper, T N; Davidson-Cragoe, C; Walker, J (2002), "Middle division: Wawne", in G H R Kent (ed.), A History of the County of York East Riding, vol. 7, Holderness Wapentake, Middle and North Divisions, London, pp. 181–204
- "Appointments", Kenya Gazette, 13 January 1959
- "Birthday Honours List", Kenya Government Gazette, LXH—No. 30, Nairobi, 11 June 1960
- Corrie, O.C.K (11 July 1935), "Warrant of Appointment to the Legal Board" (PDF), The Palestine Gazette, p. 583
- Creech Jones (28 January 1947), "Jewish Terrorism (Government Action)", Hansard, vol. 432 cc772-6772
- Dinesh Weerakkody (13 February 2013), "The Supreme Court of Sri Lanka", ft.lk, Wijeya Newspapers Ltd
- Eberlie, Dick (2016), "Part 3, 1961 to 1965", The Winds and Wounds of Change, Richard F. Eberlie, ISBN 978-0993273216
- Extremists Kidnap British Judge in Palestine; Force Postponement of Gruner's Execution, Jewish Telegraphic Agency, 28 January 1947
- Harley, E. R. (17 April 1951), "Government Notice No 436", Kenya Gazette
- "Home Office" (PDF), The London Gazette (41718): 3403, 26 May 1959
- "Judge's Story of Capture", The Daily Telegraph, Sydney, NSW, 30 January 1947
- Nihal Jayawickrama (26 September 2015), "The Hybrid Court", Colombo Telegraph
- Palestine - Interview With Judge Ralph Windham, 12 July 1977
- Papers of the Ashe and Windham Family (Incorporating Bowyer and Smijth) of Wawne (Waghen), Hull University Archives, Hull History Centre
- Mosley, Charles, ed. (2003), Burke's Peerage, Baronetage & Knightage (107 ed.), Wilmington, Delaware, U.S.A.: Burke's Peerage (Genealogical Books) Ltd.
- "The Church House, Westminster", The London Gazette (40554), 5 August 1955
- "The Church House, Westminster". The London Gazette. No. 42039. 20 May 1960. p. 3575.
