= Koh Juat Jong =

Solicitor-General of Singapore

Koh Juat Jong SC
- 韩月榕

Solicitor-General of Singapore
- In office 10 April 2008 – 31 January 2014
- Appointed by: S. R. Nathan
- Preceded by: Walter Woon

Acting Attorney-General of Singapore
- In office 11 April 2010 – 30 September 2010
- Appointed by: S. R. Nathan
- Preceded by: Walter Woon
- Succeeded by: Sundaresh Menon

Personal details
- Born: Han Juat Jong; 1959 or 1960 (age 66–67)
- Education: University College London (BS); National University of Singapore (LLB); Harvard University (LLM)

Chinese name
- Traditional Chinese: 韓月榕
- Simplified Chinese: 韩月榕
- Hanyu Pinyin: Hán Yuèróng

Koh Juat Jong SC (Chinese: 韩月榕; born 1959 or 1960) is a Singaporean judge who served as Solicitor-General of Singapore between 2008 and 2014.

== Early life ==
Koh attended CHIJ Saint Nicholas Girls' School and National Junior College, and was named a President's Scholar in 1978. She graduated with a Bachelor of Science in economics and statistics from University College London in 1981. She then joined the Administrative Service. She obtained her Bachelor of Laws from the National University of Singapore Faculty of Law in 1988 and her Master of Laws from Harvard Law School in 1989.

== Career ==
Between 1981 and 1986, Koh joined the Administrative Service and served in the Ministry of Finance dealing with tax policies and personnel policies.

Koh joined the Attorney-General's Chambers as a State Counsel before being posted to the Supreme Court as a Senior Assistant Registrar. In 1995, she was appointed a District Judge and subsequently became the Principal District Judge, Family and Juvenile Justice Division. In 2003, she became Registrar of the Supreme Court; five years later, she was appointed the first female Solicitor-General in 2008. She was Acting Attorney-General for five months in 2010 during a leadership transition.

Koh was awarded the Public Administration Medal (Gold) during the National Day Awards in 2005 and the Public Administration Medal (Gold) (Bar) during the National Day Awards in 2011. She retired from her appointment of Solicitor General on 31 Jan 2014.
