= Ahmad Mohamed Ibrahim =

Singaporean lawyer and first attorney-general of Singapore

Yang Berbahagia Tan Sri Dato' Ahmad Mohamed Ibrahim
- احمد محمد إبراهيم
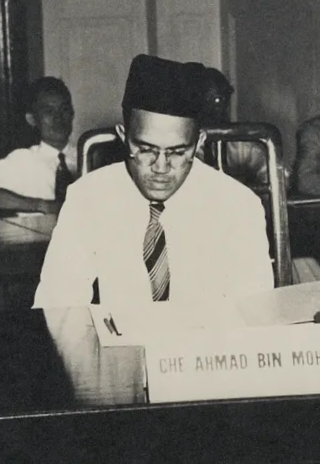
- Ahmad c. 1951–1952

1st Attorney-General of Singapore
- In office 9 August 1965 – 31 January 1967
- Preceded by: Himself (as State Advocate-General of Singapore)
- Succeeded by: Tan Boon Teik

State Advocate-General of the State of Singapore
- In office 25 June 1959 – 8 August 1965
- Preceded by: E. P. Shanks (as Attorney-General of the Crown Colony of Singapore)
- Succeeded by: Himself (as Attorney-General of Singapore)

Personal details
- Born: 15 May 1916 Singapore, Straits Settlements
- Died: 17 April 1999 (aged 82) Gombak, Malaysia
- Spouse: Salmah Mohamed Tahir
- Relations: Cal Bellini
- Education: St John’s College, Cambridge

Ahmad bin Mohamed Ibrahim (15 May 1916 – 17 April 1999) was a Singaporean lawyer and law professor who served as the first Attorney-General of Singapore between 1965 and 1967.

== Early life ==
Ahmad was educated at the Victoria Bridge School (now the Victoria School), Raffles Institution, and Raffles College (now the National University of Singapore). In 1936, he received the Queen's Scholarship (now the President's Scholarship) to study at St John's College, University of Cambridge. He graduated in 1939 with 1st Class Economics Tripos I and 1st Class Law Tripos II, and attained a Masters in Law in 1965. He was awarded the Honorary Degree of Doctor of Laws (LL.D) from the University of Singapore on 5 June 1965.

== Career ==
In 1948, Ahmad stood as an independent candidate in the Municipal Commission Election in Singapore and won. He became Singapore's first State Advocate General in 1959, and the nation's first non-British Attorney-General in 1966. He moved to Malaysia in 1969.

In 1972, he became the dean of the law faculty of the University of Malaya. There he established the first law faculty in Malaysia. He was also later made Professor of Malaysian Law, and in 1984 University of Malaya honoured Ahmad with the highest academic title it could confer - Professor Emeritus.

In 1984, Ahmad was instrumental in setting up the Kulliyyah of Laws at International Islamic University Malaysia (IIUM), and was made the Shaikh and the Dean of the Kulliyyah. In 2000, the Kulliyyah was named the "Ahmad Ibrahim Kulliyyah" in honour of Ahmad as the founding father of the Kulliyyah.

Ahmad was a key individual in the merger talks between Singapore and Malaysia in the early 1960s. He was also the legal advisor in the Singapore delegation to the Malaysia Talks in London in 1963, which discussed independence from Britain.

Former Singaporean deputy prime minister Goh Keng Swee once described Ahmad as a man of "tremendous breadth and depth of intellect, whose ability as a legal draftsman is unsurpassed in this country".

== Personal life ==
Ahmad was the brother of the actor Khalid Ibrahim, who used the stage name Cal Bellini.

== Honours ==
- Malaysia
  - Commander of the Order of Loyalty to the Crown of Malaysia (P.S.M.) (1987)
