= Walter Woon =

Professor of law

Walter Woon SC
- 温长明

5th Attorney-General of Singapore
- In office 11 April 2008 – 10 April 2010
- Appointed by: S. R. Nathan
- Preceded by: Chao Hick Tin
- Succeeded by: Koh Juat Jong (acting); Sundaresh Menon

Solicitor-General of Singapore
- In office 2 July 2007 – 10 April 2008
- Appointed by: S. R. Nathan
- Preceded by: Chan Seng Onn
- Succeeded by: Koh Juat Jong

Nominated Member of Parliament
- In office 7 September 1992 – 15 December 1996
- Appointed by: Wee Kim Wee

Personal details
- Born: Walter Woon Cheong Ming; 12 September 1956 (age 70) Colony of Singapore
- Education: National University of Singapore (LLB); University of Cambridge (LLM)
- Occupation: Lawyer; academic; diplomat

Walter Woon Cheong Ming (Note: Chinese: 温长明; Jyutping: Wan^{1} Coeng^{4} Ming^{4}; pinyin: Wēn Chángmíng) (born 12 September 1956) is a Singaporean lawyer who served as the fifth attorney-general of Singapore between 2008 and 2010. He is currently an Emeritus Professor at the National University of Singapore Faculty of Law, Lee Kong Chian Visiting professor at the Singapore Management University Yong Pung How School of Law, and the dean of the RHT Legal Training Institute.

A lawyer by profession, Woon specialises in company law and securities regulation. Having graduated from the National University of Singapore and St. John's College, Cambridge, Woon joined the teaching staff of the National University of Singapore Faculty of Law in 1981 and subsequently served as Sub-Dean and Vice-Dean. He was appointed Professor of Law in 1999. He had also served as the legal adviser to the president of Singapore and the Council of Presidential Advisers between 1995 and 1997.

Woon was a Nominated Member of Parliament between 1992 and 1996. He became the first Member of Parliament since 1965 to have a Private Member's Bill become a public law in Singapore—the Maintenance of Parents Act, which was passed in 1995.

From 1997 to 2006, Woon served in a number of diplomatic capacities, including Singapore Ambassador to Germany (1998–2003) with an accreditation to Greece (2000–2003), and Singapore Ambassador to Belgium, with concurrent accreditation to the European Union, the Netherlands, Luxembourg and the Holy See.

Woon was appointed Second Solicitor-General in 2006 and subsequently Solicitor-General in 2007. He served as Attorney-General between 2008 and 2010.

== Early life and education ==
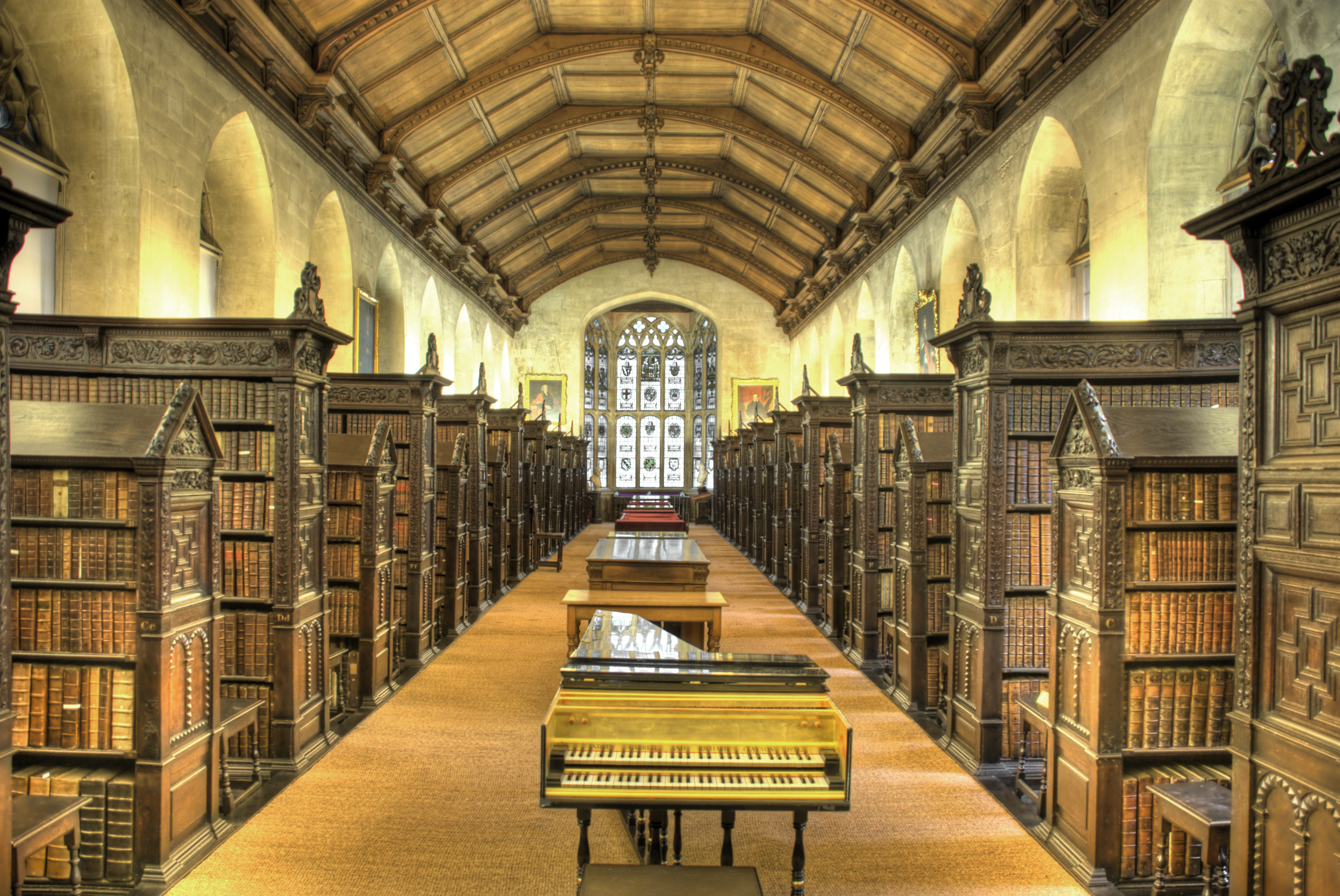
The Old Library of St. John's College, Cambridge

Woon, an ethnic Singaporean Chinese of Peranakan descent, was born on 12 September 1956 in Singapore to schoolteachers. He was a head prefect at Pasir Panjang Primary School (where his father became principal years later) and a prefect while at Raffles Institution. During his national service, he served as a member of Pioneer, the MINDEF magazine. Following his A-levels he was considering business administration, but ended up accepting a scholarship from DBS Bank to study law instead after it was suggested to him by the scholarship officer.

He earned his Bachelor of Laws (LL.B.) from the National University of Singapore (NUS), graduating in 1981 with first class honours. That same year, he also topped the postgraduate practice law course, winning the Aw Boon Haw and Aw Boon Par Memorial Prize. He joined the teaching staff of the NUS Faculty of Law that year, focusing his teaching and research on company law and securities regulation. In 1983 he graduated with a Master of Laws (LL.M.) degree with first class honours from St. John's College, Cambridge, which he completed on a Commonwealth Academic Staff scholarship.

== Career ==
=== Academic ===
Woon was called to the Singapore Bar in 1985. The first edition of his book Company Law was published in 1988. The same year he became a Sub-Dean of the NUS Faculty of Law, then served as Vice-Dean from 1991 to 1995. On 1 February 1999 Woon was appointed a professor of law. In November 1990, Woon appeared before the Parliamentary Select Committee on the Constitution of the Republic of Singapore (Amendment No. 3) Bill (Bill No. 23/90) to make representations on the proposed introduction of an elected President for Singapore. He took the view that since the elected president should be politically neutral, Cabinet members should only be eligible to stand for election five years after leaving politics.

Never afraid to speak his mind, in July 1991 in an interview by The Straits Times Woon commented: "We effectively don't have a Constitution. We have a law that can be easily changed by Parliament, and by the party in power because the party is Parliament. The changes themselves might not be controversial, but it is unsettling how flexible the Constitution is, unlike, say, in the United States." In reply, Prime Minister Goh Chok Tong pointed out that past changes to the Constitution had been made only with a two-thirds parliamentary majority and not done lightheartedly, as the intensive discussions and the two-year gestation period of the Elected President Bill proved. He affirmed that the Constitution had to evolve to reflect the changing needs of the people, and that it could not be assumed that the Constitution, drafted in 1965, would be the best Constitution for always and should be frozen in time. "So to say that because the Government in power changes the Constitution there is no Constitution is ridiculous, to put it mildly."

=== Nominated Member of Parliament ===
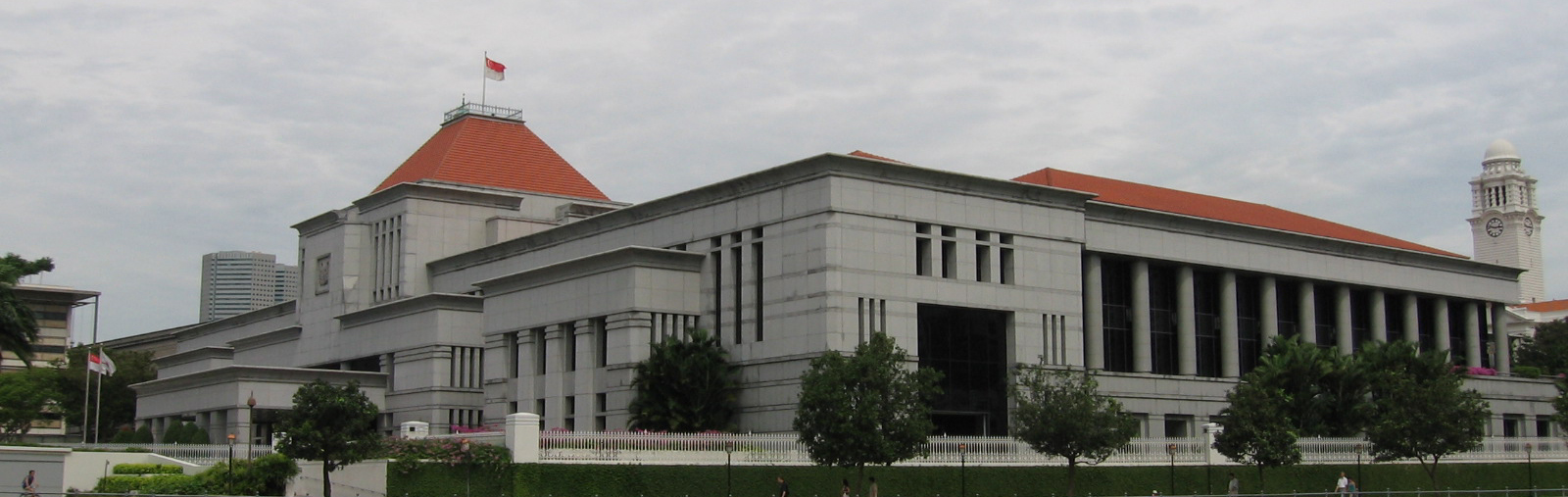
Parliament House, December 2005

Woon was a Nominated Member of Parliament (NMP) for three terms, from 7 September 1992 to 6 September 1994, from 7 September 1994 to 6 September 1996, and from 7 September 1996 till 15 December 1996 when Parliament was dissolved for the 1997 general election.

In 1992 at the start of the Government's annual Speak Mandarin Campaign, the Minister for Information and the Arts George Yeo said in a newspaper article that the rising use of English by Chinese Singaporeans was a "disturbing trend" as "[w]e become very exposed to Western cultural influences via books, magazines and films. Some influences are good. Others are harmful, especially to the structure of the family." This provoked Woon to respond that "[t]he subliminal message being sent is that those who speak English are dangerous to society and that the wider use of English threatens the social fabric of Singapore". He deplored this view because good values were neither Asian nor Western: "Why should we confine ourselves to one or the other? Singapore isn't a Western society. It isn't an Asian society. It is a cosmopolitan society." He noted that "[t]he emancipation of women, the rule of law, the equality of citizens irrespective of race, language or religion, the right to representative government: These are values we have adopted from the 'decadent' West."

In September 1992, Woon was appointed to the select committee to review the Companies (Amendment) Bill (Bill No. 33/92) which proposed, among other things, that scripless trading in securities listed on the Stock Exchange of Singapore be authorised so that share transfers can be made through computerised book entries. He was a director of Intraco Ltd. (1989–2000) and Natsteel Ltd. (1997–2001), both listed on the Stock Exchange.

On 23 May 1994, Woon moved a Private Member's Bill which was eventually passed by Parliament on 2 November 1995 as the Maintenance of Parents Act. The Act, which entitles parents at least 60 years old and unable to maintain themselves adequately to apply to a tribunal for their children to be ordered to pay maintenance to them, was the first public law that originated from a private member's bill since Singapore's independence in 1965. In its 5 December 1994 issue, Time magazine picked Woon as one of 100 young world leaders, the only Singaporean to make the list.

From 1995 to 1997, Woon was Legal Adviser to the President of Singapore and Council of Presidential Advisors. During this time, he represented the President as junior counsel before the Constitution of the Republic of Singapore Tribunal in Constitutional Reference No. 1 of 1995, which involved the interpretation of provisions of the Constitution of Singapore touching on the ability of Parliament to curtail the President's discretionary powers.

=== Diplomat ===
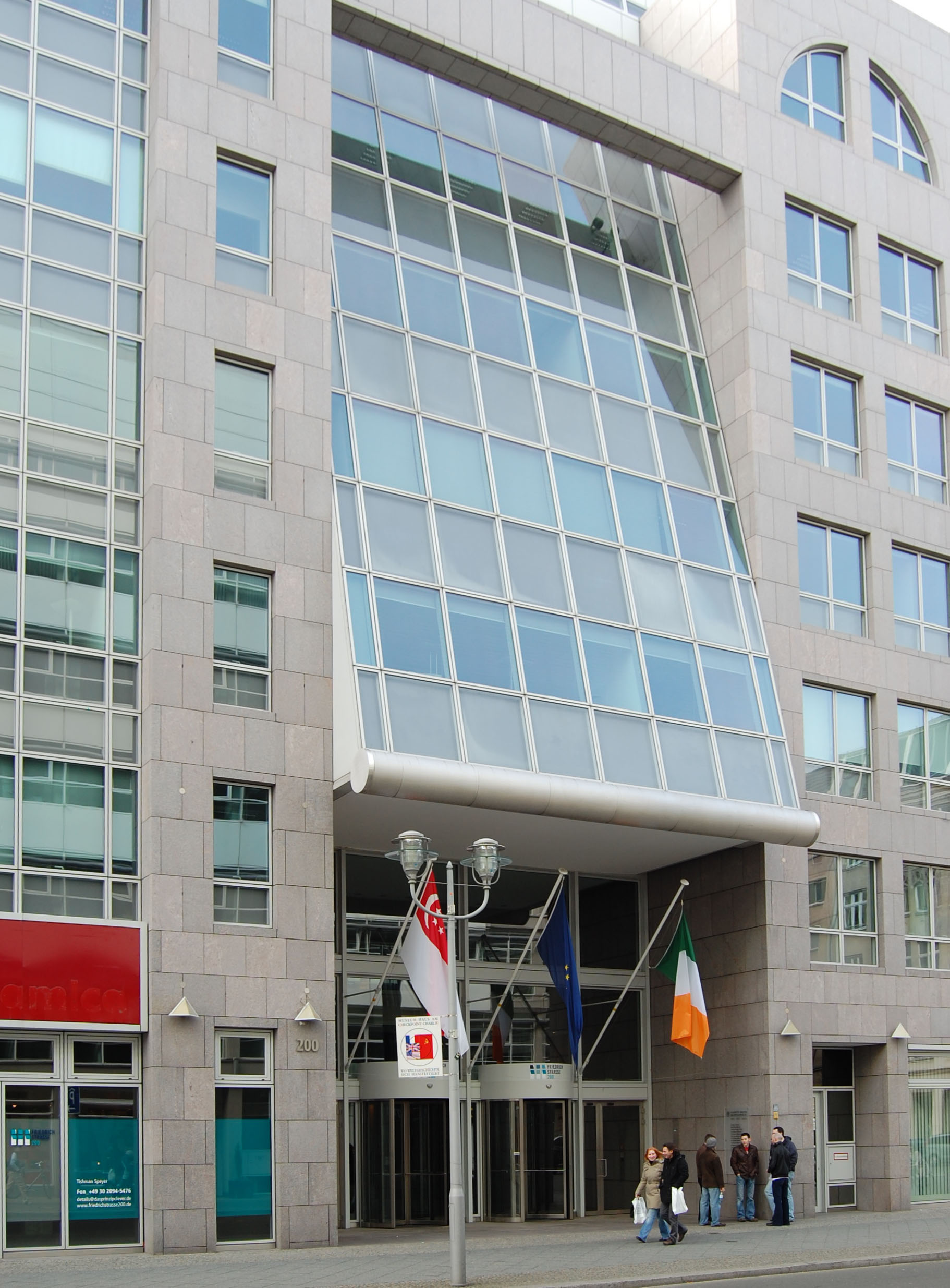
The Embassy of Singapore in Berlin in Philip-Johnson-Haus on Friedrichstraße

Between September 1997 and September 2006, Woon was seconded to the Foreign Service. He was Singapore's Ambassador to Germany from 6 February 1998 to July 2003, and was concurrently accredited to Greece from March 2000 to July 2003. He then served as Ambassador to Belgium (from 22 August 2003) with concurrent accreditation to the European Union, the Netherlands (from 22 October 2003), Luxembourg and the Holy See. In this capacity, he represented Singapore together with Deputy Prime Minister and Minister for Law S. Jayakumar at the funeral mass of Pope John Paul II in the Vatican City on 8 April 2005, believed to be the largest gathering of heads of state in history. In 2006, the Vatican made Woon a Knight Grand Cross of the Order of St. Gregory the Great, which is conferred on Roman Catholic men and women in recognition of their service to the Church, unusual labours, support of the Holy See, and the good example set in their communities and country.

=== Solicitor-General and Attorney-General ===
Woon was appointed to the post of Second Solicitor-General on 3 October 2006, and Solicitor-General on 2 July 2007. In 2007, he was also made a Senior Counsel. Between January 2007 and 31 March 2010, he was a member of the advisory board of the School of Law of the Singapore Management University. In February 2008, Woon was appointed by the Ministry of Finance to chair a steering committee to review the Companies Act.

Woon became Attorney-General on 11 April 2008. Three months into the job, he created some controversy when delivering an off-the-cuff speech at the launch of the Law Society of Singapore's Public and International Law Committee. He said:

[W]hen it comes to implementation [of human rights], there will be arguments about where the lines are to be drawn. And when there are new so-called rights, then there has to be debate – is it really a right? ... Just because some Western societies have accepted it, doesn't make it a human right. ... Many of these fanatics think: 'We've decided that this is human rights, therefore when Singapore does something, we're entitled to criticise them.' I say rubbish. You want to do it in your society, do it in your society. Don't come and tell us you draw the line for the rest of the world."

In mid-May, Woon commented that an acquitted person may not be guilty in law, but guilty in fact. Two months later, without referring directly to these remarks, Judge of Appeal V.K. Rajah wrote in a judgment that such comments could undermine confidence in the courts' verdicts and the criminal justice system, which was based on the doctrine of the presumption of innocence. The Minister for Law K. Shanmugam was asked in Parliament on 25 August 2008 to clarify the Attorney-General's comments. Shanmugam described the presumption of innocence as an "important and fundamental principle" which the Government was "absolutely committed to upholding". Nonetheless, it was "entirely possible for a person to have committed acts which amount to a crime and yet, there may be no conviction", as the trial process was designed to prove guilt and not innocence. He added: "It is for the courts, and the courts alone, to exercise judicial power and decide the question of guilt, in a trial."

With effect from 20 May 2008, Woon was appointed a director of the Monetary Authority of Singapore. He also served on the Presidential Council for Minority Rights between 2008 and 2010.

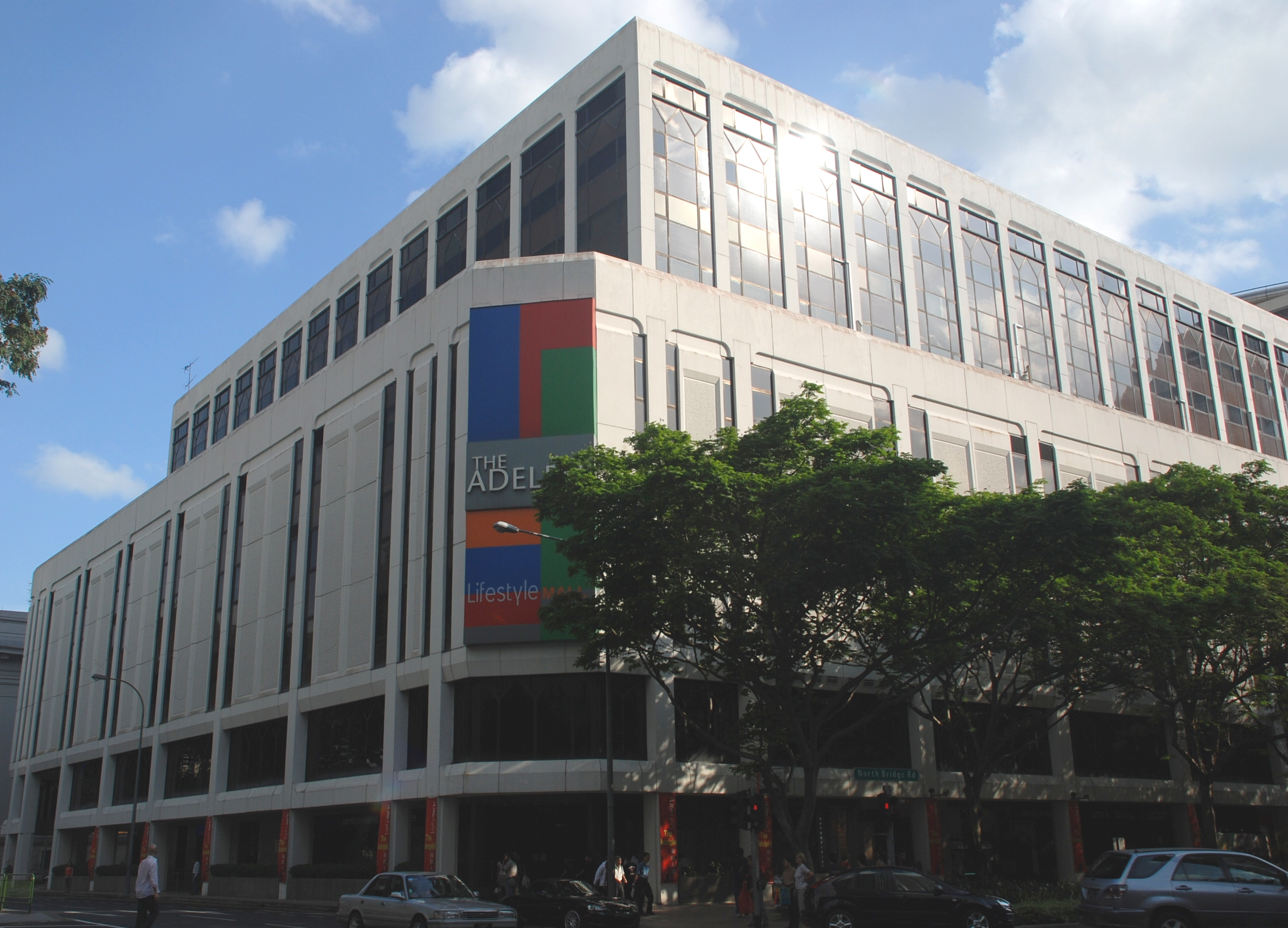
The Attorney-General's Chambers were formerly located in The Adelphi on Coleman Street

Woon was the first Attorney-General in more than ten years to personally appear in court. On 28 July 2008, he argued before the Court of Appeal that a woman, 24-year-old Aniza bte Essa, who had manipulated her 17-year-old teenage lover Muhammad Nasir bin Abdul Aziz into killing her husband should be given a life sentence. The Court held that life imprisonment was inappropriate due to the defendant's psychiatric condition, and affirmed the nine-year jail term imposed by the High Court. Nasir was detained indefinitely at the President's Pleasure for murder instead of receiving the death sentence as he was below 18 years old at the time he killed Manap bin Sarlip (Aniza's husband) and thus cannot be sentenced to hang under Singapore law. Woon elected to take proceedings against Tang Wee Sung, chairman of the company C.K. Tang which owns Tangs department store, for the illegal purchase of a human organ – a kidney – in the first case of its kind in Singapore. The decision to do so was criticised by Dr. Lee Wei Ling, Director of the National Neuroscience Institute and daughter of Minister Mentor and former Prime Minister Lee Kuan Yew, in an article published in The Straits Times on 5 September 2008. Woon replied, pointing out a number of misconceptions she held as to the facts and the law, and emphasising that the prosecution had been brought as no one was above the law. Subsequently, in response to further comments by Dr. Lee, he wrote an extended article entitled "Wrong Facts and Faulty Logic" that appeared in The Straits Times on 18 September 2008.

He also prosecuted a number of contempt of court cases, including suits against Dow Jones Publishing Company (Asia), Inc. for material published in The Wall Street Journal Asia; against US-based lawyer Gopalan Nair for comments on his blog; and against three Singapore Democratic Party supporters, John Tan Liang Joo, Isrizal bin Mohamed Isa and Muhammad Shafi'ie Syahmi bin Sariman, who wore T-shirts bearing the image of a kangaroo dressed in a judge's gown outside the Supreme Court Building. On 15 March 2010, in one of his last cases before his term of office ended, he defended the constitutionality of capital punishment in Singapore before the Court of Appeal in an appeal by Yong Vui Kong, a Malaysian who was sentenced to death for drug trafficking.

At the third annual Singapore Children's Society Lecture entitled "Changing Social Mores: Protecting Children from Themselves?" on 31 October 2009, Woon expressed the view that prosecuting teenagers from having underage sex with each other served little purpose. "It's basically kids having sex ... What do you do if the couple think they're in love? It's less easy if the girl consents. ... The judges cannot do very much by themselves. Sending them [the teenagers] to jail per se will not make them reflect on their lives. That is the last thing that is going to happen. But good or ill, this is the framework that we have."

Woon established a new division in the Attorney-General's Chambers for the prosecution of cases in the Subordinate Courts of Singapore to enhance the development of criminal litigation skills, and recruited a number of young and talented lawyers into the Singapore Legal Service. In 2008 he hosted the International Association of Prosecutors Conference in Singapore. He also assisted in the setting up of the Centre for International Law at NUS to improve international law expertise in Singapore and the region. He was Singapore's alternate representative on the High Level Task Force for the Drafting of the ASEAN Charter, a key constitutional document for ASEAN, which was signed in November 2007. Subsequently, he co-authored a book entitled The Making of the ASEAN Charter (2009).

Woon stepped down as Attorney-General on 10 April 2010 after a two-year term. In a media interview, he said that the post "was not a job I really wanted or enjoyed. I did it because I was asked to do the job. So I did my best under the circumstances with what I had." When asked whether he had "annoyed the powers that be", he said:

It's not unlikely that I have. Look, to be fair, nobody called me in the middle of the night to say you must do this, you must do that. ... Whether or not they're happy with me – this one you've got to ask PM [Prime Minister Lee Hsien Loong]. This is a mutual parting of the ways. Best to leave before you outstay your welcome, although I think amongst some people, I've already outstayed my welcome.

He subsequently clarified that when he said he had outstayed his welcome he had been "thinking more about the people I prosecuted rather than anything else", and that "I was kidding, I was being facetious".

=== Return to academia ===
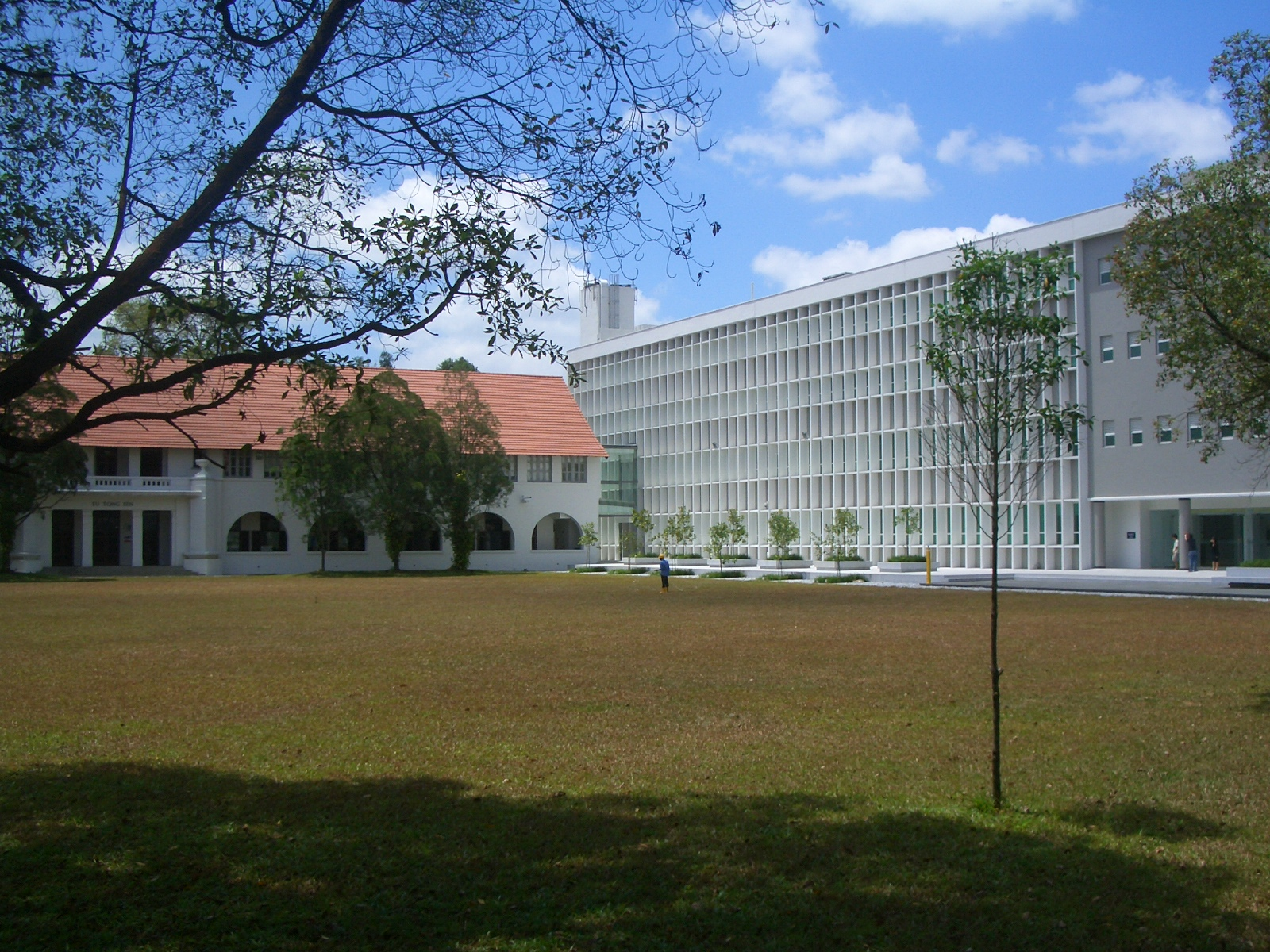
The National University of Singapore Faculty of Law at the university's Bukit Timah Campus, which Woon rejoined full-time in 2010

Woon returned to academia at NUS, and was appointed the first Dean of the Singapore Institute of Legal Education (SILE), a company incorporated by the Singapore Academy of Law on 18 January 2010 to manage the postgraduate practical training of graduates from local and overseas universities seeking admission to the Singapore Bar, training contracts, and continuing legal education for practising lawyers. He has denied any intention to enter politics – "Why would I leave one hot seat to jump into another hot seat? I've said for years that I would want to go back to my natural habitat eventually. Why wouldn't anyone believe me?" – although when asked if he had forever ruled out a political career, he said: "Forever is a long time but definitely not now." Subsequently, he reiterated in a Today interview: "I am not a politician and I am not interested in politics and have no desire to go into politics. I do not know why people do not believe me when I say so. I have said it a thousand times but people do not seem to believe me."

Woon is currently Chairman of the Singapore International Law Society (since 2006), Judge Advocate General (since 2007), and President of the Goethe Institute Singapore (since 2010). In 2015, Woon joined RHTLaw TaylorWessing LLP, one of the few largest law firms in Singapore, as its non-executive Chairman and Senior Consultant.

In September 2017, Woon wrote a piece in The Straits Times illuminating how the office of the Attorney-General carries out its prosecutorial function, and suggesting that this could be separated from its other role as legal advisor to the Government.

== Fiction writing ==
Woon won a consolation prize for a short story called The Body in Question which he submitted for the 1985 National Short Story Writing Competition. In 2002, he published his first novel, The Advocate's Devil. This was followed three years later by The Devil to Pay (2005). Both books are crime novels set in 1930s Singapore with Dennis Chiang, an English-educated Peranakan lawyer, as the protagonist. Woon has said that fiction writing was "something I did on the side when I got tired of writing non-fiction". A reviewer of The Advocate's Devil commented: "That the author is a lawyer first and promising novelist second is most glaring in the language used in Devil. ... This must be the first made-in-Singapore whodunnit that needs to be read with a dictionary at hand." Although the protagonist Chiang's "view of human beings other than himself is patronising at best" and might leave readers with a "rather sour aftertaste", the novel's "light touches of romance and compassion do much to lift the storyline" and had "masterful pacing". The final installment featuring Dennis Chiang, The Devil's Circle, was published in 2011. In 2021, The Devil's Circle was adapted into a fifteen episode television series, This Land is Mine, with Pierre Png portraying Dennis Chiang and Rebecca Lim as Dennis' cousin June Chiang.

== Selected works ==
=== Non-fiction ===
==== Articles ====
- "Precedents that Bind – A Gordian Knot: Stare Decisis in the Federal Court of Malaysia and the Court of Appeal, Singapore", Malaya Law Review, 24: 1–25, 1982.
- "Ultra Vires and Corporate Capacity in Singapore", Singapore Academy of Law Journal, 1: 52–67, 1989.
- "Some check is better than no check: Walter Woon reflects on opposition politics in Singapore", The Straits Times, 29 November 1990.
- "Protecting the Minority Shareholder", Singapore Academy of Law Journal, 4: 123–132, 1992.
- Woon, Walter (1993), "The Scripless Trading System in Singapore", International Journal of Law and Information Technology, 1 (1): 77–89, doi:10.1093/ijlit/1.1.77.
- "Regulation of the Securities Industry in Singapore", Pacific Rim Law and Policy Journal, 4: 731–755, 1995.
- "Crime and Punishment: The Problems of Sentencing", Singapore Law Review, 27: 1–11, 2009.

==== Book chapters ====
- Woon, Walter (c. 1980), "Protection of Shareholders and Investors", Papers on Duties & Liabilities of Company Directors in Public Listed Companies, Singapore: Professional Resources Agency.
- Woon, Walter; Chew, Margaret; Tjio, Hans (1986), "Securities Regulation in Singapore", in Rosen, Robert C. [et al.] (ed.), International Securities Regulation, [Dobbs Ferry, N.Y.]: Oceana Publications, ISBN 978-0-379-20825-2.
- Woon, Walter (1994), "Nominated MPs: Some Check is Better than No Check [ch. 3]", in da Cunha, Derek (ed.), Debating Singapore: Reflective Essays, Singapore: Institute of Southeast Asian Studies, pp. 15–18, ISBN 978-981-3016-82-8
- Woon, Walter (1997), "Securities Regulation [ch. 7]", in Chong, Amelyn (ed.), The Business Guide to Singapore, Singapore: Butterworth-Heinemann Asia, pp. 138–164, ISBN 978-981-00-6793-9.
- Woon, Walter (1997), "Singapore", in Tan, Poh-Ling (ed.), Asian Legal Systems: Law, Society, and Pluralism in East Asia, Sydney: Butterworths, ISBN 978-0-409-31008-5.
- Woon, Walter (1999), "The Applicability of English Law in Singapore [ch. 6] and The Doctrine of Judicial Precedent [ch. 8]", in Tan, Kevin Y L (ed.), The Singapore Legal System (2nd ed.), Singapore: Singapore University Press, pp. 230–248 and 297–323, ISBN 978-9971-69-212-4.

==== Books ====
- Woon, Walter C.M. (1986), Commercial Law of Singapore: An Introduction, Cambridge, Cambridgeshire; Dover, N.H.: Woodhead-Faulkner, ISBN 978-0-85941-281-0.
- Woon, Walter C.M. (1988), Company Law, Singapore: Longman Singapore Publishers, ISBN 978-9971-89-959-2. Later editions:
  - Woon, Walter C.M. (1997), Company Law (2nd ed.), Singapore: FT Law & Tax Asia Pacific, ISBN 978-981-3069-32-9.
  - Woon, Walter C.M. (1997), Company Law (2nd (student) ed.), Selangor, Malaysia: Sweet & Maxwell Asia, ISBN 978-983-9088-51-9.
  - Tan, Cheng Han; Woon, Walter C.M. (2009), Walter Woon on Company Law (3rd ed.), Singapore: Sweet & Maxwell/Thomson Reuters, ISBN 978-981-08-2593-5.
- Woon, Walter C.M., ed. (1989), The Singapore Legal System, Singapore: Longman, ISBN 978-9971-89-962-2. Later edition:
  - Tan, Kevin Y L, ed. (1999), The Singapore Legal System (2nd ed.), Singapore: Singapore University Press, ISBN 978-9971-69-212-4.
- Woon, Walter C.M.; Hicks, Andrew (1989), The Companies Act of Singapore: An Annotation, Singapore: Butterworths Asia, ISBN 978-0-409-99568-8. Later editions:
  - Woon, Walter C.M. (1994), Woon's Corporations Law, Singapore: LexisNexis, ISBN 978-0-409-99692-0.
  - Woon, Walter C.M. (2005), Woon's Corporations Law, Singapore: LexisNexis, ISBN 978-0-409-99692-0.
- Woon, Walter C.M. (1994), Regionalisation of Corporate & Securities Law: The Singapore and Malaysia Experience, [Brisbane]: Asia Pacific Economic Law Forum, OCLC 221428384.
- Woon, Walter Cheong Ming, ed. (1994), Malaysian and Singapore Company and Securities Law Reports, Singapore: Butterworths Asia, ISBN 978-0-409-99695-1.
- Woon, Walter C.M. (1995), Basic Business Law in Singapore, Singapore; New York: Prentice Hall, ISBN 978-981-00-2888-6. Later edition:
  - Woon, Walter C.M. (2000), Basic Business Law in Singapore (2nd ed.), Singapore: Prentice Hall, ISBN 978-981-4058-25-4.
- Woon, Walter C.M.; Hicks, Andrew (1996), The Companies Act of Malaysia: An Annotation, Singapore: Butterworths Asia, ISBN 978-0-409-99834-4.
- Woon, Walter C.M. (1997), Butterworths' Annotated Statutes of Singapore: Companies and Securities, Singapore: Butterworths Asia, ISBN 978-0-409-99843-6.
- Woon, Walter C.M. (1998), Butterworths Handbook of Singapore Securities Law, Singapore: Butterworths Asia, ISBN 978-0-409-99938-9.
- Koh, Tommy; Manalo, Rosario G.; Woon, Walter, eds. (2009), The Making of the ASEAN Charter, Hackensack, N.J.: World Scientific Publishing Co., doi:10.1142/6978, ISBN 978-981-283-390-7.

=== Fiction ===
- Woon, Walter C.M. (2002), The Advocate's Devil, Singapore: Times Books International, ISBN 978-981-232-393-4.
- Woon, Walter C.M. (2005), The Devil to Pay, Singapore: Marshall Cavendish Editions, ISBN 978-981-261-235-9.
- Woon, Walter C.M. (2011), The Devil's Circle, Singapore: Marshall Cavendish Editions, ISBN 978-981-443-581-9.

== Notes ==
Preceded by Chao Hick Tin	Attorney-General of Singapore; 11 April 2008 – 10 April 2010	Succeeded by Sundaresh Menon
Preceded by Chan Seng Onn	Solicitor-General of Singapore; 2 July 2007 – 10 April 2008	Succeeded by Koh Juat Jong
