= Herbert Cox (judge) =

British barrister and colonial judge

Sir Herbert Cox

Chief Justice of Northern Rhodesia
- In office 1945–1951
- Preceded by: Cyril Gerard Brooke Francis
- Succeeded by: Sir Arthur Werner Lewey

Chief Justice of Tanganyika
- In office 1951–1956
- Preceded by: George Graham Paul
- Succeeded by: Edward John Davies

Chief Justice of Bechuanaland
- In office 1957–1961
- Preceded by: Harold Curwen Willan
- Succeeded by: Peter Watkin-Williams

Personal details
- Born: 1893 British Guiana
- Died: 21 September 1973 (aged 79–80)
- Occupation: Lawyer, judge

Sir Herbert Charles Fahie Cox (1893 – 21 September 1973) was a British lawyer who served in various positions in the colonial legal service, including chief justice of Northern Rhodesia, Tanganyika and Bechuanaland.

== Career ==
=== Early years (1893–1933) ===
Herbert Charles Fahie Cox was the second son of the Hon. Charles Thomas Fox, Government Secretary. He was born in 1893 in British Guiana and educated in the United Kingdom. He attended Reading School, and was admitted to the Middle Temple on 31 December 1910.

Cox joined the colonial legal service, and in 1913 was appointed acting sub-inspector of police in British Guiana. He was called to the bar at Middle Temple in absence on 28 April 1915. In 1915 he became sub-inspector of police in British Guiana (now Guyana), holding office until his resignation in 1919. In 1920 he was appointed assistant to the attorney-general of British Guiana.

In 1925 Cox was appointed attorney-general of the Bahamas. During a debate in the Legislative Council in 1926 Cox argued in favour of making San Salvador Island the primary name of Watling's Island, while Watling's Island would remain a subsidiary name. It was thought that this was the first island where Christopher Columbus had made landfall in 1492. In 1929 he became attorney-general of Gibraltar.

=== Nigeria (1933–1946) ===
Fox was appointed solicitor-general of Nigeria in 1933. In 1935 he was appointed attorney-general of Nigeria. In 1942 Cox made a major attempt to revise the culture associated with Dane guns, or locally made firearms. He presented a bill to the Legislative Council under which a free permit would be granted to every firearm owner "considered [a] proper person." However, that person would need a license to use a firearm. His goal was "to ascertain exactly where and in whose custody" guns were.

=== Northern Rhodesia and Tanganyika (1946–1956) ===
On 4 February 1946 Herbert Charles Fahie Cox, Attorney-General, Nigeria, was appointed Chief Justice of the High Court of Northern Rhodesia (now Zambia). In June 1946 Cox received a knighthood. In November 1951 Herbert Charles Fahie Cox, K.C., Chief Justice, Northern Rhodesia was appointed Chief Justice, Tanganyika. He held office in Tanganyika from 1952 to 1956.

=== Last years (1956–1973) ===
In February 1956 Sir Herbert Cox, Q.C., lately Chief Justice in Tanganyika, was appointed chairman of a Commission of Inquiry into the recent disturbances in Sierra Leone against the increases in hut tax. The commission was to inquire into the causes of the disturbances and the action taken to deal with them, and to make recommendations. In 1957 Cox was appointed Chief Justice of Basutoland, Bechuanaland and Swaziland (BBS) in place of Harold Curwen Willan (1896-1971), who had left office in 1956. In 1961 Peter Watkin-Williams became Chief Justice of BBS.

Cox became a member of the Dorset County Court in September 1963, and chairman of the Wiltshire Quarter Sessions in August 1964. He died on 21 September 1973.

== Publications ==
- Justice and the Law, Foreword by Sir Herbert Charles Fahie Cox (2 ed.), Northern Rhodesia and Nyasaland Joint Publications Bureau [by] Oxford University Press, 1956, p. 67

== Sources ==
- Bahamas Handbook 2003, International Publication Service, 15 November 2002, ISBN 978-0-914755-75-3
- Colonial Office (1935), Tanganyika Under United Kingdom Administration: Report by Her Majesty's Government in the United Kingdom of Great Britain and Northern Ireland to the General Assembly of the United Nations, H.M. Stationery Office
- "Colonies, Protectorates, etc." (PDF), The London Gazette, 13 June 1946
- "Downing Street", The London Gazette (37457): 818, 5 February 1946
- Hare (22 February 1956), "Sierra Leone (Disturbances)", Hansard, 549
- Middle Temple Register of Admissions July 1501 to December 1944 (PDF), Middle Temple, archived from the original (PDF) on 16 January 2021
- "News", Kingston Gleaner: 6, 20 October 1956
- Parsons, Neil; Gumbo, Glorious (16 November 2002), Bechuanaland Colonial Administrators c.1884-c.1965, University of Botswana History Department
- Saheed Aderinto (25 January 2018), Guns and Society in Colonial Nigeria: Firearms, Culture, and Public Order, Indiana University Press, ISBN 978-0-253-03162-4
- "The Church House, Westminster, SW1", The London Gazette, 23 November 1951
- Wright, Tim (2019), "13 Post-War Reconstruction 1946-1953", A History Of The Northern Rhodesia Police, Northern Rhodesia Police Association
