= Ernest Pattison Shanks =

British lawyer and colonial official (1911–1994)

Ernest Pattison Shanks QC
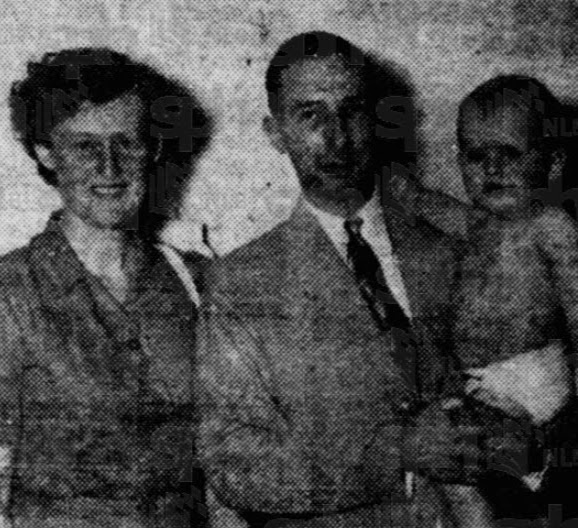
- Shanks in 1950

Attorney-General of Singapore
- In office 1957–1959
- Preceded by: Charles Harris Butterfield
- Succeeded by: Ahmad Mohamed Ibrahim

Personal details
- Born: 11 January 1911
- Died: 18 January 1994 (aged 83) Guernsey
- Children: 3 sons and 1 daughter
- Education: Downing College, Cambridge

Ernest Pattison Shanks (11 January 1911 – 18 January 1994) was a British lawyer who served as Attorney-General of Singapore from 1957 to 1959.

== Early life and education ==
Shanks was born on 11 January 1911, the eldest son of Hugh Shanks. He was educated at Mill Hill School and Downing College, Cambridge. In 1936, he was called to the Bar by the Inner Temple.

== Career ==
Shanks joined the Northeastern circuit after qualifying. He served as Senior Reserve Officer in the Middlesex Regiment from 1939 to 1944, and in Princess Louise’s Kensington Regiment in France, where he was mentioned in despatches, Sicily and Italy. From 1944 to 1946, he served at the Staff College, Camberley, and in 1946 was appointed Senior Legal Officer in the military government, Germany, with the rank of Lt-Colonel, Regimental Administrative Officer.

Shanks joined the Colonial Legal Service in 1946, and was appointed District Judge, Terengganu, Malaya. In the following year, he went to Singapore where he served as District Judge, and was appointed Queen's Counsel (1947). In 1949, he was appointed chairman of the committee tasked with reviewing liquor licensing laws. On occasion, he was called on to act as Solicitor-General and Attorney-General.

Shanks subsequently served as Solicitor-General of Singapore, remaining in the post until 1957. In December 1957, he briefly served as Officer Administering the Government after the departure of governor, Sir Robert Black, and before the arrival of his successor, Sir William Goode. In 1957, he was appointed Attorney-General of Singapore while also serving as Minister of Legal Affairs from 1957 to 1959. Serving as the last expatriate Attorney-General of Singapore, his appointment was criticised by some members under the Malayanisation policy on his first appearance in the Legislative Assembly as ex-officio member.

After retiring from the Colonial Legal Service, Shanks settled in Guernsey where he served as Comptroller and Procureur of the Royal Court of Guernsey. He retired in 1976.

== Personal life and death ==
Shanks married Audrey Moore in 1937 and they had one son. In 1947, he married Betty Battersby and they had two sons and one daughter.

Shanks died on 18 January 1994, aged 83.
