= Chief Justice of Zanzibar =

The chief justice of Zanzibar is the highest judge of Zanzibar, part of the state of the United Republic of Tanzania. He is appointed by the president of Zanzibar in consultation with the Judicial Services Commission and presides over the High Court for Zanzibar.

== History ==
Zanzibar became a British protectorate following the Anglo-German Agreement of 1890. An Order of Council created Her Britannic Majesty's Court for Zanzibar with a presiding judge in 1897 and another order established the High Court in 1925. The protectorate gained its independence in December 1963 as a constitutional monarchy inside the Commonwealth and after a revolution a month later was transformed into the Republic of Zanzibar and Pemba.

In 1964 it merged with Tanganyika into the United Republic of Tanganyika and Zanzibar, which later in that year was renamed to United Republic of Tanzania. Despite the unification both parts of the new state retained their former judicial systems.

== Chief judges of Zanzibar ==
- 1897–1901: Walter Borthwick Cracknall
- 1901–1904: George Bettesworth Piggott
- 1904–1914: Lindsey Smith
- 1915–1919: James William Murison
- 1919–1925: Thomas Symonds Tomlinson

== Chief justices of Zanzibar ==
- 1925–1928: Thomas Symonds Tomlinson
- 1928–1933: George Hunter Pickering
- 1934–1939: Charles Ewan Law
- 1939–1941: John Verity
- 1941–1952: John Milner Gray
- 1952–1955: George Gilmour Robinson
- 1955–1959: Ralph Windham
- 1959–1964: Gerald MacMahon Mahon
- 1964–1969: Revolutionary Council (Chief Justice: Geoffrey Jonas Horsfall)
- 1970–1978: Ali Haji Pandu
- 1978-1989: Augustino Ramadhani
- 1985–2011: Hamid Mahmoud Hamid
- 2011–2021 Omar Makungu
- 2021-Khamis Ramadhan Abdalla

== See also ==
- Chief Justice of Tanzania
