= Paul Jousse =

Paul Jousse (died 1945) was a South African white trader in Bechuanaland.

Jousse was a manager for the Bechuanaland Trading Association (BTA). Writing under the name Inquisitor in the South African press, he criticised what he called the 'monopoly' of Khama III, who had bought out Garrett, Smith and Co. and started competing against the BTA.

== Works ==
- (as Inquisitor) Khama the King: Truth about the Bechuanas, Johannesburg: Central News Agency, 1914.
