= Walter Huggard =

British barrister

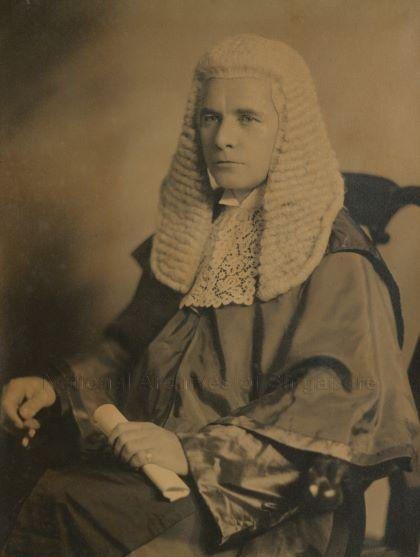
Huggard in 1929

Sir Walter Clarence Huggard QC (d. 21 June 1957) was a British barrister, acting High Commissioner for the Bechuanaland Protectorate and Swaziland and Chief Justice of the Straits Settlements.

== Education ==
Sir Walter was educated at Methodist College Belfast and Trinity College Dublin where he was First Honourman and Senior Moderator in Legal and Political Science. He received an LLD and was called to the Bar at King's Inn in 1907.

== Career ==
In 1914 he became a magistrate in Nigeria and in 1920 was appointed Solicitor General for Trinidad and Tobago. Huggard took silk in 1921. The following year he became Attorney General of Trinidad and Tobago and was Attorney General for the Kenya Colony from 1926 to 1929 (a position which also gave him a seat in the Legislative Council) and Attorney General for the Straits Settlements from 1929 to 1933. Huggard was knighted in 1933. He was succeeded as Attorney General of the Straits Settlements by Percy McElwaine. From 1933 to 1936 he served as Chief Justice of the Straits Settlements.

Sir Walter was later Judge of the High Courts of Basutoland, the Bechuanaland Protectorate and Swaziland and was legal advisor to the High Commissioner from 1937. In 1938, 1940, 1942, 1945 and 1946 he fulfilled the role of acting High Commissioner for the Bechuanaland Protectorate and Swaziland.

In 1948 he retired.

== Personal life ==
He married Kathleen Norah in 1915.

Sir Walter died in Hermanus near Cape Town.
