= Harold Curwen Willan =

British barrister and colonial judge (1896-1971)

Sir Harold Curwen Willan CMG
- Born: 29 February 1896
- Died: 11 December 1971 (aged 75)
- Education: Jesus College, Oxford
- Occupations: Barrister, colonial judge and chief justice
- Years active: 1920-1968
- Children: 1 son

Sir Harold Curwen Willan CMG (29 February 1896 – 11 December 1971) was a British barrister, senior judge and chief justice, who served in Malaya, East Africa and South Africa.

== Early life and education ==
Willan was born on 29 February 1896. He was educated at Kendal School, Westmorland and Jesus College, Oxford where he received his BA. He was called to the Bar of the Inner Temple, and in 1915 he joined the Inns of Court Officer Training Corps. From 1916-17, he served as Lieutenant in the Royal Regiment of Artillery of the British Expeditionary Force (BEF) in France, and was awarded the MC.

== Career ==
Willan went to Malaya in 1920 as a cadet attached to the District Office, Batang Padang, becoming a passed cadet in Malay in 1923, after which he was appointed District Officer, Jelebu. Later he became Assistant District Officer, Kuala Kangsar; Director of Public Prosecutions, Federated Malay States; Acting District Registrar and First Magistrate, Malacca, and Deputy Legal Adviser Federated Malay States. He was appointed District Judge, Straits Settlements in 1932, and Deputy Legal Adviser, Federated Malay States in 1934.

In 1937, he was appointed Solicitor General of Kenya, and served as Chairman of the Labour Commission in 1939. In 1940, he was appointed Attorney-General of Zanzibar where he was awarded the Brilliant Star of Zanzibar. In 1941, he was Legal Adviser, Civil Affairs, East Africa Command, and also acted as Chief Political Officer. In 1942, he was appointed President of the High Court of Ethiopia.

In 1945, he returned to Malaya as Deputy Chief Civil Affairs Officer, Malay Peninsula, with rank of Brigadier and was mentioned twice in dispatches. He served as Chief Justice of the Malayan Union in 1946 and of the Federation of Malaya from 1948 to 1950. In 1952, he served as Chief Justice, Basutoland, the Bechuanaland Protectorate and Swaziland. From 1952 to 1956 he served as Chief Justice of the United Kingdom High Commission Territories in South Africa, and from 1962 to 1968 he was Commissioner, Foreign Compensation Commission (FCC) serving as Vice-Chairman from 1967 to 1968.

== Personal life and death ==
Willan married Marjorie Rigg in 1922 and they had one son. He died on 11 December 1971.

== Honours ==
Willan was created a Knight Bachelor in the 1947 Birthday Honours. He was appointed Companion of the Order of St Michael and St George (CMG) in the 1946 New Years Honours. In 1917, he was awarded the Military Cross (MC).
