= John Davies (judge) =

Welsh lawyer and judge (1898–1969)

Sir Edward John Davies QC (20 February 1898 – 5 October 1969) was a Welsh lawyer and colonial judge, who served as Solicitor-General of Trinidad (1935–38), Solicitor-General (1941–46) and Attorney-General (1946–55) of Singapore, and Chief Justice of Tanganyika (1955–60).

== Early life and education ==
Edward John Davies was born on 20 February 1898 to Dan Davies and his wife, Mary Elizabeth David. He attended Llandovery College and the University of Wales.

== Career ==
From 1915, Davies fought in Flanders during the First World War; he then took up a legal career. After being called to the bar in 1922, Davies joined Sir Patrick Hastings' chambers and was active in the London and South-West circuits. In 1927, he was appointed a Crown Counsel in Kenya and six years later moved to the Gold Coast as a Senior Crown Counsel. In 1935, he became Solicitor-General of Trinidad, and his obituary in The Times remarks that "The legal profession there considered Davies to be in the top class as an advocate both as regards presentation of his cases and his manner in court". After three years, he became Deputy Legal Adviser to the Federated Malay States, before being appointed Solicitor-General of Singapore in 1941. The following year, the Japanese occupied the city and Davies was imprisoned at the Changi prisoner of war camp for the rest of the Second World War. The year after hostilities ended, Davies was appointed Singapore's Attorney-General. In 1955, Davies was appointed Chief Justice of Tanganyika on the retirement of Sir Herbert Cox; he served in the post until retiring in 1960, when Ralph Windham succeeded him.

Davies, who had been appointed Queen's Counsel in Singapore in 1948, was knighted in 1958. He died on 5 October 1969, leaving a widow, Ada Alberta Carlota de Rodriguez.

Legal offices
Preceded by Louis Devaux	Solicitor-General of Trinidad; 1935–1938	Succeeded by Sir Joseph Henri Maxime de Comarmond
Preceded by Sir Newnham Worley (As Solicitor-General, Straits Settlements)	Solicitor-General of Singapore; 1941–1946	Succeeded by Sir Guy Henderson
Preceded by Lt-Col. T. C. Spenser-Wilkinson (As Chief Legal Officer, BMA)	Attorney-General of Singapore; 1946–1955	Succeeded by Charles Butterfield
Preceded by Sir Herbert Cox	Chief Justice of Tanganyika; 1955–1960	Succeeded by Sir Ralph Windham
