= William Collyer (lawyer) =

English cricketer

Personal information
- Full name: William Robert Collyer
- Born: 11 January 1842; Camberwell, London
- Died: 27 October 1928 (aged 86); Hackford Hall, Reepham, Norfolk
- Batting: Right-handed

Domestic team information
- Years: Team
- 1864–1880: Norfolk
- 1864: Cambridge University
- Only FC: 12 May 1864 Cambridge University v MCC
- Source: Cricinfo, 12 March 2017

William Robert Collyer ISO (11 January 1842 – 27 October 1928) was an English lawyer who became the attorney general of the Straits Settlements at the start of the 20th century. In his youth he played first-class cricket for Cambridge University.

Collyer was born at Camberwell in Surrey in 1842, the second son of John and Georgina Collyer. His father was a judge in Norfolk and the family lived at Hackford Hall near Reepham, Norfolk. He was educated at Rugby School before going up to Caius College, Cambridge. He played cricket for his school in 1861 and in 1864 played for Cambridge University against MCC in his only first-class match. He played regularly for a variety of sides in non first-class matches, most frequently for Gentlemen of Norfolk and Norfolk sides, both before and after the foundation of Norfolk County Cricket Club in 1876. In 1866 he made a score of 160 for the Gentlemen of Norfolk to help defeat the Gentlemen of Lincolnshire, a match noted in his Wisden obituary. The same obituary noted that Scores and Biographies had described him as "a good batsman" who was "pretty successful in the matches in which he has participated".

Professionally, Collyer was initially a teacher after graduating in 1865, serving as an Assistant Master at Clifton College until 1867. He was admitted to the Inner Temple in 1866 and called to the bar in 1869. he served as judge in Norfolk and the Midlands before being appointed as the Acting Chief Justice of British Sierra Leone in 1879. He served as the Acting Attorney General of the Gold Coast between 1880 and 1882 and was Queen's Advocate in Cyprus until 1894, before being appointed at the Attorney General of Straits Settlements.

On his retirement Collyer was awarded the Imperial Service Order. He died at Hackford Hall in 1928 at the age of 86. His brother, Daniel Collyer, who became a clergyman, played cricket with him in a Norfolk side in 1869.
