= James William Murison =

Scottish colonial judge (1872–1945)

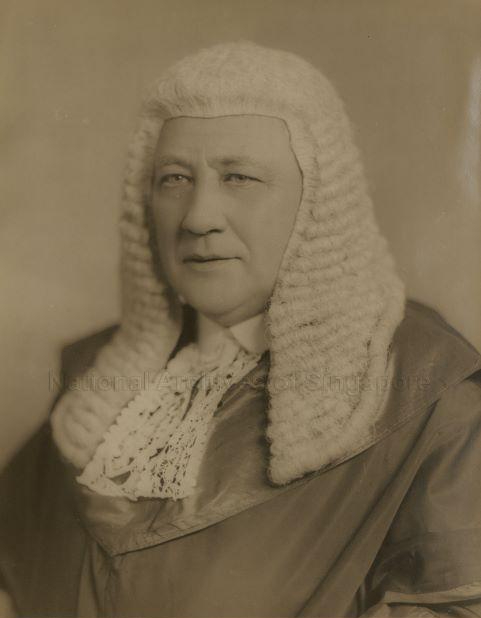
Murison in 1925

Sir James William Murison (23 March 1872 – 28 August 1945) was a Scottish colonial judge. He was Chief Justice of the Straits Settlements from 1925 to 1933, and, before that, Chief Judge of Zanzibar. He chaired the Murison Committee, a commission set up to study the incidents leading to the violent outbreak and the course of events between 13 October and 3 November 1933, in Palestine, and estimate the damage done to property and loss of life. The commission's report was published in the Palestine Gazette and, after presenting its outline of the causes and events of the disturbances, concluded that while an "Arab crowd in Palestine is mercurial and excitable and when excited, dangerous", the British colonial Palestine Police Force had in its response "acted with restraint and forbearance".

He was born in Aberdeen, the younger son of academic Alexander Falconer Murison. He attended St Olave's Grammar School and Trinity Hall, Cambridge. He was admitted at the Middle Temple in 1893 and called to the bar in 1896. He worked as a conveyancer in 1900 and then entered the colonial service in Africa in 1902. He was knighted in 1919.
