= Thio Shen Yi =

Singaporean senior counsel

Thio Shen Yi SC is a Singaporean lawyer who is a managing partner of the TSMP Law Corporation, alongside his wife Stefanie Yuen-Thio. He served as the president of the Law Society of Singapore in 2015 and 2016.

== Education ==
Thio completed an undergraduate law degree at the University of Cambridge in 1991, and was subsequently awarded first prize in the Council for Legal Bar Examination in 1992, topping his cohort for the UK Bar Examinations.

== Career ==
Thio undertook his training at Drew & Napier, where he trained under Davinder Singh. Thio was one of the founding members of TSMP Law Corporation, which was named after his mother Thio Su Mien. He and his wife Stefanie Yuen-Thio are its joint-managing partners. He joined the firm from Rajah & Tann.

Thio was appointed Senior Counsel of the Supreme Court of Singapore in 2008.

From 2015 to 2016, Thio was president of the Law Society of Singapore. In that capacity, Thio advocated for accused persons to be given earlier access to legal counsel, pointing out that Singapore's criminal justice system was "an outlier" that placed emphasis on "efficacy of investigations over protection of suspects". This topic received public attention when a 14-year-old boy suicided after having been brought in for questioning by police; Thio commented on the incident in the Law Society's newsletter Law Gazette, pointing out that as a vulnerable suspect, the child was not accompanied by a "parent, guardian or lawyer" during the police interview. Law and Home Affairs Minister K. Shanmugam responded to the piece in parliament, criticising it for implying that "police intimidation" had caused the death; and socio-political commentator Calvin Cheng also sought for him to step down. Thio issued a clarification that it was not his intention to criticise the police. Other issues Thio addressed during his tenure include the expansion of legal aid schemes to cover a wider range of criminal offences and provide pro bono legal assistance to more applicants, as well as managing a glut of law graduates flooding the job market.

In 2021, Thio included in lifestyle magazine Tatler's list of 59 "Asia's Most Influential SG" in the Public Service & Law category.

As of 2022, Thio is an independent director of Keppel Infrastructure Trust. Thio was awarded the SAL Merit Award in 2022. He also sits as the Chair of the International Relations Committee of the Law Society of Singapore.

Thio is a Fellow of the Singapore Institute of Arbitrators, and serves as a panel arbitrator of the Singapore International Arbitration Centre, and the Asian International Arbitration Centre. He is also a specialist mediator in the Singapore International Mediation Centre.

Thio has been described as "an influential figure in the legal community and a "top corporate lawyer and litigator" and is elsewhere said to be a "leading figure in Singapore’s legal community"

At the end of 2025, it was reported in the Straits Times that Thio's firm was commissioned to undertake an investigation into allegations of workplace bullying in the Law Society, a report that was responded to by the President of the Law Society.

== Personal life ==
Thio is married to Stefanie Yuen-Thio, who is joint-managing partner of TSMP Law Corporation. Thio is the brother of Thio Li-Ann, a professor at the NUS Faculty of Law. Thio's mother is Thio Su Mien, a former dean of the NUS Faculty of Law. Thio's father is Olympian Thio Gim Hock, who was the chief executive of real estate developer OUE and the Port of Singapore's Acting Port Engineer. Thio is an advocate for gender diversity.

Thio co-founded with his wife the #GivingBack Foundation through the Community Foundation of Singapore.

In 2022, it was reported that Thio was one of the victims of a large-scale "nickel scam" in which he had invested $87,000.
