= Community Mediation Centre (Singapore) =

Community Mediation Centre logo

The Community Mediation Centres (CMCs) in Singapore come under the purview of the Ministry of Law. The work of the CMCs is overseen by the Community Mediation Unit (CMU), a department set up within the Ministry of Law to run CMCs’ day to day operations as well as promote the use of mediation in Singapore.

== Overview ==
Set up with a view to providing Singaporeans with an accessible platform to resolve community and social disputes in an amicable manner, Singapore’s first CMC was established in 1998, following recommendations in 1997 by an inter-agency Committee on Alternative Dispute Resolution (ADR). The CMCs Act became law in 1998, providing for the establishment of the CMCs.

The CMU’s mission is to provide mediation services for social, community or family disputes that do not involve an arrestable (seizable) offence under any written law.

There are currently two CMCs at accessible locations in Singapore: CMC (Central), located at The Treasury and CMC (State Courts), located within the State Courts’ building.

== History ==
In March 1996, Professor S Jayakumar, then Minister for Law, tasked an inter-agency Committee to explore how Alternative Dispute Resolution (ADR) processes, in particular, mediation, could be further promoted in Singapore. This led to the formation of a Committee on ADR in May 1996, chaired by then Senior Parliamentary Secretary, Associate Professor Ho Peng Kee, and comprising representatives from the Ministry of Law, Ministry of Community Development, Ministry of Home Affairs, the Courts, Attorney General's Chambers, the Singapore Academy of Law, the National University of Singapore, the Singapore International Arbitration Centre, the Law Society of Singapore and Members of Parliament.

In July 1997, the Committee on ADR submitted a report to the Government, recommending that less expensive and non-adversarial methods of dispute resolution should be introduced in order to prevent Singaporean society from becoming too litigious. These should cater to a wide range of social and community conflicts. Noting that mediation reflects important aspects of traditions and cultures that are worthy of preservation, the Committee on ADR recommended that mediation, in particular, should be promoted to resolve social and community disputes. Pursuant to the recommendations of the Committee, the Ministry of Law set up the CMCs to help promote a more harmonious, civil and gracious society, where social conflicts are resolved amicably without resort to litigation in the Courts.

== About Community Mediation in Singapore ==
Mediation sessions at the CMCs are facilitated by a panel of trained volunteer mediators, who guide parties through discussion of the issues and assist them in reaching a mutually acceptable solution. The CMCs’ volunteer mediators come from a wide range of backgrounds, many of whom also actively serve as Justice of the Peace (JP), senior grassroots and community leaders.

== Types of Disputes CMC handles ==
The CMCs cater to community disputes, as opposed to commercial, legal or contractual disputes. The wide range types of disputes handled by the CMCs include relational disputes, such as quarrels between neighbours (e.g. noise, laundry dripping, corridor obstruction disputes), family conflicts (e.g. maintenance of elderly or disabled family members, spouse, parent-child), arguments, squabbles, spats, tiffs, quarrels and disagreements between friends, lovers, colleagues, landlord-tenant, hawker or shop-owner squabbles (e.g. placement of products) and conflicts between strangers (e.g. verbal or insulting gestures, utterance of unacceptable words, display of unacceptable behaviour or conduct, interest-free monetary matter based on verbal agreement involving less than S$5000).

Either parties can voluntarily approach the CMCs directly for assistance by visiting a CMC, calling their hotline at 1800-2255-529 or enquiry/registration through their website at https://www.mlaw.gov.sg/content/cmc/en.html.

Disputes may also be referred to the CMC for voluntary mediation by the Police, HDB, Town Council, Members of Parliament, Legal Aid Bureau or other community-based agency.

In accordance with the Community Mediation Centres Act, Cap 49A, for the purposes of mediation and the Community Mediation Centre’s procedures thereof and under Sec 152(2) of the Criminal Procedure Code (Cap.68), should the referral be made by SPF and you subsequently fail or refuse to attend the mediation session, the Magistrate may dismiss any future complaints on the matter if you do not provide any reasonable grounds for such failure or refusal.

Under the CMCs Act, where deemed appropriate, Magistrates also have the power to refer Magistrate Complaints to the CMCs for mandatory mediation. A CMC is co-located within the State Courts’ premises for that purpose. The Magistrate can also refer suitable cases for mediation at the CMC under Section 15 of the CMC Act. For such cases, mediation is compulsory.

== Partnerships ==
The CMCs collaborate with many partner agencies to encourage the awareness and use of community mediation in Singapore. It has referral arrangements with frontline public and community agencies, such as the Housing and Development Board (HDB), Singapore Police Force (SPF) and the People’s Association (PA). Through collaboration with its partners, the CMC aims to channel appropriate social and community disputes to CMC, as well as to increase awareness and use of community mediation.

== Youth Outreach ==
As part of the CMCs’ efforts to build a mediation culture in Singapore, it organises a variety of youth-oriented outreach programmes to generate awareness and understanding of mediation among youth. Currently, there are three main youth programmes organised by the CMC: the Peer Mediation Assembly programme, Youth Mediation Forum and Peer Mediation Training Workshops.

The Peer Mediation Assembly Programme consists of an interactive performance with themes related to conflict resolution and mediation; and introduces the mediation process.

The annual Youth Mediation Forum is a platform for student leaders to share their thoughts about how conflicts amongst youths should be resolved and learn more about mediation.

The Peer Mediation Training Workshop uses a variety of methods to equip student leaders with peer mediation skills. Through videos, lectures and role-play scenarios, students experience the mediation process first-hand to facilitate application in their daily lives.

== See also ==
- Mediation
- Alternative Dispute Resolution
- Ministry of Law (Singapore)
- Conflict Resolution
