= Adrian Tan =

Singaporean lawyer and author (1966–2023)

President of the Law Society of Singapore
- In office 1 January 2022 – 8 July 2023
- Preceded by: Gregory Vijayendran SC
- Succeeded by: Lisa Sam Hui Min

Personal details
- Born: 4 February 1966 Singapore
- Died: 8 July 2023 (aged 57) Singapore
- Education: National University of Singapore (LLB); The Open University (BSc)
- Occupation: Lawyer; author

Chinese name
- Traditional Chinese: 陳錦海
- Simplified Chinese: 陈锦海
- Hanyu Pinyin: Chén Jǐnhǎi

Adrian Tan Gim Hai (4 February 1966 – 8 July 2023) was a Singaporean lawyer and author. Known for writing the Teenage Textbook series of books in the 1980s, he was the 27th president of the Law Society of Singapore and a partner at TSMP Law Corporation. Of Hainanese descent, Tan was born in Singapore and studied law at the National University of Singapore (NUS). While studying at NUS, he wrote two novels in the 1980s – The Teenage Textbook and The Teenage Workbook – which would prove to be popular in Singapore.

He began his law career in 1991 at Drew and Napier, leaving to Stamford Law (now Morgan Lewis Stamford) in 2013 after 22 years of working at Drew and Napier. He later left to join TSMP Law Corporation in 2018, and was a member of many boards during this period. In 2022, he was appointed the president of the Law Society of Singapore, having previously been with them since 2013. In March that same year, he was diagnosed with cancer, and died of it in 2023.

== Early life and education ==
Tan was born in Singapore on 4 February 1966 to an ethnic Chinese family of Hainanese descent. His parents were both teachers, and he grew up in a Housing Development Board (HDB) flat.

As a child, Tan attended the Anglo-Chinese School and Hwa Chong Junior College. Tan was later conscripted into the army as a writer for Pioneer, the MINDEF magazine. After his A-levels, he was offered a teaching scholarship to study English at the University of East Anglia. He turned down the scholarship to study law at the National University of Singapore (NUS). While in university, Tan represented NUS as a debater in international competitions and televised debates in Singapore. He later completed a second, joint-honours degree in computer science and psychology from the Open University in 2004, while working as a lawyer.

== Career ==
While an undergraduate law student at NUS, Tan wrote the novels The Teenage Textbook (1988) and The Teenage Workbook (1989), which became bestsellers that sold over 50,000 copies. The Teenage Textbook was also made into a stage play by The Necessary Stage in 1997; a film in 1998, comprising both books, which topped the box office in Singapore for four weeks; a 2017 musical titled The Teenage Textbook Musical; and a 2021 TV series on Channel 5. In 2015, The Teenage Textbook was listed by The Business Times as one of the top 10 English Singapore books from 1965 to 2015. Tan also was a consultant for the Channel 5 television legal drama The Pupil. Tan was invited to a National Library Board festival but later boycotted it over the board's decision to withdraw children's books that depicted same-sex families from its libraries.

After graduating from NUS with a Bachelor of Laws degree, Tan began his legal career in 1991 at Drew and Napier, a large Singaporean firm. He initially practiced conveyancing law, but switched over to litigation thereafter, where he worked under Davinder Singh. In 1999, Tan left Drew for a two-year stint as general counsel of a technology firm, following which he returned to Drew. Eventually, after 22 years at Drew, Tan left to work for Stamford Law (now Morgan Lewis Stamford) in 2013. In 2018, Tan resigned from Stamford to work at TSMP Law Corporation. Tan practiced litigation, and specialised in intellectual property, information technology, real estate, and shareholder oppression disputes. He was also the honorary counsel of the Singapore Association of the Visually Handicapped, where he advocated for voting rights for the blind. He was also a member of the boards of the Law Society Pro Bono Services, Maxwell Chambers, and Arts House Limited, and was a member of the Speak Good English Movement committee.

From 2013 to 2021, Tan was a member of the Law Society Council, serving as treasurer in 2016 and vice president in 2017. In 2022, he was appointed president. As president of the law society, he was known for his public outreach on legal issues, such as the HDB's ban on cats, the 2022 bar exam cheating scandal, and Richard Branson's comments on the death penalty in Singapore. Tan gave his only Opening of the Legal Year speech as Law Society president in 2023, where he addressed attrition rates in the legal profession.

== Personal life and death ==
Tan married Angelina, who was an employee of the Ministry of Defence, they had no children. He was diagnosed with cancer in March 2022, and died on 8 July 2023, at age 57. At a memorial service celebrating his life, Tan was said to be someone who "had very little ego" and "cared for the less fortunate." Several lawyers attended the memorial service, including K. Shanmugam, Sundaresh Menon, and Hri Kumar Nair. After his death, a collection of essays by Tan on the issues he cared about and commented on, was published in a book entitled, If I were King of Singapore.

== Notable cases ==
- Wee Shuo Woon v HT S.R.L. [2017] SGCA 23
- Turf Club Auto Emporium Pte Ltd v Yeo Boong Hua [2018] SGCA 44
- Singsung Pte Ltd v LG 26 Electronics Pte Ltd (trading as L S Electrical Trading) [2016] SGCA 33
- Y.E.S. F&B Group Pte Ltd v Soup Restaurant Singapore Pte Ltd (formerly known as Soup Restaurant (Causeway Point) Pte Ltd) [2015] SGCA 55
- Acted as counsel in proceedings concerning Gilstead Court, Thomson View, and Shunfu Ville collective sales.

== Publications ==
- "Dear Adam, Help!" (1988, Hotspot Books), ISBN 981-3002-35-2
- The Teenage Textbook (1988, Hotspot Books), ISBN 981-3002-21-2
- The Teenage Workbook (1989, Hotspot Books), ISBN 981-3002-28-X
- "What Practice Has Taught Me" in The Practice Of Law (2011, LexisNexis), ISBN 978-981-4753-48-7
- If I were King of S'pore (2024, Landmark Books), ISBN 978-981-18-8805-2
- If I were Still King of S'pore (2025, Landmark Books), ISBN 978-981-94-2424-5
