= Adrianna Tan =

Director of product management for San Francisco

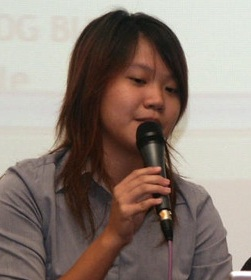
- Adrianna Tan at the blogging seminar Plugging Tomorrow in 2005.
- Education: Singapore Management University
- Occupation: Director of Digital Product Management
- Organization: Monterey Bay Aquarium
- Website: popagandhi.com

Adrianna Tan (born 1986) is a Singaporean product manager who has been the Director of Digital Product Management for the Monterey Bay Aquarium since November, 2024. Tan was previously Director of Product Management for the San Francisco Digital Services, as well as an entrepreneur and early employee at various technology companies.

== Education and career ==
Tan graduated from Singapore Management University with a Bachelor of Political Science.

She previously ran a design agency named Pen to Pixel as well as a gourmet ice cream business.

=== Wobe ===
In 2013, Tan founded Wobe, which is short for women's benefit, an app designed to help Indonesians set up their own businesses. The app was intended to promote financial inclusion in Indonesia by allowing users to easily purchase prepaid mobile phone credits without having to go through middlemen. Wobe hoped to be able to allow users to purchase other digital goods in the future as well. In July 2016, Wobe was crowned the inaugural winner of Her Startup, a female-focused trans-pacific startup competition. Wobe was funded by Draper Ventures, Wavemaker, Mercy Corps and other private investors.

Tan was named one of the Top Female Entrepreneurs of 2015 by True Global Ventures.

In 2016, Wobe was the winner of the Ascendas-Singbridge Her Startup 2016.

=== San Francisco ===
Tan joined the San Francisco Digital Service in 2019. In her role as Director of Product Management for the San Francisco Digital Service, Tan led various projects, including the sf.gov project, which aimed to consolidate the city's more than 200 websites in a single location and provide the content in English, Spanish, Chinese and Filipino. In June 2024, she left the San Francisco Digital Service.

In November, 2024, Tan wrote in a followers-only post on Mastodon of her new job at the Monterey Bay Aquarium, "I spoke to a few people about the hiring process for my job and they all said 'you were the first candidate who said tech can’t solve everything, this job is about people, and respectfully talked about being part of a team and not having all the answers'"

=== Impact ===
In 2012, she established the Gyanada Foundation, a non-profit based out of Singapore and India. The foundation provides young girls with bond-free scholarships to help them complete 12 years of formal education under a programme known as "Gynada Scholar". One of its other programmes is "Binary Story" which involves teaching of computer skills such as programming to under-privileged children. To date, about 2,800 children have benefitted from the foundation's programmes.

In 2013, Tan ran a Singapore-based, citizen-driven food project named Culture Kitchen. The project regularly hosted dinner parties in Singapore that aimed to highlight a specific non-citizen community each time. She aimed to gather about 100 migrant workers and 100 Singaporeans for every Kitchen Culture dinner, which happened once every three months.

In 2014, in response to an open letter written by Thio Su Mien to the then-Minister for Health, Gan Kim Yong, denouncing homosexuality, Tan published an open letter advocating for LGBT rights in Singapore.

As of 2024, Tan was the founder and managing director of a product management and artificial intelligence consultancy named FutureEthics.

== Political activity ==
Tan served as the digital engagement team leader for the National Solidarity Party in the 2011 Singaporean general election.

== Personal life ==
Whilst studying for her undergraduate degree, Tan spent many summer breaks in various Indian cities, volunteering at non-government organisations (NGOs), writing for Indian newspapers, and meeting people from all walks of life.

Tan is gay. She relocated from Singapore to San Francisco in 2018, where she now lives with her wife.

In 2018, after the film Crazy Rich Asians was released, Tan posted a thread commenting on 'crazy rich' Asians in Singapore which became very popular. In the thread, she observed that "My friends at school ate $30 lunches daily at nice restaurants, age 13; vacationed in private islands with royalty, age 15. I was an outsider in this world".

In 2022, Tan stated that she would be deactivating her Twitter account in favour of her Mastodon account, and explained that "[w]alled gardens were a mistake".
