= Tan Yock Lin =

Singaporean law professor (1953 – 2023)

Tan Yock Lin PBM PBS
- Born: 1952 or 1953
- Died: 5 July 2023 (aged 70)
- Education: Imperial College London (BSc); University of Oxford (BA, BCL, Dip Econ Devt)
- Employer: National University of Singapore Faculty of Law
- Notable work: Criminal Procedure (2002)

Chinese name
- Traditional Chinese: 陳毓麟
- Simplified Chinese: 陈毓麟
Transcriptions
Standard Mandarin
- Hanyu Pinyin: Chén Yùlín
Southern Min
- Hokkien POJ: Tân Io̍k-lîn

Tan Yock Lin PBM PBS (Chinese: 陳毓麟; 1952 or 1953 – 5 July 2023) was a Singaporean law professor at the National University of Singapore (NUS). He was known for his numerous texts on conflict-of-law, criminal procedure, and the legal profession.

== Education and career ==
Tan read engineering at Imperial College and law at the University of Oxford. After working at the Economic Development Board and the Monetary Authority of Singapore, he joined the faculty of NUS in 1982 and subsequently became a law professor in 2000.

In August 2008, Tan was awarded the Public Service Medal (PBM) during the National Day Awards for his work in law reform with the Singapore Academy of Law. When asked to say a few words about the award, he said, "Law reform is tremendously exciting and I am truly thankful to have been given the opportunity to work with and learn from some of the country's most informed and forward legal minds." By 2021, he was the longest-serving member of Singapore Academy of Law's Law Reform Committee.

In 2010, Tan was appointed the inaugural Geoffrey Bartholomew Professor. On his appointment, NUS Law Dean Tan Cheng Han noted, "It is befitting that the inaugural appointee is Professor Tan Yock Lin. Besides sharing a deep practice in the law, both Professor Tan and Professor Bartholomew started out as economists. Though their paths may not quite have crossed, each has left indelible footprints for the rest of us to follow. Just as Professor Bartholomew had touched many lives in his time at the University, Prof Tan continues to share his wealth of experience and knowledge with many of our law students." Tan held this professorship till 2014 when he was succeeded by Jeffrey Pinsler. He received the Long Service Medal in 2013. In 2021, he was appointed emeritus professor at NUS.

== Death ==
Tan was killed in a traffic crash on Upper Thomson Road in Singapore on 5 July 2023. He was 70. A 26-year-old lorry driver was arrested for careless driving causing death. A video of the incident showed a lorry running over a road divider and crashing into a car that was travelling in the opposite direction. In a memoriam, a colleague noted that "Generations of lawyers, judges, and academics in Singapore have seen further because Yock Lin lifted us up upon his shoulders."

== Works ==
- Tan, Yock Lin (1991). Law of Advocates and Solicitors in Singapore and West Malaysia. Singapore & Austin, TX: Malayan Law Journal & Butterworth Legal Publishers. ISBN 978-0-409-99593-0. OCLC 25084100.
- ——— (1993). Conflicts Issues in Family and Succession Law. Singapore & Austin, TX: Butterworths. ISBN 978-0-409-99641-8. OCLC 30076502.
- ——— (1996). Criminal Procedure (in 2 vols.). Singapore: Butterworth & Co. (Asia). ISBN 978-0-409-99794-1. OCLC 957034726.
- ———; Xavier, Francis (2006). The Conflict of Laws in Singapore, 2001-2005. Singapore: Singapore Academy of Law. ISBN 981-05-7232-8. OCLC 775676890.
- ———; Mohan, S. Chandra (2012). Criminal procedure in Singapore and Malaysia. Singapore: LexisNexis. ISBN 978-981-236-920-8. OCLC 793210302. - updating resource
- ——— (2014). Personal Property Law. Law practice series. Singapore: Academy Publishing. ISBN 978-981-07-6801-0. OCLC 880663205.

Academic offices
Preceded by New Office	Geoffrey Bartholomew Professor at National University of Singapore Faculty of Law; 2010–2014	Succeeded by Jeffrey Pinsler
