= Landmark Books (publisher) =

Book publisher in Singapore

Founded in 1986, Landmark Books Pte. Ltd. is an independent publisher based in Singapore. The company publishes a wide range of genres, spanning art books, cookbooks, heritage, prose, poetry as well as business / investment guides. They also provide publishing and consultancy services.

== History ==
Landmark Books was founded in 1986 by Goh Eck Kheng He graduated with a law degree from the National University of Singapore. Goh began working at an editorial job in Eastern Universities Press, a subsidiary of United Publishers Services. When both were sold to Times Publishing, he eventually decided to strike out on his own with the creation of Landmark Books.

Subsequently, they published their first book, titled "We Remember: Cameos of Pioneer Life" by Yvonne Quahe, which chronicled the oral history of Singaporean pioneers from 1920 to 1930. In 1991, Landmark Books also became the first Singaporean publishing firm to print its publications on recycled paper.

== Notable publications ==
Notable works published under Landmark Books include Adrian Tan's bestselling novels, The Teenage Textbook and The Teenage Workbook. The Teenage Textbook was subsequently adapted into a film. Other notable works include Simon Tay's book, City of Small Blessings, which won the Singapore Literature Prize in 2010. Most recently, the memoirs of Malaysian tycoon Robert Kuok sold over 40,000 copies, more than usual for a Singapore release.
