= The Teenage Workbook =

1989 humour fiction novel by Adrian Tan

- Author: Adrian Tan
- Language: English
- Genre: Young adult fiction
- Set in: Singapore
- Publisher: Hotspot Books, Landmark Books
- Publication date: 1989
- Publication place: Singapore
- Pages: 253
- ISBN: 9789813002289 1989
- Preceded by: The Teenage Textbook

The Teenage Workbook is a young adult fiction novel by Adrian Tan, first published by Hotspot Books in 1989.

== Development ==
Tan wrote the book while he was an undergraduate law student at the National University of Singapore.

== Background ==
The book is the sequel to The Teenage Textbook (published in 1988). Both novels focused on the lives of four students studying at the fictitious Paya Lebar Junior College in Singapore.

Following the death of Adrian Tan in July 2023, the Memorial Edition of the two books were published by Landmark Books on the following month.

== Adaptations ==
In 1998, the book and its prequel were made into a film, The Teenage Textbook Movie, starring Melody Chen and Caleb Goh, which topped the box office in Singapore for four weeks.
