= Peter Low =

Singaporean lawyer

Peter Cuthbert Low is a Singaporean lawyer who was the 16th President of the Law Society of Singapore from 1993 to 1994. Low is known for his human rights advocacy and litigation in Singapore.

== Life and career ==
Low was a public and military prosecutor from 1977 to 1981, qualifying at the Singapore bar in 1980. In 1991, he joined the local law firm Drew and Napier.

In 2023, he was awarded the CC Tan award by the Law Society.

== Personal life ==
Low is a Catholic. He is married with three daughters, Christine and Elaine.

== Notable cases ==
- Wong Souk Yee v Attorney-General [2019] 1 SLR 1223
- Attorney-General v Aljunied-Hougang-Punggol East Town Council [2016] 1 SLR 915
- Tey Tsun Hang v Public Prosecutor [2014] SGHC 39
- Lim Meng Suang and another v Attorney-General [2013] 3 SLR 118
- BNJ v SMRT Trains Ltd [2013] SGHC 286
- Review Publishing Co Ltd v Lee Hsien Loong [2010] 1 SLR 52
- Tang Liang Hong v Lee Kuan Yew [1997] 3 SLR 576
- Chng Suan Tze v Minister for Home Affairs [1988] 2 SLR 525

== See also ==
- Lawyers in Singapore
