= IPTO =

IPTO may refer to:

- Independent Power Transmission Operator, or ADMIE in Greek
- Information Processing Techniques Office
- Insolvency and Public Trustee's Office
- Independent Power Takeoff
- Indo-Pacific Treaty Organization, proposed
