= Cavinder Bull =

Singaporean lawyer

Cavinder Bull SC
- Born: Singapore
- Education: University of Oxford (BA); Harvard University (LLM)
- Occupation: Lawyer
- Years active: 1993–present
- Known for: CEO of Drew & Napier

Cavinder Bull SC is a Singaporean lawyer and the chief executive officer of the law firm Drew & Napier. He has served in this position since August 2017, upon the departure of Davinder Singh to start his own practice. He has an active practice in complex litigation and international arbitration and is considered one of the top 15 litigators in South-East Asia. In late 2024, Bull was awarded a global award for commercial litigation lawyer of the year. In 2025, Bull was named the dedicatee of the Delos Remote Oral Advocacy Programme Asia 2025.

== Career ==
=== Legal career ===
Bull graduated with a Bachelor of Arts (first class honours) in Jurisprudence from Trinity College, Oxford University in 1992, and was called to the Bar of England and Wales the next year. He was ranked fourth in the Bar Exams; when he returned to Singapore, he topped the local Bar Exam. He served as a Justices' Law Clerk to former Chief Justice Yong Pung How before joining Drew & Napier in 1994, and left for Harvard Law School in 1995 on a Lee Kuan Yew Scholarship to pursue a Master of Laws. He then passed the New York Bar Exams and joined Sullivan & Cromwell as a litigation associate.

Bull re-joined Drew & Napier in late 1997 and was made a partner in 1998. He is involved in commercial litigation and international arbitration and is cited by Chambers Global and Asia Pacific Legal 500 as one of Singapore's top lawyers. In 2008, he was appointed Senior Counsel at the age of 39, an accolade rarely accorded to those under 40 years of age. Bull is also occasionally involved in academic writings, having written on subjects such as civil procedure. He has sat on various review committees, such as one chaired by the Attorney-General in 2006 regarding the supply of foreign lawyers in Singapore, and was reported to be looking into developing a mechanism "to handle disputes amongst businesses" in Singapore and China.

Bull sits on several professional bodies, including Vice-President of the SIAC Court of Arbitration, a member of the Advisory Board of the International Council for Commercial Arbitration, and on the Advisory Board of the AFSA International Arbitration Rules Drafting Committee. Bull was also appointed to the Disciplinary Tribunal of the International Association of Athletics Federations and also a member of the NUS Law Advisory Council. He was previously also the Co-Chairman of the Singapore Exchange Disciplinary Committee, where he served for six years.

Bull has been involved in several high profile and high value matters in the course of his career including a US$1.27 billion case involving Georgia's former prime minister Bidzina Ivanishvili, a civil case acting for the liquidators against Hin Leong founder Lim Oon Kuin, securing a S$3.5 billion judgment in that case, and a case of fraud by thumb drive inventor Henn Tan. He also acted for Sharp Corporation in an international arbitration relating to a US$3 billion contractual relationship concerning the sale of Sharp televisions in various territories, and for an international sports marketing and media rights management group in three arbitrations arising from broadcasting and media rights to the Indian Premier League, involving agreements worth over US$1.2 billion. Bull also represented Ong Beng Seng in a high profile case involving former Minister S Iswaran. Bull was also on the Disciplinary Tribunal which fined Eugene Thuraisingam for a poem that was in contempt of court in 2018. He also represented Lee Kuan Yew's former lawyer Kwa Kim Li in disciplinary proceedings as a result of a complaint made by Lee Hsien Yang.

He has also sat as an arbitrator in investor-state arbitrations under the auspices of International Centre for Settlement of Investment Disputes, North American Free Trade Agreement and the Permanent Court of Arbitration; including City-State NV, Praktyka Asset Management Company LLC, Crystal-Invest LLC and Prodiz LLC v Ukraine, Tennant Energy v Canada, and Rizzani de Eccher SpA and others v State of Kuwait.

=== Other appointments ===
==== Directorships ====
- Singapore Technologies Electronics (2009–2012)
- National Healthcare Group (2009–2012)
- Singapore University of Technology and Design (2009–2015)
- Ascendas Property Fund Trustee (2010–2013)
- Agri‑Food and Veterinary Authority of Singapore (2004–2010)

== Personal life ==
Bull and his two elder sisters were raised single-handedly by his mother after his father died when he was 15 months old. He studied at Anglo-Chinese School (Independent) and Anglo-Chinese Junior College.
