= Thio Li-ann =

Singaporean law professor

- 张黎衍
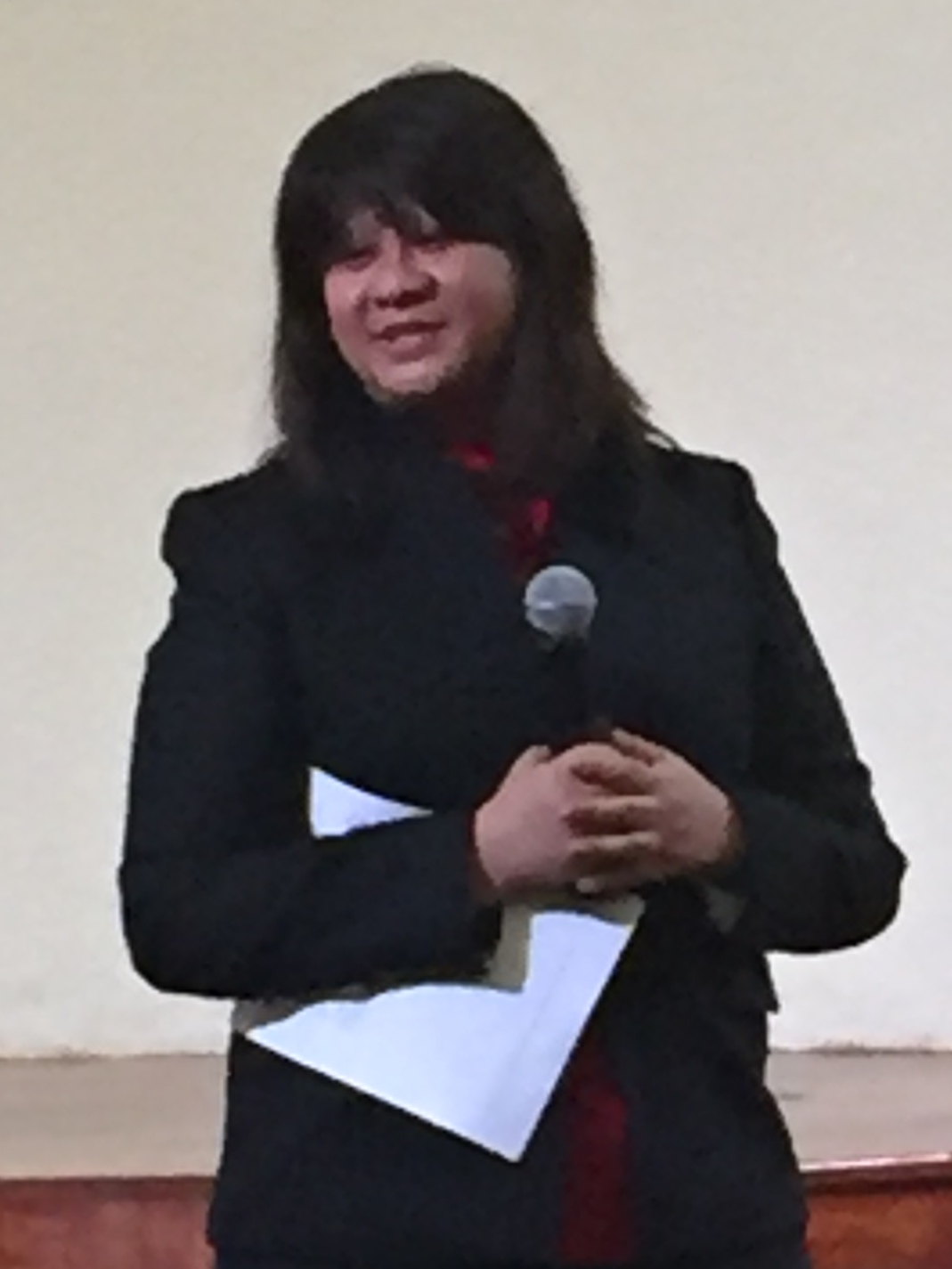
- Thio speaking at The Arts House in 2015

Nominated Member of Parliament
- In office 18 January 2007 – 17 July 2009
- Appointed by: S R Nathan

Personal details
- Born: 10 March 1968 (age 58) Singapore
- Relations: Thio Su Mien (mother); Josie Lau Meng Lee (cousin-in-law)
- Education: Keble College, Oxford (BA); Harvard University (LLM); University of Cambridge (PhD)
- Occupation: Professor of law

Thio Li-ann
- Simplified Chinese: 张黎衍
Transcriptions
Standard Mandarin
- Hanyu Pinyin: Zhāng Lí Yǎn

Thio Li-ann (born 10 March 1968) is a Singaporean law professor at the National University of Singapore and a former Nominated Member of Parliament (2007–2009). She has attracted international attention and criticism for public remarks opposing the repeal of Singapore's former law criminalising sex between men (Section 377A), which many have likened to hate speech. In 2009, after protests by some students and alumni over her statements, she withdrew from a planned visiting professorship at New York University School of Law.

== Early life and education ==
Thio Li-ann was born in Singapore on 10 March 1968. Her mother is Dr. Thio (née Huang) Su Mien, former dean of the Faculty of Law of the National University of Singapore (NUS) and presently founder of TSMP Law Corporation; her brother, Thio Shen Yi, is joint managing director of the same law firm.

Thio was educated at the Singapore Chinese Girls' School (1975–1984) and Hwa Chong Junior College (1984–1986), at the latter on a Humanities Award from the Ministry of Education. She took a Bachelor of Arts (B.A. (Hons.)) in jurisprudence at Keble College, Oxford between 1987 and 1990. At Oxford, she was awarded the Law Moderations Book Prize (Constitutional Law, Criminal Law and Roman Law) in 1988. She was called to the bar as a barrister at Gray's Inn in 1991.

== Academic career ==
Thio joined the Faculty of Law of the NUS as a senior tutor in 1991 and was appointed Lecturer in 1992. That same year, she embarked on postgraduate law studies at Harvard Law School on a National University of Singapore Overseas Graduate Scholarship and obtained a Master of Laws (LL.M.) in 1993. She returned to NUS, where in 1997 she was appointed an assistant professor. Between 1997 and 2000, she carried out PhD research at the University of Cambridge on another NUS Overseas Graduate Scholarship and was duly conferred this degree in 2000. Her PhD dissertation, entitled Managing Babel: The International Legal Protection of Minorities in the Twentieth Century, was subsequently published by Martinus Nijhoff Publishers in 2005. In June 2000, she was appointed an associate professor and achieved the rank of full Professor in July 2006. Her research interests are the following:

- Constitutionalism and human rights in Asia.
- Domestic and comparative perspectives of constitutional law and administrative law.
- International human rights law and the rights of peoples.
- Law and religion.
- Public international law, its history and theory.

Thio was Young Asian Scholar at the Melbourne University Law School in 1997, was ranked as an NUS Excellent Teacher in 2001–2002 and 2002–2003, and was given a Young Researcher Award by NUS in 2004. In March 2006, she was a visiting lecturer at the Faculty of Law of the University of Hong Kong, where she was one of the academics teaching a course on "National Protection of Human Rights". In September of that year, she returned to the University of Melbourne as a senior fellow of its graduate law programme to teach a course entitled "Constitutionalism in Asian Societies".

Thio served as chief editor of the Singapore Journal of International & Comparative Law between 2000 and 2003, and since 2005 has been General Editor of the Asian Yearbook of International Law. She is also on the editorial or advisory boards of the Singapore Yearbook of International Law, the New Zealand Yearbook of International Law (since 2003), the University of Bologna Law Review (since 2016), and Human Rights & International Legal Discourse (since 2006), and is corresponding editor (Singapore) for Blaustein & Flanz's Constitutions of the Countries of the World (since 2001) and the International Journal of Constitutional Law (since 2001). Since 2001, she has also been a contributor on constitutional and administrative law to the Singapore Academy of Law Annual Review of Singapore Cases.

Thio was also a consultant to a delegation of the House of Representatives of Japan (30 September 2002) and to the University of Warwick on academic freedom issues (2005).

=== NYU Law School controversy ===
In 2009, Thio was scheduled to join New York University School of Law as a visiting professor and to teach courses including "Human Rights Law in Asia" and a seminar on constitutionalism. Her appointment prompted objections from some students and alumni after attention was drawn to her prior public statements opposing the repeal of Singapore's law criminalising sex between men, and to other public comments about homosexuality. According to The Chronicle of Higher Education, an online petition opposing the appointment attracted more than 740 signatures. Many noted the irony in her appointment, and prompted calls for condemnation of her "anti-gay hate speech" before Parliament. The university's gay and lesbian law student group, NYU OUTLaw, released a statement calling for the condemnation.

NYU Law School's Dean Richard Revesz issued a memorandum stating "the Law School categorically rejects the point of view expressed in Professor Thio's speech, as evidenced by our early and longstanding commitment to end discrimination on the basis of sexual orientation." Students at NYU Law School have issued statements as well.

Thio then sent an 18-point defence memo to the entire NYU Law faculty. On 22 July 2009, she informed the school of her withdrawal from the appointment, citing hostility by its community towards her views and low enrolment; it was reported that only 9 students applied for her course on human rights and 5 for her other course on constitutionalism.

== Political career ==
From 18 January 2007, Thio was appointed a Nominated Member of Parliament of the 11th Session of the Parliament of Singapore for a two-and-a-half-year term.

In October 2007, during parliamentary debate on amendments to the Penal Code, Thio spoke in support of retaining Section 377A, which at the time criminalised sex between men. According to contemporary reporting, she described anal sex as "like shoving a straw up your nose to drink" and argued that homosexuality was "contrary to biological design and immoral". She claimed to have support from a majority of Singaporeans, and stated she spoke "at the risk of being burned at the stake by militant activists." At the same time, Thio mentioned the existence of an active "gay agenda" that seeks to lobby the government and radically change sexual norms.

The Internet subsequently saw a flood of websites heavily rebutting Thio's speech, most of which focused on her lurid straw-up-the-nose analogy. Local journalist Janadas Devan, in a feature article in The Straits Times on 27 October, titled "377A debate and the rewriting of pluralism", the pointed out that the speech was heavily laced with phrases and imagery from the Dominionist movement. Another Straits Times writer, Chua Mui Hoong, also wrote an article titled "Rules of Engagement for God and Politics" on 16 November 2007. In it, Chua acknowledged Thio's position in her speech that secularism could challenge religion. However, Chua disagreed that religion has been antagonised in Singapore, and encouraged that specific explanation be given as to how the repeal of a law would in reality harm the Singaporean society.

Thio's speech also drew the criticism of Michael Kirby, then a judge of the High Court of Australia, who referenced it in a speech he delivered in Brisbane on 16 November 2007. The content of his speech was subsequently published in The Sydney Morning Herald on 19 November 2007.

During the debate, Thio revealed that playwright Alfian Sa'at had sent her a short email saying, among other things, that "I hope I outlive you long enough to see the repeal of 377A and on that day I will piss on your grave." Sa'at later took responsibility for the email, saying it was sent in a moment of folly in response to the rumour that Thio had called the police to complain about a "Pink Picnic" some members of the gay community were organising in the Botanic Gardens. Thio later denied the allegation, and Sa'at apologised. Subsequently, in November 2007, Thio was alerted by the media to an anonymous threatening letter addressed to her stating: "We know where you work, we'll send people there to hunt you down". Thio made a police report the same day.

Thio has also expressed opposition to Singapore's abortion laws. In a 2023 interview, she said Singapore had "very liberal abortion laws" and that she "strongly disagree[d]" with them, arguing that liberal access to abortion "cheapen[s] life" and that discussions of human rights should include a "right to be born". In the same interview, she described marriage as "a social good" and discussed demographic concerns and family formation.

=== AWARE Takeover by Thio Su Mien ===
In 2009, a group of conservative Christian women from the Church of Our Savior, under the leadership of Josie Lau and orchestrated by Thio's mother, Thio Su Mien, took over the executive council of the group AWARE, a non-governmental organisation in Singapore concerned with promoting gender equality.

Contemporary accounts reported that the incoming group, led by Lau and Mien, objected to what it described as AWARE advancing a “pro-gay agenda”, including concerns about AWARE's involvement in sexuality education. The previous leadership subsequently convened an extraordinary general meeting on 2 May 2009; after several hours of debate, members passed a motion of no confidence and voted to remove the incoming executive committee.

On 26 May 2009, during Thio's first speech in parliament since the event, Thio accused the local press of biased reporting on the events surrounding the attempted takeover. In response, The Straits Times editor Han Fook Kwang published an editorial defending the paper's reporting and describing how the story had been covered. Kwang expressed his sadness at the vindictiveness of "critics [Thio] and the length to which they are prepared to go to attack our professionalism" and integrity, detailing the sequence of events and how their journalists had investigated and reported on the proceedings. Government leaders later cited the episode in broader remarks about religion and politics, warning against religiously motivated attempts to enter civil society spaces to take over organisations and impose agendas.

=== Question regarding support from the majority ===
Thio's strong position towards retaining the code drew much protest from some Singaporeans. Two issues were constantly raised. The first issue was the question of the real existence of a majority against repeal of the code. The second issue was the question of whether a stance against homosexual behaviour would equate to wanting a code to criminalise the act of sodomy. Concerns were also raised by a law professor on whether it was realistically possible to enforce such a code, whether it would lead to dangers of entrapment, and whether the informal position of the government not to enforce the code would reverse overnight. Section 377A was repealed in 2022 as part of amendments to the Penal Code.

== Personal life ==
Thio was born to Thio Gim Hock, who was the chairman of OUE Limited, and Thio Su Mien, the former dean of NUS law school and founder of the TSMP Law Corporation. Her maternal grandfather is Reverend Huang Yang Ying, first principal of Anglican High School. Her brother, Thio Shen Yi, a senior counsel, who manages TSMP with his wife, Stefanie Yuen-Thio.

=== Religious affiliation ===
Thio is a Christian. In an interview with the local daily The Straits Times on 2 November 2007, Thio shared her personal story of how she converted from a "very, very arrogant" atheist to a Christian in 1987. Having entered Oxford University to read jurisprudence, she attended a Christian Union talk then and claimed to be "stopped" by a voice.

"I basically had a sense that God was talking to me. I had stood up to walk out and I heard someone say, 'Stop'. And no one was around me. Everybody was busy doing their own thing. I was one of only one or two Chinese girls in this whole room of ang mohs. And then I just had the sense that I had encountered God, that he knew my name and I was shocked." Thio was quoted as saying in the interview.

She added, "I don't know what right wing is. This is funny because I was always considered a political leftie and now I'm a rightie."

== Selected works ==
=== Representative articles ===
- Thio, Li-ann (1997), "An 'i' for an 'I': Singapore's Communitarian Model of Constitutional Adjudication", Hong Kong Law Journal, 27: 152–186, ISSN 0378-0600.
- Thio, Li-ann (1999), "Implementing Human Rights in ASEAN Countries: Promises to Keep and Miles to Go before I Sleep", Yale Human Rights & Development Law Journal, 2: 1–86, ISSN 1548-2596.
- Thio, Li-ann (2002), "Battling Balkanization: Regional Approaches towards Minority Protection beyond Europe", Harvard International Law Journal, 43 (2): 409–468, ISSN 0017-8063.
- Thio, Li-ann (2002), "Recent Constitutional Developments: Of Shadows and Whips, Race, Rifts and Rights, Terror and Tudungs, Women and Wrongs", Singapore Journal of Legal Studies: 328–373, ISSN 0218-2173.
- Thio, Li-ann (2004), "Pragmatism and Realism Do Not Mean Abdication: A Critical Inquiry into Singapore's Engagement with International Human Rights Law", Singapore Year Book of International Law, 8: 41–91, ISSN 1793-0448.
- Thio, Li-ann (2006), "'Beyond the Four Walls' in an Age of Transnational Judicial Conversations: Civil Liberties, Rights Theories and Constitutional Adjudication in Malaysia and Singapore", Columbia Journal of Asian Law, 19 (2): 428–518, ISSN 1094-8449.

=== Contributions towards books ===
- Thio, Li-ann (1997), "The Elected President and the Legal Control of Government: Quis Custodiet Ipsos Custodes?", in Tan, Kevin; Lam, Peng Er (eds.), Managing Political Change in Singapore: The Elected Presidency, New York, N.Y.: Routledge, p. 100, ISBN 0-415-15632-7.
- Thio, Li-ann (1997), "Choosing Representatives: Singapore Does It Her Way", in Hassall, Graham; Saunders, Cheryl (eds.), The People's Representatives: Electoral Systems in the Asia-Pacific Region, St. Leonards, N.S.W.: Allen & Unwin, pp. 38–58, ISBN 1-86448-258-3.
- Thio, Li-ann (1999), "The Constitutional Framework of Powers", in Tan, Kevin Y.L. (Yew Lee) (ed.), The Singapore Legal System (2nd ed.), Singapore: Singapore University Press, p. 67, ISBN 9971-69-213-9.
- Thio, Li-ann (1999), "Law and the Administrative State", in Tan, Kevin Y.L. (Yew Lee) (ed.), The Singapore Legal System (2nd ed.), Singapore: Singapore University Press, p. 160, ISBN 9971-69-213-9.
- Thio, Li-ann (2004), "Rule of Law within a Non-liberal "Communitarian" Democracy : The Singapore Experience", in Peerenboom, Randall (ed.), Asian Discourses of Rule of Law: Theories and Implementation of Rule of Law in Twelve Asian Countries, France and the U.S., London; New York, N.Y.: RoutledgeCurzon, pp. 183–224, ISBN 0-415-32612-5.
- Thio, Li-ann (2005), "Taking Rights Seriously?: Human Rights Law in Singapore", in Peerenboom, R. (Randall) P.; Petersen, Carole; Chen, Albert H.Y. (eds.), Human Rights in Asia: A Comparative Legal Study of Twelve Asian Countries, France and the United States, New York, N.Y.: Routledge, p. 158, ISBN 0-415-36003-X.
- Thio, Li-ann (2006), "International Law and Secession in the Asia-Pacific Region", in Kohen, Marcelo G. (ed.), Secession: International Law Perspectives, Cambridge: Cambridge University Press, pp. 297–354, ISBN 0-521-84928-4.

=== Books ===
- Tan, Kevin Y[ew] L[ee]; Thio, Li-ann (2010), Constitutional Law in Malaysia and Singapore (3rd ed.), Singapore: LexisNexis, ISBN 978-981-236-795-2.
- Thio, Li-ann (2005), Managing Babel: The International Legal Protection of Minorities in the Twentieth Century [International Studies in Human Rights; v. 81], Leiden; Boston, Mass.: Martinus Nijhoff Publishers, ISBN 978-90-04-14198-8.
- Thio, Li-ann (2009), Mind the Gap: Contending for Righteousness in an Age of Lawlessness, Singapore: Genesis Books, ISBN 978-981-4222-59-4.
- Thio, Li-ann; Tan, Kevin Y[ew] L[ee], eds. (2009), Evolution of a Revolution: Forty Years of the Singapore Constitution, London; New York, N.Y.: Routledge-Cavendish, ISBN 978-0-415-43862-9.
- Thio, Li-ann (2013), Prophecy, Pansexuality and Pandemonium: The Political Arm of the Spirit of Lawlessness in the Acharit-hayamim, Singapore: Genesis Books, ISBN 978-981-446165-8.
