= The Teenage Textbook =

1988 novel by Adrian Tan

- Author: Adrian Tan
- Language: English
- Genre: Young adult fiction
- Set in: Singapore
- Publisher: Hotspot Books, Landmark Books
- Publication date: 1988
- Publication place: Singapore
- Pages: 175
- ISBN: 9789813002210 1988
- Followed by: The Teenage Workbook

The Teenage Textbook is a young adult fiction novel by the Singaporean author Adrian Tan, first published by Hotspot Books in 1988.

== Background ==
The book followed the life of a female student named Mui Ee, studying at the fictitious Paya Lebar Junior College in Singapore.

== Development ==
Tan wrote the book while he was an undergraduate law student at the National University of Singapore.

== Reception ==
The book was a bestseller in Singapore, and was followed by a sequel, The Teenage Workbook, in 1989. The two books sold over 50,000 copies.

In 2015, The Teenage Textbook was selected by The Business Times as one of the Top 10 English Singapore books from 1965 to 2015, alongside titles by Arthur Yap and Daren Shiau.

Following the death of Tan in July 2023, the Memorial Edition of the two books were published by Landmark Books on the following month.

== Adaptations ==
In 1997, The Teenage Textbook was made into a stage play by The Necessary Stage, starring Hossan Leong and Mark Richmond. In 1998, the book and its sequel were made into a film, The Teenage Textbook Movie, starring Melody Chen and Caleb Goh, which topped the box office in Singapore for four weeks.

In 2021, the book was reimagined by Drew Pan as a TV series titled Teenage Textbook – The Series, on Channel 5, starring Xuan Ong, Chen Yixin, and Chris Mak.
