= Chong Chee Kin =

Singaporean journalist

Chong Chee Kin (c.1973 – 1 November 2012) was a Singaporean journalist who worked for The Straits Times.

== Career ==
Chong graduated from the National University of Singapore with a degree in English literature and theatre studies. After graduation, he starred in the film The Teenage Textbook Movie. He then began working as a journalist with Singapore Press Holdings. He continued with the company for 14 years, holding various positions, starting in 1998 as a crime reporter for The Straits Times. In 2000, he won the Straits Times Young Journalist of the Year award and the paper's Story of the Year award for exposing that SingNet, a Singaporean Internet service provider, was scanning customers' computers. In an article published in April 1999, he had described how the computers of over 2 million customers of SingNet were being scanned to assess vulnerability of their systems to hacking, without the knowledge of the customers concerned.

Chong was later the assistant news editor for the paper and the news editor for the free bilingual paper My Paper. His final role with The Straits Times was working to increase the online presence of the paper. In October 2012, he joined the staff of the newspaper TODAY, and was scheduled to take up the post of News Editor the following month.

== Death ==
Chong, who suffered from diabetes, died of heart failure aged 39 on 1 November 2012 in his flat in Singapore. His body was discovered by family members in the evening of that day.
