= Tey Tsun Hang =

Malaysian former lawyer

Tey Tsun Hang (born 1970–1972; Chinese: 郑尊行; pinyin: Zhèng Zūn Xíng) is a Malaysian former lawyer, legal academic, and judge of the Subordinate Courts of Singapore.

== Education ==
Tey received an LLB from King's College London and a BCL from St Hugh's College, the University of Oxford.

== Career ==
Tey was appointed assistant professor of law at the National University of Singapore (NUS) in 1997, before undertaking a clerkship at the Supreme Court of Singapore in 2000. He later became a prosecutor and district judge, before returning to NUS as an associate professor.

On 28 May 2013, Tey was convicted of corruption for allegedly procuring gifts and intimate relations from a student for better grades, following which he was also fired from NUS. At trial, Tey defended himself, though he later opted to appeal the decision while serving the five-month jail term, through a new lawyer, Peter Low. and was subsequently acquitted. The appeal was only decided after he had completed his sentence; in the High Court's decision, Justice Woo Bih Li found that, although Tey had indeed abused his position to engage in sexual relations with a student, he was not guilty of corruption as the relationship was not entered into for grades.

After his release, Tey claimed that his prosecution was politically motivated, which a 2014 article in the Australian Journal of Asian Law supported. Through his lawyer at the time, M Ravi, Tey also filed for judicial review of his dismissal from NUS, arguing that his tenure protected him from dismissal. In October 2013, Tey left Singapore without a valid re-entry permit, subsequently losing his Singaporean permanent residency status. Tey later filed another judicial review lawsuit against the Immigrations and Checkpoints Authority of Singapore, but the suit was dismissed on the grounds that Tey had not first exhausted all available alternatives, a procedural requirement for judicial review to be considered.

== Selected bibliography ==
- Tey, Tsun Hang (2010), "Death Penalty Singapore-Style: Clinical and Carefree", Common Law World Review, 39 (4): 315–357, doi:10.1350/clwr.2010.39.4.0208, S2CID 147148491
- Tey, Tsun Hang (December 2008). "Singapore's Electoral System: Government by the People?". Legal Studies. 28 (4): 610–628. doi:10.1111/j.1748-121X.2008.00106.x. S2CID 143965283.
- Tey, Tsun Hang (November 2008), "Confining the Freedom of the Press in Singapore – A 'Pragmatic' Press for 'Nation Building'?", Human Rights Quarterly, 30 (4): 876–905, doi:10.1353/hrq.0.0034, S2CID 144347041
- Tey Tsun Hang (2008), "Singapore's Jurisprudence of Political Defamation and its Triple-Whammy Impact on Political Speech", Public Law: 452
- Tey Tsun Hang (2008), "Excluding Religion from Politics and Enforcing Religious Harmony – Singapore-Style", Singapore Journal of Legal Studies: 118–142 at 129.
