= Church of Our Saviour, Singapore =

Church in Queenstown, Singapore

Coordinates: 1.2988°N 103.8009°E

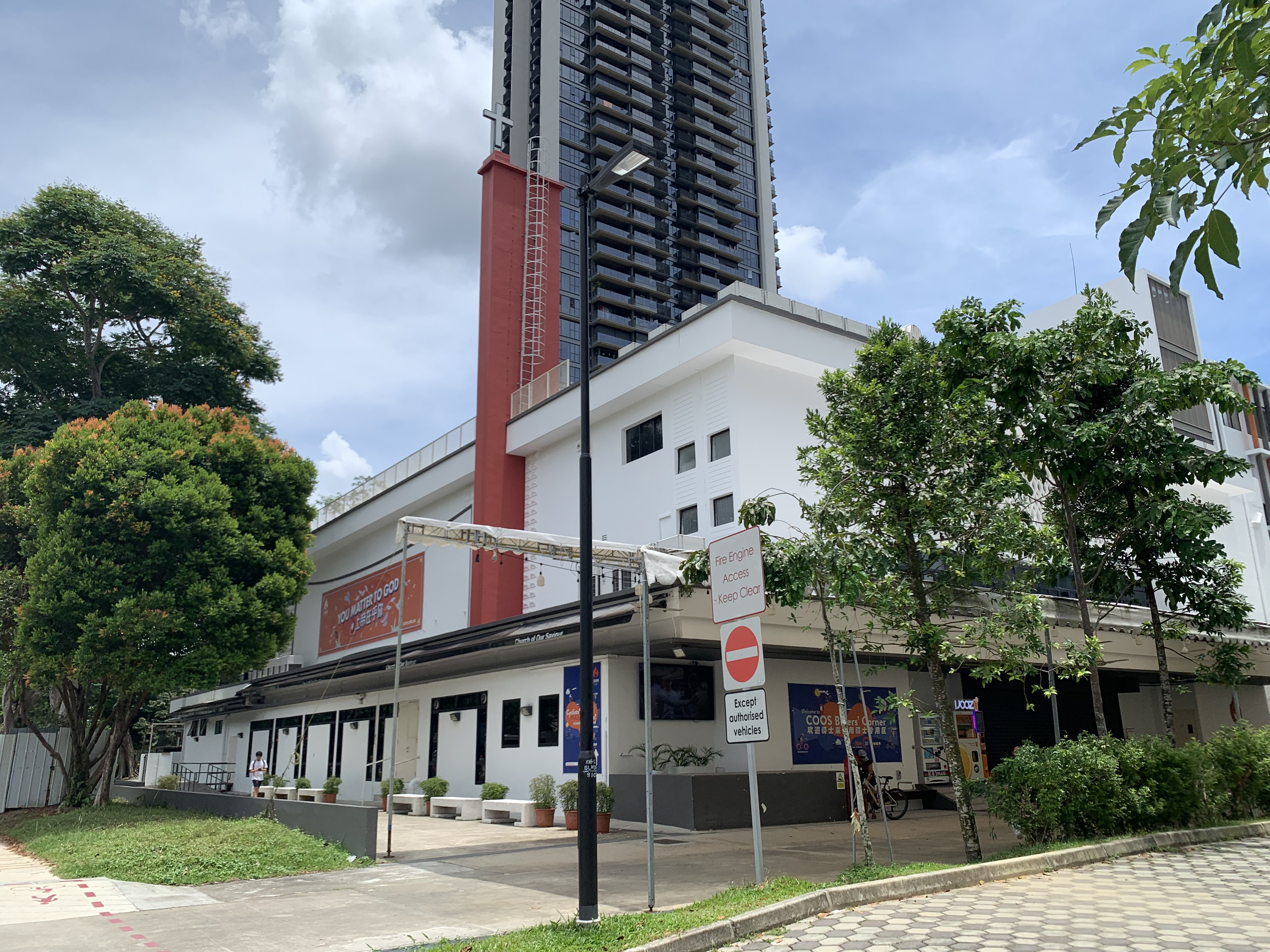
Church of Our Saviour, housed in the former Venus Theatre building, 2025

The Church of Our Saviour (COOS) is a church in Queenstown, Singapore, which began as a mission in the 1950s along Alexandra Road and has since grown into a megachurch with a weekly attendance of approximately 4,500. While it is a parish within the mainline Anglican Diocese of Singapore, COOS is known for its contemporary worship services and charismatic practices like speaking in tongues, faith healing, and deliverance.

The church is known for its Choices ministry, a ministry formed by Sy Rogers, former president of now-defunct Exodus International, in 1991. Currently, the ministry claims to offer counseling and support to individuals who struggle with their sexual orientation or gender identity.

In 2009, a group of women associated with the church engineered a takeover of the Association of Women for Action and Research, alleging that the feminist group was harbouring and pushing a "pro-gay agenda". They were eventually voted out at an extraordinary general meeting.

COOS is currently led by Senior Pastor Daniel Wee.

== Vision ==
The Church of Our Saviour defines its vision as, "Making people powerful in God. Restoring destinies. Transforming communities." Missions to foreign lands are hosted and conducted, with an emphasis on cultural sensitivity for relevancy. The beliefs of the church are defined as:

- God
- Jesus Christ
- Holy Spirit
- The Bible
- Salvation
- The Church

== Choices ministry ==
The Church of Our Saviour in 1991 established the ministry Choices with the purpose of assisting people "who struggle with homosexuality recover their God-intended sexual identity. In overcoming same-sex attractions, clients are empowered to take responsibility in maintaining moral and relational wholeness." Essentially a sexual orientation conversion therapy of a religious nature. Choices stated that it provides for "self-discovery and growth". It also emphasises having a nurturing environment and network to support the conversion.

Church of Our Saviour, in November 2007, included in its website a self-prepared document, which is a summation of various documents that speak against homosexuality as being a genetic trait. The document is based on the Christian belief that God abhors homosexuality. It also states that Choices has effectively converted homosexuals, though it offers no numbers or statistics on its website. The website has several testimonies from individuals who previously subscribed to the homosexual lifestyle and claim to have found healing with the help of the Choices ministry.

== Controversies ==
=== Treatment at Choices ministry ===
The Singaporean-managed homosexual support website, www.yawningbread.org, features a testimony of an ex-member of Church of Our Saviour, who suffered a nervous breakdown due to the treatment.

=== Opposition to repealing of homosexual conduct penal code 377a ===
In 2007, a review of the Singaporean Penal Code suggested that code 377a, which criminalises homosexual conduct between males, be removed. The Church of Our Saviour responded by adding to its website a "position statement" stating its firm stand against homosexuality and that homosexuality is a sin against God. In addition, Senior Pastor Derek Hong gave various sermons on the issue.

In a sermon in August 2007, titled "God's Church and Homosexuality", Hong insisted on the existence of an agenda by gay activists. In Hong's view, this agenda seeks to silence all ex-gay groups, eradicate anti-homosexuality groups such as churches, strive for legalising same-sex marriages, and strive to promote homosexuality as a viable lifestyle.

An email allegedly written by Derek Hong in April 2007 has surfaced, encouraging acquaintances to influence public opinion and lobby the government. The email recommends a suggested format of writing and to protest to REACH, a department under the Ministry of Digital Development and Information (MDDI) of the Singaporean government which is involved in connecting with citizens and gathering feedback on major issues. While there is no evidence that Hong was indeed the author of the email, and Hong himself has issued no statement regarding it, the forum topics at REACH's forums had a large number of postings adopting the recommended format.

=== Takeover of the Association of Women for Action and Research ===
Association of Women for Action and Research is an independent advocacy organization in Singapore, noted for its work towards gender equality in the country for 25 years. Its past campaigns led to revisions to the Penal Code, e.g. giving Singaporean women the same citizenship rights as men in 2004.

In March 2009, a majority of the management committee were replaced by members of the Church of Our Saviour, after an annual general meeting which was well-attended by members who had only recently joined AWARE. The takeover was organised by Thio Su Mien, former dean of Law at the National University of Singapore, who said she was concerned over AWARE's attempts to redefine marriage and family. Thio Su Mien who described herself as the "feminist mentor" is also the Senior Executive Director of TSMP Law Corporation and mother of Nominated MP, Thio Li Ann. Many letters to the national press questioned the nature of the reforms to be expected from the new committee members. An extraordinary general meeting was called by the members to carry out a vote of no-confidence on the new committee. Hong urged members of the church to join AWARE to support the new committee but was criticised by the Singapore's National Council of Churches for misusing his pulpit, for which Hong subsequently apologized. The new committee was ousted in May 2009 during the EGM.

Deputy Prime Minister Wong Kan Seng voiced his disapproval of the incident that "a group of conservative Christians, all attending the same church, which held strong views on homosexuality, had moved in and taken over AWARE because they disapproved of what AWARE had been doing", and called for tolerance, cautioning that religion and politics must be kept separate.
