= Walter John Napier =

English lawyer (1857–1945)

Sir Walter John Napier
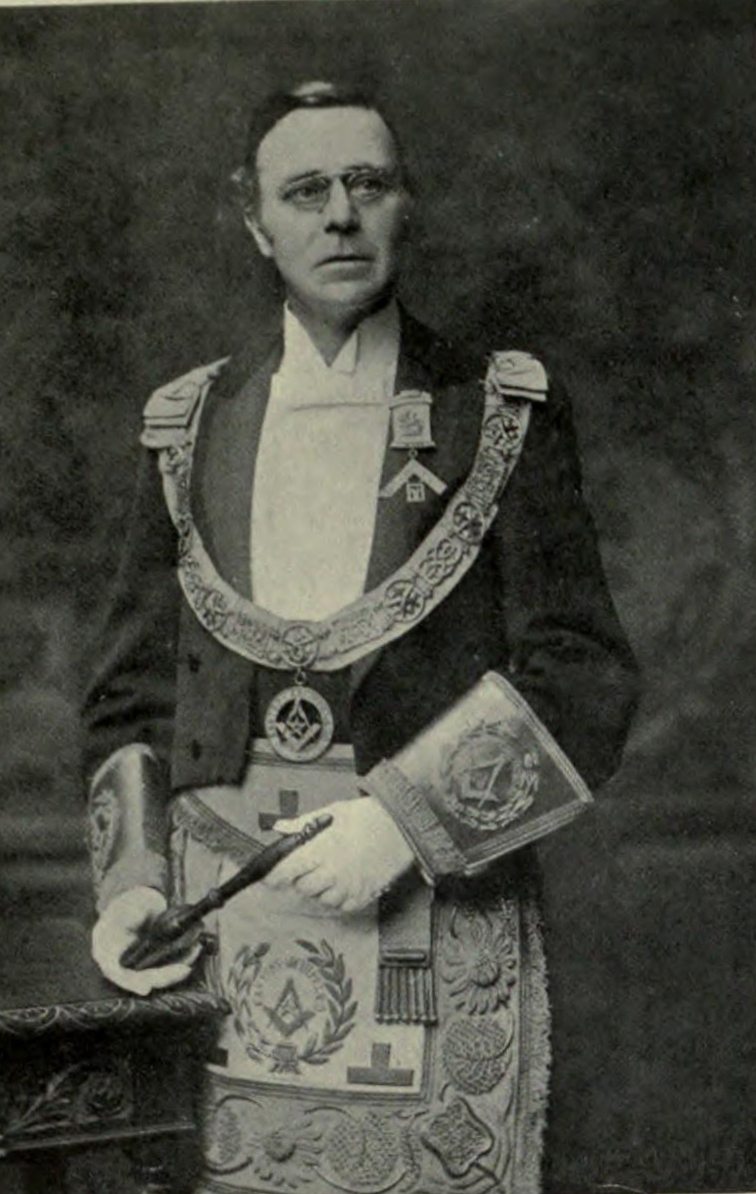

4th Attorney-General of the Straits Settlements
- In office 1 March 1907 – 31 December 1909
- Preceded by: William Robert Collyer

Deputy Attorney-General of Singapore

Personal details
- Born: 10 July 1857 Manchester, England
- Died: February 14, 1945 (aged 87)
- Education: University of Oxford (BA, DCL)

Sir Walter John Napier (10 July 1857 – 14 February 1945) was an English barrister who was the fourth Attorney-General of the Straits Settlements and the founder of the Singaporean law firm Drew and Napier.

== Early life ==
Napier was born in Manchester. He obtained a first-class honours degree in jurisprudence from the University of Oxford before being called to bar at Lincoln's Inn in 1881. After completing his pupillage in 1882, he practiced in his hometown for six years, before moving to Singapore in 1889.

== Life in Singapore ==
In March 1889, Napier founded what would become Drew and Napier with an English solicitor, Alfred Henry Drew. He was later appointed Attorney-General of the Straits Settlements on 1 March 1907, serving until 31 December 1909. Napier would implement a new civil procedure code, simultaneously serve as an unofficial member of the Legislative Council, and be the founding editor of the Straits Settlements Law Reports. He attained a Doctor of Civil Law from the University of Oxford in 1900, and was appointed a Knight Bachelor in 1909.

== Personal life ==
Napier was a freemason.
