= Association of Women for Action and Research =

Singaporean not-for-profit organisation

Association of Women for Action and Research (AWARE)
- Founded: 25 November 1985
- Type: Non-profit, Non-governmental organisation
- Registration no.: S85SS0089B
- Purpose: Gender Equality
- Location: Block 5, Dover Crescent, #01-22, Singapore
- Coordinates: 1°18′16″N 103°46′56″E
- Region served: Singapore
- Key people: Lim Shoon Yin, Executive Director
- Website: Official website

The Association of Women for Action and Research (AWARE) is a not-for-profit organisation that advocates for gender equality and provides critical support services for women in Singapore. It is a registered charity with Institute of Public Character status.

AWARE believes in the rights of women and men to make informed and responsible choices about their lives and to have equal opportunities in education, marriage and employment, and in the right of women to control their own bodies, particularly with regard to sexual and reproductive rights.

== Founding years ==
AWARE was formed in 1985 following a forum held by the National University of Singapore Society in November 1984. The forum, which was called "Women's Choices, Women's Lives", was organised by Zaibun Siraj, daughter of Mrs Mohamed Sirah, and Dr Vivienne Wee. Women from various professional backgrounds attended the forum. Speakers included orthopaedic surgeon Dr Kanwaljit Soin, director of the National Library Hedwig Anuar and deputy Sunday editor of the Singapore Monitor, Margaret Thomas.

Participants of the forum were unhappy with the government's rhetoric at the time, along with its introduction of controversial family and population policies. They were especially affected by how women were being singled out as being responsible for the falling fertility rate.

Following the forum, it was felt that there was a need for an organisation that would specifically focus on improving women's social and legal status in Singapore. Other women's groups were mostly social or welfare groups which did not engage in advocacy work. According to Siraj, these groups were not particularly seeking to change the status of women in society at the time.

AWARE was launched after a year of discussion, during which the organisation's structure was defined and its constitution written. The founding members included Hedwig Anuar, Dr Lai Ah Eng, Zaibun Siraj, Dr Vivienne Wee, Chua Siew Keng, Evelyn Wong, and Lena Lim.

== Philosophy ==
=== Vision ===
AWARE seeks to help create a society where there is true gender equality – where women and men are valued as individuals free to make informed and responsible choices about their lives.

=== Mission ===
AWARE seeks to remove all gender-based barriers so as to allow individuals in Singapore to develop their potential to the fullest and realise their personal visions and hopes.

=== Values ===
- AWARE embraces diversity, and promotes understanding and acceptance of diversity.
- AWARE respects the individual and the choices she makes in life, and supports her when needed.
- AWARE recognises the human rights of all, regardless of gender, so that everyone can realise their aspirations.

== AWARE's services ==
=== Women's Care Centre and Sexual Assault Care Centre ===
AWARE's Women's Care Centre provides information and support for women who are in distress or at a time of uncertainty in their lives.

The Sexual Assault Care Centre (SACC) provides free services to those who have experienced sexual assault and harassment, helping them deal with their experiences and make decisions about their next steps. The Centre oversees sexual assault and harassment cases, providing counselling, legal information and befriender services to survivors.

Both the Women's Care Centre and Sexual Assault Care Centre offer experienced counsellors to help women resolve a life crisis, deal with a painful past, adjust to changed circumstances or seek out new directions.

In 2014, the SACC launched a crowd-funding campaign which is supported by local artistes such as Zoe Tay and Judee Tan.

=== Women's Helpline ===
AWARE runs Singapore's only specialised hotline catered to women. The organisation's Helpline helps callers with a variety of concerns, and offers empathy, support, information and encouragement. Clients may also make an appointment to speak to a counsellor or lawyer. These calls and cases are kept strictly confidential.

=== Outreach ===
AWARE held an intensive five-month training programme for English-speaking Helpliners to equip them with knowledge on dealing with domestic violence, marital problems, mental health and LGBTQ matters.

From March 2018, the Helpline and Befriender services were made available in English, Malay, Tamil and Mandarin.

The organisation has also expanded its knowledge of Syariah law in order to better support Muslim women.

=== Counselling ===
AWARE provides professional counselling services for women. The organisation's staff is experienced in working with women on issues such as crisis and trauma, family violence, sexual assault and harassment, marital and psychological issues, as well as a wide range of other matters.

AWARE's Sexual Assault Care Centre provides three counselling sessions free of cost for survivors of sexual assault and harassment.

=== Legal information ===
AWARE offers a free legal clinic twice a month, with experienced lawyers providing women with legal information and advice. The organisation conducted 93 legal information sessions in 2016, with 85% of clients responding that the advice given by the lawyer helped them to make an informed decision.

=== Befriending ===
AWARE's Befriender service accompanies women who are victims of violence to the Family Justice Courts of Singapore, police stations, hospitals and other help centres. The Befrienders' presence helps women who are fearful of facing a Respondent face-to-face at mentions or hearings. AWARE conducted 45 befriending trips in 2016, with 93% of clients saying that the befrienders were encouraging and supportive. Befrienders services are arranged by referral through AWARE's Women's Helpline. Support Services staff then respond within three days.

== Research and advocacy ==
=== Research ===
==== Convention on the Elimination of All Forms of Discrimination Against Women (CEDAW) ====
Since 1998, AWARE has had a sub-committee that writes and submits shadow reports to the United Nations (UN) CEDAW, on the status of women and ongoing gender inequalities in Singapore. This shadow report serves as a complement to Singapore's national submission. AWARE has submitted three such shadow reports: one in 2007, one in 2011 and one in 2017.

AWARE was one of the 13 NGOs that submitted a joint report to the UN CEDAW Committee on 2 October 2017. The report was titled ‘Many Voices, One Movement’. This was the first time that the different NGOs collaborated to produce a joint report. The report highlighted various key recommendations, which included the adoption of gender quotas to improve women's representation in public positions (including the Cabinet); the elimination of the "head of household" concept from policy and decision-making; the implementation of a comprehensive anti-discrimination law to better prevent pregnancy discrimination and discrimination against Muslim women on the basis of religious garb; the decision to allow Muslims to choose to distribute estates in accordance with Muslim or civil law; as well as the removal of marital immunity for all sexual violence offences.

==== The Financial Cost of Caregiving ====
In 2018, AWARE started a qualitative research project to investigate the financial costs of caregiving for older persons in Singapore. AWARE interviewed 23 primary caregivers aged 45–65 within a span of two months, investigating how families decide on their care arrangements, including: whether to care at home or at a nursing home, whether to engage professional care services or hire a foreign domestic worker, and which family member should be the primary caregiver responsible for housing the care recipient and coordinating their care. Preliminary analysis of the data has revealed the challenges of balancing work and care for female caregivers, with many women leaving paid employment during their prime working years in order to provide care. AWARE's research looks into how this loss in income and increase in out-of-pocket care-related expenses results in financial insecurity for these women as they worry about having enough for their own future care needs.

=== Public campaigns ===
==== #asinglelove: Standing Up for Single Parents ====
#asinglelove is a campaign initiated by AWARE in collaboration with Kinetic Singapore and Daughters of Tomorrow (DOT), a non-governmental organisation which seeks to improve access to jobs for lower-income women. The campaign was organised to support and empower single parents, promote more supportive and equitable policies for them, and encourage welcoming and inclusive attitudes towards them.

AWARE conducted in-depth interviews with single mothers in 2016. The data from the research was gathered to provide material for AWARE's submissions to policy-makers. A report on single parents found that 95% of interviewees who sought public housing faced problems, from unrealistic income ceilings and long debarment periods to a lack of transparency and clarity in policies. The report also outlined the five biggest challenges that they encounter: housing, employment, childcare, poverty and stigma.

AWARE's petition for equal rights for single parents was also featured in various media outlets, including Cleo, a women's magazine.

==== Gender Equality is our Culture (GEC) Project ====
Gender Equality is our Culture (GEC) was a project running from September 2013 to December 2018, developed in collaboration with Solidaritas Perempuan in Indonesia. It was funded by the UN Women Fund for Gender Equality.

Through community engagement, the development of Muslim women's authentic voices, and collaborations within regional networks, GEC worked to counter the state's narrative that “culture” inhibits a full commitment to gender equality.

==== Aim For Zero ====
In November 2018, AWARE launched a two-year campaign called Aim For Zero, urging Singaporeans to move towards a society with zero sexual violence. This campaign was sparked by the global #MeToo movement that erupted in late 2017, whereby women spoke up about the sexual violence they had suffered in their lives. The rise of #MeToo was accompanied by a 79% spike in cases at AWARE's Sexual Assault Care Centre in October 2017.

Aim For Zero had an official launch event on 26 November 2018, International Day for the Elimination of Violence against Women. Guest-of-Honour for the opening event was Singapore's Minister for Law and Home Affairs, K Shanmugam. At the event, AWARE debuted a video featuring 10 Singaporean women talking about their own experiences of sexual violence, many for the first time.

=== Working with policy-makers ===
==== Single parents ====
The Ministry of National Development (MND) had responded to AWARE's in-depth December 2016 study on single parents, saying that it would take the organisation's findings into consideration.

Following the study, AWARE launched a petition on 15 May 2017, in conjunction with the International Day of Families, to lobby the Singapore government to give more help to single parents. The petition launch was accompanied by a video ("Single Parents Talk Housing"), showing six single mothers discussing the challenges they faced when they attempted to obtain housing.

Parliamentary push for housing access for single parents also helped to boost AWARE's stance on the issue. On 11 September 2017, Nee Soon Group Representation Constituency (GRC) MP Louis Ng submitted a separate petition to Parliament on behalf of seven single parents. The petition called for amendments to the Housing and Development Act to prevent discrimination based on marital status.

MP Louis Ng hoped that the petition would result in the recognition of unmarried parents and their children as a family nucleus to ensure their eligibility for public housing schemes. In addition, he hoped to remove debarment periods preventing divorced parents from renting from the HDB or owning subsidised flats.

AWARE's study, its petition, the parliamentary push by MP Louis Ng as well as the personal struggles of single parents were covered extensively by the mainstream media.

==== Female caregivers and older women ====
In 2017, AWARE cast a spotlight on the needs of female caregivers and older women in its advocacy related to Singapore's national budget. With increasing evidence that the impact of the ageing population falls disproportionately on women, the organisation urged the government to budget for care as a social good, rather than leaving its costs for families to address on their own.

As the government moved to enhance protection of older people from abuse with the Vulnerable Adults Act, AWARE also highlighted the importance of balancing the need to empower interventions by public agencies against the rights to privacy and due process. The organisation also emphasised, in the media conversation, the need to place elder abuse in the context of a wider caregiving infrastructure.

AWARE addressed similar concerns in its budget recommendations in 2018 and 2019.

==== Migrant spouses ====
AWARE has kept the rights of foreign spouses on Singapore policy-makers' agendas. AWARE worked with members of parliament to highlight the lack of rights and support for migrant spouses, particularly foreign wives of Singaporean citizen men, as a key women's rights matter at the UN Human Rights Council in June 2016.

To mark International Migrants’ Day in 2016, AWARE also released a policy brief calling for key reforms that would particularly help lower-income transnational families.

=== Strengthening civil society networks ===
Power Fund: Women's Fund For Change

AWARE announced the launch of the Power Fund: Women's Fund For Change, a fund to provide emerging women's rights groups with seed funding and other resources, at its annual fundraiser, The Love Ball, in September 2017.

==== Awards, honours and recognition ====
In 2015, AWARE was one of Just Cause Asia's top four recommended charities to donate to, out of 10 different women's-focused organisations. Just Cause Asia's conclusions were based on surveys of staff, volunteers, beneficiaries and partners, together with a review of finances and other key documents of each organisation. AWARE scored particularly highly in these areas: legal, governance and finance, mission and strategy, beneficiary and staff satisfaction and reputation.

A 2015 public value survey on AWARE conducted by Brightpurpose found that respondents valued AWARE's influence on policy and legislation, its visible, vocal role in driving discourse by taking public stands, its "strong hands-on grounding in its Support Services and its longevity and strong organisational ethos".

AWARE received gold-standard recognition when Singapore's Charity Council presented Charity Governance and Charity Transparency Awards to the organisation in 2016.

== Controversies ==
=== Attempted takeover by conservative Christian group ===
In 2009, the organisation made headlines when a group of women took over AWARE by winning 9 out of 12 available seats on its executive committee. Six out of nine of the new members of the committee had attended the same church, the anti-LGBT Church of Our Saviour (COOS) located at Margaret Drive. 80 of the 120 attendees of the meeting were also new members from the same church.

At the time, AWARE's constitution allowed new members to stand for elections. These new members, under the leadership of Josie Lau and Thio Su Mien, then nominated and voted in new members to the executive committee. They had alleged that AWARE was harbouring and pushing a “pro-gay agenda”.

Thio told reporters that she had encouraged the women to take over AWARE because she felt that AWARE's original focus on gender equality had shifted, claiming that “Aware seems to be only very interested in lesbianism and the advancement of homosexuality”. She then attacked AWARE's sex education syllabus, which came under the Ministry of Education’s (MOE) Comprehensive Sex Education (CSE) programme. Thio claimed that AWARE’s sex education had encouraged local students to view homosexuality in ‘neutral’ terms instead of ‘negatively’, warning that “this is something which should concern parents in Singapore”.

Without the knowledge of the previous leadership ("old guard"), the new members replaced the locks and security system at the AWARE Centre in Dover Crescent.

Eventually, after meetings, the old guard decided to challenge the new executive committee at an Extraordinary General Meeting (EGM) on 2 May 2009. After over eight hours, the meeting ended with a motion of no confidence being passed against the new guard.

Deputy Prime Minister Wong Kan Seng commented that "a group of conservative Christians, all attending the same church, which held strong views on homosexuality, had moved in and taken over AWARE because they disapproved of what AWARE had been doing." He called for tolerance and the separation of religion and politics.

"We were not concerned who would control Aware because it is just one of so many NGOs in Singapore. On homosexuality policy or sexuality education in schools, there can be strong differences in view but the government’s position was quite clear. It was not at stake. But what worried us was that this was an attempt by a religiously motivated group who shared a strong religious fervour to enter civil space, take over an NGO it disapproved of and impose its agenda. And it was bound to provoke a push back from groups who held the opposite view which happened vociferously and stridently as a fierce battle."

— Lee Hsien Loong in his National Day Rally speech, 2009

=== Male Members ===
AWARE had received prior criticism for not allowing its male members to take up ordinary memberships at the organisation.

However, male and non-binary members have recently been granted limited voting rights. At an EGM on 26 November 2016, over 60 members voted to give voting rights to Associate Members (men and non-binary persons) subject to a 25% cap on their votes on any resolution. The decision was supported by more than 70% of voting members. Male members currently make up about 7 per cent of AWARE's membership.

There was also a proposal to allow male members to take up roles on the board. However, the proposal was not pushed through as it could get only 58% of the votes. Changes to AWARE's Constitution can only be passed with support from at least two-thirds of the organisation's members.

=== Purple Light' Lyrics ===
In November 2013, AWARE made headlines when it brought to light certain lyrics which condoned sexual and physical violence being sung during National Service route marches. AWARE then wrote in to the Ministry of Defence (MINDEF) and the Singapore Armed Forces (SAF).

The lyrics are as shown below:

“Booking out, see my girlfriend,

Saw her with another man,

Kill the man, rape my girlfriend,

With my rifle and my buddy and me.”

The organisation was alerted to the lyrics when several men at a We Can! Workshop aimed at preventing sexual violence against women and girls told AWARE that they were disturbed by the cavalier attitude expressed toward sexual violence. In their view, such lyrics should not be part of the National Service (NS) experience.

MINDEF and SAF then agreed with AWARE's stance and replied that they would take steps to “immediately halt” the singing of these lyrics.

AWARE's raising of the issue, along with MINDEF and SAF's swift response in banning the lyrics, generated very intense discussions on the Internet about the significance of discontinuing the lyrics. The discourse was split into two camps - those who had supported and applauded AWARE's initiative, and those who strongly disagreed with the move by either problematising AWARE's objectives or faulting its approach to the issue.

Those who had criticised AWARE had done so for various reasons: that the original lyrics had not been offensive and the offensive lyrics were the brainchild of merely a few soldiers, that the song was merely a song and it does not have the capacity to cause soldiers to commit rape and that the singing of the song had to be analysed in context and soldiers were merely bonding over their shared grief of losing girlfriends to less preoccupied men outside of the army. While most netizens agreed that the song lyrics were indeed offensive, they took issue with the idea of a women's organisation attempting to supposed military tradition that women in Singapore were not forced to partake in. They had also argued that AWARE should have taken a more “sensitive” approach to the issue.

Some netizens, including men who had served in the army themselves, believed that the move was justified because rape culture in society should not be tolerated or condoned. They had argued that male bonding was not a reason to justify sexual assault or murder, and that if the lyrics were truly trivial, people would not have an issue with the particular verse being omitted from the song. While the incident was a heated one, it had also encouraged men themselves to speak up about the military culture experienced during NS.

=== Enhanced Benefits for operationally ready servicemen (NSmen) ===
In April 2014, Defence Minister Ng Eng Hen's announced that “more will be done to help (citizen soldiers) balance work and family with military service.” He also added that a “package” of “meaningful” benefits in housing, healthcare and education was being considered for citizen soldiers.

AWARE then posted a status on Facebook in response to the announcement, reiterating its opposition to additional benefits for NSmen. It argued that “every person deserves access to housing, education and healthcare, because these are basic requirements for human sustenance and social participation” and that “military service should not be held up as the single gold standard of citizen belonging”. The organisation also put forth the idea that the proposal might result in “different tiers of people with different social entitlements and worth.”.

The Facebook post also mentioned AWARE's stance against “any link between support for fundamental needs and an individual's status as an NSman, especially when the military may not be suitable for many people, regardless of their gender.”.

The post had garnered some negative feedback from netizens and had also made its way into mainstream news. Some had argued that AWARE was “jumping the gun”, that it lacked an “understanding of the need for NS” and that AWARE was not recognising the 2-year sacrifice of NSmen, being “compelled by law to sacrifice two years of their life to National Service”.

However, there were other netizens who expressed more measured responses, clarifying that AWARE was not against compensation for NSmen as a whole, but more specifically, the form of compensation that Minister Ng was proposing. One netizen also attempted to address the argument that AWARE should not “interfere” in issues of security, arguing that “women contribute to security in other ways, such as working and contributing to the economy, which supports the military, they take responsibility in other ways that are not easily seen or heard.”
