= Singapore International Mediation Centre =

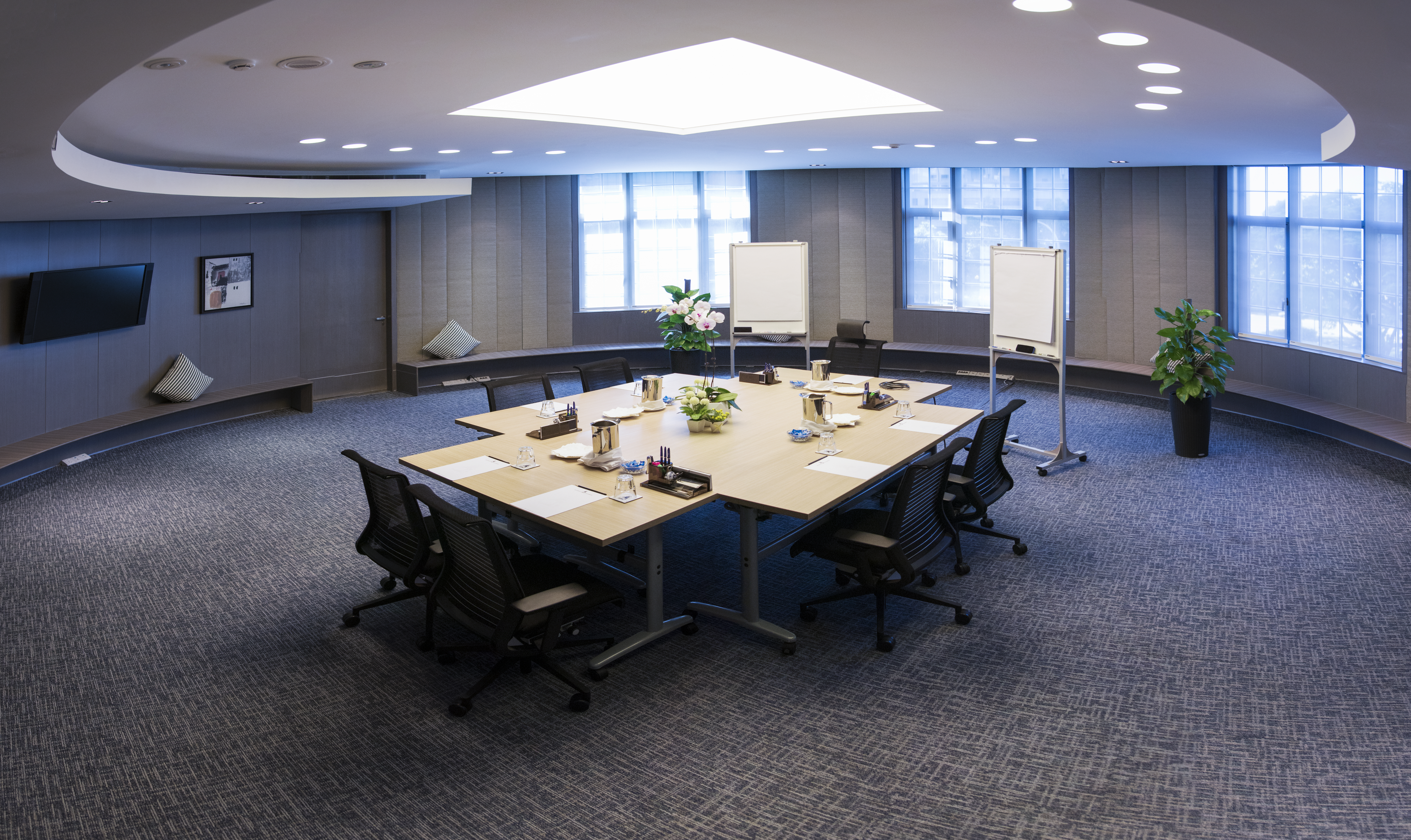
- A room used for mediation in Maxwell Chambers, where SIMC is housed
- Abbreviation: SIMC
- Formation: 2014
- Location: Maxwell Chambers
- Services: Mediation
- Chief Executive Officer: Chuan Wee Meng
- Deputy Chief Executive Officer: Joon-Nie Lau
- Board of directors: Lawrence Boo; Jeff Bullwinkel; Chow Kok Fong; Davinder Singh SC; Kevin Kim; George Lim SC; Gloria Lim; Lim Seok Hui; Lok Vi Ming SC; Ng Chai Ngee; Calvin Phua; Gregory Vijayendran SC
- Website: www.simc.com.sg

Singapore International Mediation Centre (SIMC) is an independent not-for-profit organisation in Singapore providing mediation services, through its panel of international mediators, to parties wishing to resolve their cross-border commercial disputes amicably. The centre is housed at Maxwell Chambers.

A working group, co-chaired by Edwin Glasgow CBE QC and George Lim SC, was set up in April 2013 by the Chief Justice of Singapore Sundaresh Menon and the Ministry of Law to assess and make recommendations on how to develop Singapore as a centre for international commercial mediation. In its report, the working group recognised the need for enhanced and sophisticated dispute resolution services for cross-border disputes to support the rise in trade and investment in Asia. The working group made various recommendations, including the establishment of an international mediation service provider offering a panel of international mediators and experts as well as user-centric products and services. This resulted in the establishment of SIMC, which was officially launched in November 2014 by the Chief Justice of Singapore and the Minister of Law, K Shanmugam.

SIMC complements the Singapore International Arbitration Centre (SIAC) and Singapore International Commercial Court (SICC); these three entities are designed to provide a full suite of dispute resolution options for parties involved in cross-border disputes. For instance, SIMC and SIAC administer the "Arb-Med-Arb" protocol, which allows a party to begin arbitration under SIAC before proceeding to mediation under SIMC. The aim is to allow settlements reached at mediation to be recorded as enforceable consent awards. Parties can avail themselves of the protocol by incorporating a model clause into their contracts.

SIMC maintains a panel of around 70 international mediators from 14 jurisdictions. They are certified by the Singapore International Mediation Institute, which acts as the professional standards body for mediation in Singapore. SIMC's panel of mediators include Singapore's Ambassador-at-Large Tommy Koh and William Ury. SIMC also maintains a panel of technical experts to assist in mediations involving specialised issues.

In July 2018, the United Nations Commission on International Trade Law concluded the Singapore Convention on Mediation, a treaty that makes it easier for businesses to enforce mediated settlement agreements across international borders. Formally known as the United Nations Convention on International Settlement Agreements Resulting from Mediation, the Singapore Convention was adopted on 20 December 2018 and opened for signature on 7 August 2019. It was signed by 46 countries on that day, the highest number of "first day" signatories for an UNCITRAL Convention.
