= TSMP Law Corporation =

Law firm in Singapore

The TSMP Law Corporation is a law firm in Singapore.

== History ==
In 1998, Thio Su Mien and Tan Bee Lian founded Thio Su Mien & Partners.

In 2001, the partnership was dissolved, and a new law corporation was formed by Thio and her son, Thio Shen Yi, named TSMP Law Corporation. Tan would still be practising with the TSMP until her retirement in 2018.

It later entered into a joint law venture with Allens Arthur Robinson, an Australian law firm, in 2007, which allowed Allens to practice Singapore law through TSMP. The venture was eventually dissolved.

In 2019, the partners of the firm formed a compliance consulting company, Integrium Private Limited.

As of 2018, it had over 60 lawyers. As of 2015, it paid its newly-qualified associates a $7,000 monthly salary.

== Pro-bono work ==
During the pandemic, TSMP delivered gift packs to frontline workers at the Singapore General Hospital. In 2020, it was noted as a Champion for Good by the National Volunteer And Philanthropy Centre. In 2023, TSMP began offering pro-bono legal services to victims of sexual harassment.

== Notable employees ==
=== Current employees ===
- Stefanie Yuen Thio, current joint managing partner of TSMP
- Thio Shen Yi SC, current joint managing partner of TSMP
- Jeffrey Chan SC, former deputy solicitor-general
- Professor Hans Tjio, legal academic and consultant
- Professor Tang Hang Wu, legal academic and consultant

=== Former employees ===
- Nadia Ahmad Samdin, member of parliament
- Adrian Tan, 27th president of the Law Society of Singapore
