= Maxwell Chambers =

Integrated alternative dispute resolution complex located in Singapore

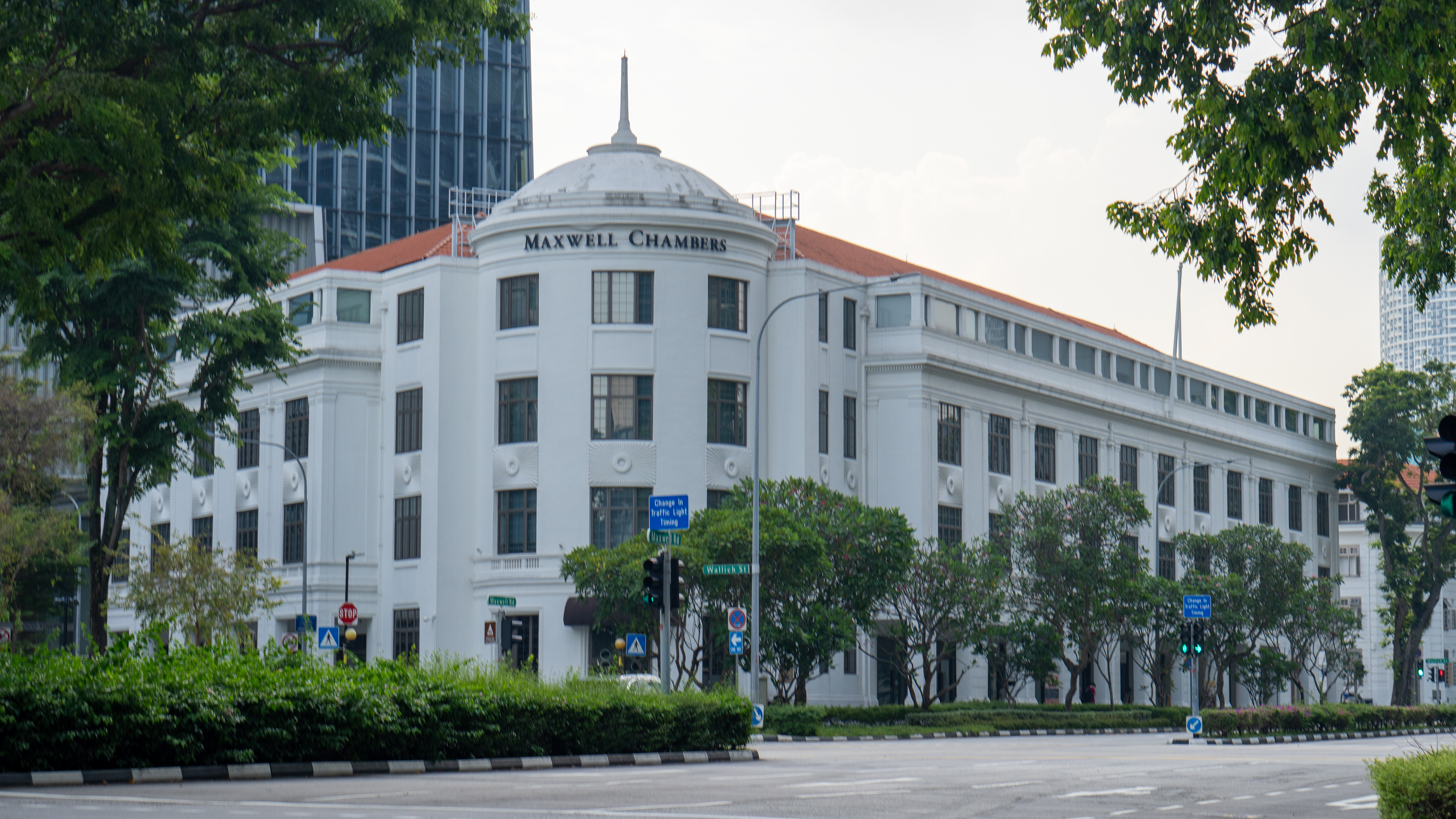
- Interactive map of Maxwell Chambers
- Former names: Custom House (1932 to 2010)
- Address: 32 Maxwell Road Singapore 069115
- Location: Singapore
- Coordinates: 1°16′39.5″N 103°50′46.1″E
- Public transit: Tanjong Pagar MRT
- Type: Historic site, events venue

Construction
- Built: 1932 (as Custom House)
- Opened: 21 January 2010; 15 years ago (as Maxwell Chambers); 8 August 2019; 6 years ago (Maxwell Chambers Suites extension)

Website
- maxwell-chambers.com

Maxwell Chambers is an integrated alternative dispute resolution (ADR) complex located in Singapore. It provides hearing rooms and facilities for the conduct of ADR hearings in Singapore, as well as the regional offices of a number of ADR institutions, arbitrators, and international arbitration practitioners.

Maxwell Chambers was established with seed money from the Singapore Government. The intention is for ownership to transfer to the private sector in due course.

On 5 January 2017, the Ministry of Law announced plans to triple the size of Maxwell Chambers with Maxwell Chambers Suites to boost Singapore's position as an international dispute resolution hub. The facility officially opened on 8 August 2019.

The current CEO of Maxwell Chambers is Ban Jiun Ean.

== History ==
The origins of Maxwell Chambers can be traced to 2002 when the Legal Services Working Group of the Economic Review Committee chaired by then Deputy Prime Minister Lee Hsien Loong stressed the need for “good infrastructure and facilities” to make Singapore a regional alternative dispute resolution service centre.

In 2005, the Ministry of Law started planning for the development of an integrated dispute resolution complex. The architects visited arbitration hearing centres around the world to get design ideas, and then added “a Singapore touch”.

In January 2007, Singapore's former Custom House was chosen as the site and design work commenced. Upon the completion of refurbishment works in July 2009, the building opened for hearings.

Maxwell Chambers was officially launched on 21 January 2010.

== Reception ==
The establishment of Maxwell Chambers was nominated by Global Arbitration Review (GAR) as one of the “Best Developments” in the arbitration industry in 2010.

GAR's first survey on hearing centres in 2013 found that Maxwell Chambers was one of the top three hearing centres that leading international arbitration lawyers were most likely to "recommend to a friend". Survey respondents remarked that Maxwell Chambers was “perfect”, “the standout facility” and “currently the gold standard”.

In GAR's Hearing Centres Survey for 2016, Maxwell Chambers was ranked second for most of the key factors respondents look out for in choosing a hearing centre, such as location, IT services, and helpfulness of staff.

== Building ==
Maxwell Chambers occupies the former Customs House located in Tanjong Pagar in Singapore's central business district. Built in 1932 during the British colonial era, the building was the headquarters of the Department of Customs and Excise for over 60 years. Following the refurbishment of the building, it was renamed Maxwell Chambers.

In 2007, the Urban Redevelopment Authority (URA) gave the building conservation status. In 2010, it was designated the 88th historic site in Singapore by the National Heritage Board.

The building was awarded the International Architecture Award for Best New Global Design (2010) by The Chicago Athenaeum Museum of Architecture and Design and the European Centre for Architecture Art Design and Urban Studies. In 2012, the building was also awarded an Architectural Heritage Award by Singapore's Urban Redevelopment Authority.

=== Maxwell Chambers Suites ===
The Ministry of Law announced on 5 January 2017 that Maxwell Chambers would triple in capacity by taking over the neighbouring building at 28 Maxwell Road (formerly known as the Red Dot Traffic Building), in order to support the growth of dispute resolution institutions which have seen significant increases in caseload.

At the official groundbreaking ceremony on 22 June 2017, the Ministry announced that the new offices would be renamed Maxwell Chambers Suites, as well as expanding even further due to "strong demand", with a second annexe block of 3,500 sq ft space, on top of the 120,000 sq ft originally planned.

Restoration works were completed in mid-2019. Maxwell Chambers Suites officially opened on 8 August 2019. It houses at least 11 international institutions and 20 disputes chambers and practices from 11 countries. The offices of the Law Society of Singapore have been based at Maxwell Chambers Suites since October 2019.

== Facilities ==
Maxwell Chambers offers 39 custom-designed and fully equipped hearing and preparation rooms, a business centre, and a lounge for arbitrators. It also provides audio-visual and video conferencing facilities and simultaneous translation and transcription.

== Tenants ==
Maxwell Chambers houses the regional offices of several ADR institutions including the Singapore International Arbitration Centre (SIAC), the Singapore International Mediation Centre (SIMC), the ICC Court of Arbitration, the American Arbitration Association’s (AAA) International Centre for Dispute Resolution (ICDR), the World Intellectual Property Organization (WIPO) Arbitration and Mediation Center, and the Singapore Chamber of Maritime Arbitration (SCMA). The Singapore International Mediation Centre (SIMC) will also be based at Maxwell Chambers.

A number of barristers’ chambers, law firms and arbitrators have a regional office at Maxwell Chambers including Essex Court Chambers, 20 Essex Street, 39 Essex Chambers, One Essex Court, Bankside Chambers, which are New Zealand’s "leading set of independent barristers, arbitrators and mediators", as well as Hanotiau & van den Berg.

== Signature Events ==
In addition to providing hearing facilities and office space, Maxwell Chambers also organises a number of signature events:

- Singapore International Arbitration Forum (SIAF)
- Maxwell ADR Forum
- Maxwell Lectures
