= Thio Su Mien =

Singaporean lawyer and academic (1938–2025)

- 张嗣绵
- Thio in 1969
- Born: 1938; Straits Settlements
- Died: 30 June 2025 (aged 86); Singapore
- Education: University of Singapore
- Occupations: Legal academic; lawyer
- Spouse: Thio Gim Hock (died 2020)
- Children: 3, including Li-Ann and Shen Yi

Thio Su Mien
- Simplified Chinese: 张嗣绵
- Traditional Chinese: 張嗣綿
Transcriptions
Standard Mandarin
- Hanyu Pinyin: Zhāng Sìmián
Yue: Cantonese
- Jyutping: Zoeng1 Si6-min4
Southern Min
- Hokkien POJ: Tiu^{n} Sū-mî

Huang Su Mien
- Simplified Chinese: 黄嗣绵
- Traditional Chinese: 黃嗣綿
Transcriptions
Standard Mandarin
- Hanyu Pinyin: Huáng Sìmián

Thio Su Mien (née Huang; 1938 – 30 June 2025) was a Singaporean legal academic and lawyer. She served as the dean of the Faculty of Law at the University of Singapore (now the National University of Singapore (NUS)) from 1968 to 1971, being the first woman to hold this position. Educated at the University of Malaya (which NUS later split from), she remained with the university as an educator after her graduation, eventually rising to the position of dean.

Thio left academia in 1971 and worked in private practice at Drew & Napier before founding her own firm, Thio Su Mien & Partners (now TSMP Law Corporation), in 1998. In 2009, she co-led a group of women attending the right-wing Church of Our Saviour that took over the executive council of the Association of Women for Action and Research (AWARE); however, they were removed through a motion of no confidence.

== Early life and career ==
Thio was born in 1938 to Reverend Huang Yang Ying, the founding principal of the Anglican High School. She had her early education at Anglo-Chinese School and graduated from the Faculty of Law of the University of Malaya in 1961 as part of the pioneer batch of law students that included Chan Sek Keong, Tommy Koh and Koh Kheng Lian, and was subsequently admitted to the Bar in 1963 by Chief Justice Wee Chong Jin. She also had a PhD from the London School of Economics. After her graduation, Thio remained at the University of Malaya to teach at the faculty. In 1968, she was promoted to Vice-Dean. She was subsequently made dean of the faculty replacing Geoffrey W. Bartholomew, making her the seventh dean of the faculty since its establishment in 1959, the youngest and the only woman to hold the post. She served from 1969 to 1971, before resigning that year from academia to work in private practice; she was succeeded by Koh.

In the 1980s, Thio became a partner at the Singaporean law firm Drew & Napier. She left the firm in 1998 as its head of its banking and corporate department. She subsequently founded the law firm Thio Su Mien & Partners; it is now run as TSMP Law Corporation by her son and daughter-in-law, Thio Shen Yi and Stefanie Yuen-Thio. Thio also served as a judge on the administrative tribunals of the World Bank Group and Asian Development Bank.

== Takeover of AWARE ==
On 8 March 2009, a group of women attending the right-wing Church of Our Saviour took over the executive council of the Association of Women for Action and Research (AWARE), a non-governmental organization in Singapore promoting gender equality. Led by Josie Lau and Thio, they alleged that AWARE was harbouring and pushing a "pro-gay agenda". Six of the 11 newly elected councillors were church members who had only joined the group three months prior to the election. 120 members of AWARE attended, while usual attendance was around 30; of the 120 attendees, 80 were new members who had also joined via the church. In defending the new council, Thio called herself its "feminist mentor". The old guard initiated a motion of no confidence and the new council was voted out of office on 2 May 2009. Of the 2,175 people who voted on the motion, 1,414 voted for it.

When queried by the media, Deputy Prime Minister Wong Kan Seng commented, "A group of conservative Christians, all attending the same church, which held strong views on homosexuality, had moved in and taken over AWARE because they disapproved of what AWARE had been doing." He called for tolerance and the separation of religion and politics. It has been said that the incident "showed the best and worst of fledging civil society" and underscores "the challenge to properly situate the role of religion and secular reason in public life in Singapore."

== Personal life ==
Thio was married to Thio Gim Hock, former chairperson of OUE Limited and Olympic water polo player, until his death in 2020; they had three children, Thio Li-Ann, Thio Shen Yi, and Thio Chi Ann (Rajah).

Thio was a Christian. In 2004, she reportedly blamed the 2003 SARS outbreak in Singapore on its stance on abortion, and asserted that prayers for mercy and forgiveness had prevented Singapore from being affected by the 2004 Indian Ocean earthquake and tsunami.

=== Death ===
Thio was diagnosed with acute myeloid leukaemia in early May 2025, and died of it on 30 June 2025 at around 4 a.m. SGT, at the age of 86. On her death, many notable individuals paid tribute to her for her role in the legal profession.
