= International Day of Families =

International observance, May 15

The International Day of Families is observed on 15 May every year. The Day was proclaimed by the UN General Assembly in 1993 with resolution A/RES/47/237 and reflects the importance the international community attaches to families. The International Day provides an opportunity to promote awareness of issues relating to families and to increase knowledge of the social, economic and demographic processes affecting families.

== Themes ==
Every year, the UN secretary-general announces a theme for the International Day of Families.

- 2026 - "Families, Inequalities et Child Wellbeing"
- 2025 - "Family-Oriented Policies for Sustainable Development: Towards the Second World Summit for Social Development"
- 2024 - "Families and Climate Change"
- 2023 - "Family Demographic Trends"
- 2022 - "Families and Urbanization"
- 2021 - "Families and New Technologies"
- 2020 - "Families in Development: Copenhagen & Beijing + 25”
- 2019 - "Families and Climate Action: Focus on SDG 13"
- 2018 - "Families and inclusive societies"
- 2017 - "Families, education and well-being"
- 2016 - "Families, healthy lives and sustainable future"
- 2015 - "Men in charge? Gender equality and children's rights in contemporary families"
- 2014 - "Families Matter for the Achievement of Development Goals; International Year of the Family + 20"
- 2013 - "Advancing Social Integration and Intergenerational Solidarity"
- 2012 - "Ensuring work family balance"
- 2011 - "Confronting Family Poverty and Social Exclusion"
- 2010 - "The impact of migration on families around the world"
- 2009 - "Mothers and Families: Challenges in a Changing World"
- 2008 - "Fathers and Families: Responsibilities and Challenges"
- 2007 - "Families and Persons with Disabilities"
- 2006 - "Changing Families: Challenges and Opportunities"
- 2005 - "HIV/AIDS and Family Well-being"
- 2004 - "The Tenth Anniversary of the International Year of the Family: A Framework for Action"
- 2003 - "Preparations for the observance of the Tenth Anniversary of the International Year of the Family in 2004"
- 2002 - "Families and Ageing: Opportunities and Challenges"
- 2001 - "Families and Volunteers: Building Social Cohesion "
- 2000 - "Families: Agents and Beneficiaries of Development"
- 1999 - "Families for all ages"
- 1998 - "Families: Educators and Providers of Human Rights"
- 1997 - "Building Families Based on Partnership"
- 1996 - "Families: First Victims of Poverty and Homelessness"
