= Insolvency and Public Trustee's Office =

Logo of the Insolvency and Public Trustee's Office

The Insolvency and Public Trustee's Office (IPTO) in Singapore is a department under the Ministry of Law. IPTO oversees the administration of individual and corporate insolvencies, the administration of small intestate estates and un-nominated Central Provident Fund (CPF) monies, as well as the licensing and regulation of moneylenders and pawnbrokers.

== History of IPTO ==
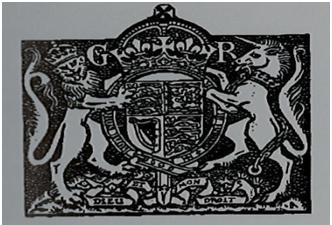
Logo of the Bankruptcy Department

IPTO was set up in 1888 as the Bankruptcy Department following an increase in bankruptcy petitions filed in the Supreme Court of the Straits Settlements. The Bankruptcy Department's duties were expanded in 1948 to include the custody of enemy property and the administration of trusts and estate matters. It was also renamed as the Official Assignee and Public Trustee (OAPT) to more aptly describe the role that it played.

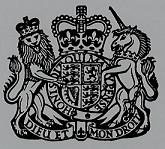
Logo of the Official Assignee and Public Trustee

On 1 May 1983, following the transfer of responsibilities from the Ministry of Social Affairs to the Ministry of Law, OAPT was appointed as the Registrar of Moneylenders and Pawnbrokers. As of 1 April 1997, OAPT became an autonomous agency and was renamed the Insolvency and Public Trustee's Office (IPTO), a department under the Ministry of Law.

== Roles of IPTO ==
=== Individual Insolvency ===
IPTO assists the Official Assignee (OA), who is a public officer and an officer of the court, in the discharge of his / her duties under the Bankruptcy Act. In administering the bankruptcy estate, IPTO realises the bankrupt's assets for the benefit of his creditors, adjudicates creditors’ claims and pays out dividends to them. IPTO also investigates the conduct of bankrupts (where they are found to have flouted the Bankruptcy Act), and in suitable cases, assists bankrupts in attaining a discharge from bankruptcy. Some programmes administered by IPTO include the Debt Repayment Scheme and Financial Education Workshop

=== Corporate insolvency ===
IPTO assists the Official Receiver (OR), who is a public officer, in exercising his or her duties as the liquidator of companies which are compulsorily wound-up. The OR's duties are to, amongst others, investigate the affairs of the company, realise the company's assets, adjudicate the claims of creditors and distribute the company's assets in accordance with the Companies Act. The OR also oversees the conduct of liquidators in both compulsory and voluntary winding-up by ensuring that liquidators comply with their legal obligations.

=== Public Trustee ===
The Public Trustee (PT) administers the estates of deceased persons if the value of the estate, excluding monies from the deceased person's CPF account, does not exceed S$50,000. The PT also administers un-nominated CPF funds of a deceased person. Where a beneficiary of an estate or funds administered is a minor, IPTO will hold the minor's share until the minor attains the age of majority.

Other roles undertaken by the PT include maintaining the confidential Wills Registry, as well as ensuring that out-of-court settlement sums for personal injuries sustained in road traffic accidents are adequate and that solicitors’ fees are reasonable.

=== Licensing and regulation of moneylenders and pawnbrokers ===
IPTO assists the Registrar of Moneylenders and the Registrar of Pawnbrokers in licensing and regulating moneylenders and pawnbrokers in Singapore. To safeguard the interests of borrowers and pawners, IPTO may take appropriate enforcement action against licensees who breach the Moneylenders Act or the Pawnbrokers Act.

== See also ==
- Ministry of Law (Singapore)
