= Jeffrey Pinsler =

Singapore academic

Jeffrey Pinsler SC PBM is a Singaporean legal academic and lawyer. He was appointed an emeritus Professor at the National University of Singapore's Faculty of Law in May 2022, having previously served as the Geoffrey Bartholomew Professor of Law and Senior Professorial Fellow of the Singapore Institute of Legal Education. In his time at NUS, Pinsler has served as Vice Dean, Chair of the Faculty Search Committee and was also a member of the university's Board of Discipline. In August 2022, he concurrently took on an appointment as a consultant at Drew & Napier.

== Education and academic career ==
Pinsler graduated from the University of Liverpool and started out his legal career as a lawyer in Drew and Napier from 1981 to 1985 in the field of admiralty under Mr GP Selvam. He subsequently joined the faculty of the National University of Singapore's Faculty of Law in 1986, where he has remained ever since. Pinsler also holds an LLM from the University of Cambridge.

== Professional recognition ==
Pinsler is "regarded as the leading authority in evidence, procedure, and ethics and professional responsibility". He has produced 16 major works and multiple articles in his capacity as writer and/or general editor, many of which are essential references by practitioners and regularly relied on by the Singapore Courts, and he has been cited in over 600 judgements.

In 2004, Pinsler was awarded the LL.D. by his alma mater, the University of Liverpool, in recognition of his "supreme academic distinction in law".

== Awards ==
Pinsler was appointed Senior Counsel in 2008, and is one of the few Senior Counsel in academia in Singapore. He also received the Academy Publishing Award in 2018.

Pinsler received the Public Service Medal in 2006 and was also awarded the NUS Law Long Service Award in 2015 and 2020.

== Personal life ==
Pinsler is married to Leena, a consultant with Drew & Napier LLC.
