= The Teenage Textbook Movie =

- Directed by: Phillip Lim
- Written by: Phillip Lim; Haresh Sharma; Edmund Tan
- Produced by: Jonathan Foo
- Starring: Melody Chen; Caleb Goh; Steven David Lim; Lim Hwee Sze; Chong Chee Kin
- Edited by: Walter Tan
- Distributed by: Cathay Organisation
- Release date: November 1998
- Running time: 100 minutes
- Country: Singapore
- Language: English

The Teenage Textbook Movie is a film adaptation of Adrian Tan's bestselling 1988 novel The Teenage Textbook. It is a lighthearted look at the lives of four students in Singapore as they start junior college.

== Premise ==
When Mui Ee attends Paya Lebar Junior College with her best friend Sissy Song, she encounters a new life form: boys. There are many, but only one will win her heart.

== Cast ==
- Melody Chen as Mui Ee
- Caleb Goh as Chung Kai
- Steven David Lim as Daniel Boon
- Lim Hwee Sze as Sissy Song
- Chee Kin Chong as Hok Sean
- Vivian Wang as Miss Boon
- Darryl David as Captain Hari
- Randall Tan as Tom D'Cruz
- Neo Swee Lin as Mui Ee's mother
- Chong Chee Kin
- Royston Tan

== Reception ==
Yong Siew Fern of The New Paper rated the film 3 stars out of 5 and wrote that "Unobtrusive acting and music-video editing combine to make this movie very much like your teen years - it will pass at its strolling pace, but it will be entertaining." Tan of Sinema felt that the "script was very well-written and although some parts were a little off in execution, it was an amazing adaptation of the book.".
