= Legal Aid Bureau =

Government department in Singapore

- Legal Aid Bureau

Agency overview
- Jurisdiction: Government of Singapore
- Website: www.mlaw.gov.sg/content/lab/en.html
- Agency ID: T08GA0039B

The Legal Aid Bureau (LAB) in Singapore is a department under the Ministry of Law of the Government of Singapore. LAB provides legal representation and advice in civil matters to persons of limited means. The department is headed by the Director of Legal Aid.

== History ==
LAB was set up on 1 July 1958, following the passing of the Legal Aid and Advice (Amendment) Bill on 11 June 1958. The Legal Aid and Advice Ordinance later became the Legal Aid and Advice Act – the key legislation that governs the work of LAB. In 1984, LAB became a department under the Ministry of Law.

== Scope of work ==
The Legal Aid Scheme covers civil matters such as divorce, custody of children, adoption, wrongful dismissal, letters of administration/probate, tenancy disputes, claims in contract and tort. It does not cover criminal matters.

Legal aid applicants receive help in the form of legal advice, legal representation in court proceedings as well as legal assistance in the drafting of legal documents like Deeds of Separation. LAB only handles civil proceedings in the Supreme Court, the Subordinate Courts and the Syariah Court .

Given that Legal Aid is meant to help less privileged Singapore citizens and Permanent Residents, persons who want to apply for Legal Aid have to satisfy both a Means Test – which determines a person’s financial eligibility based on his disposable income and disposable capital – and a Merits Test – which determines if there are reasonable grounds for taking up, continuing or defending the court action – before legal aid is provided.

== Partnerships ==
Legal aid cases are handled by LAB’s in-house lawyers as well as private lawyers who volunteer their time and services as Assigned Solicitors.

== See also ==
- Ministry of Law (Singapore)
