= Law Society of Singapore =

Singaporean professional association for lawyers

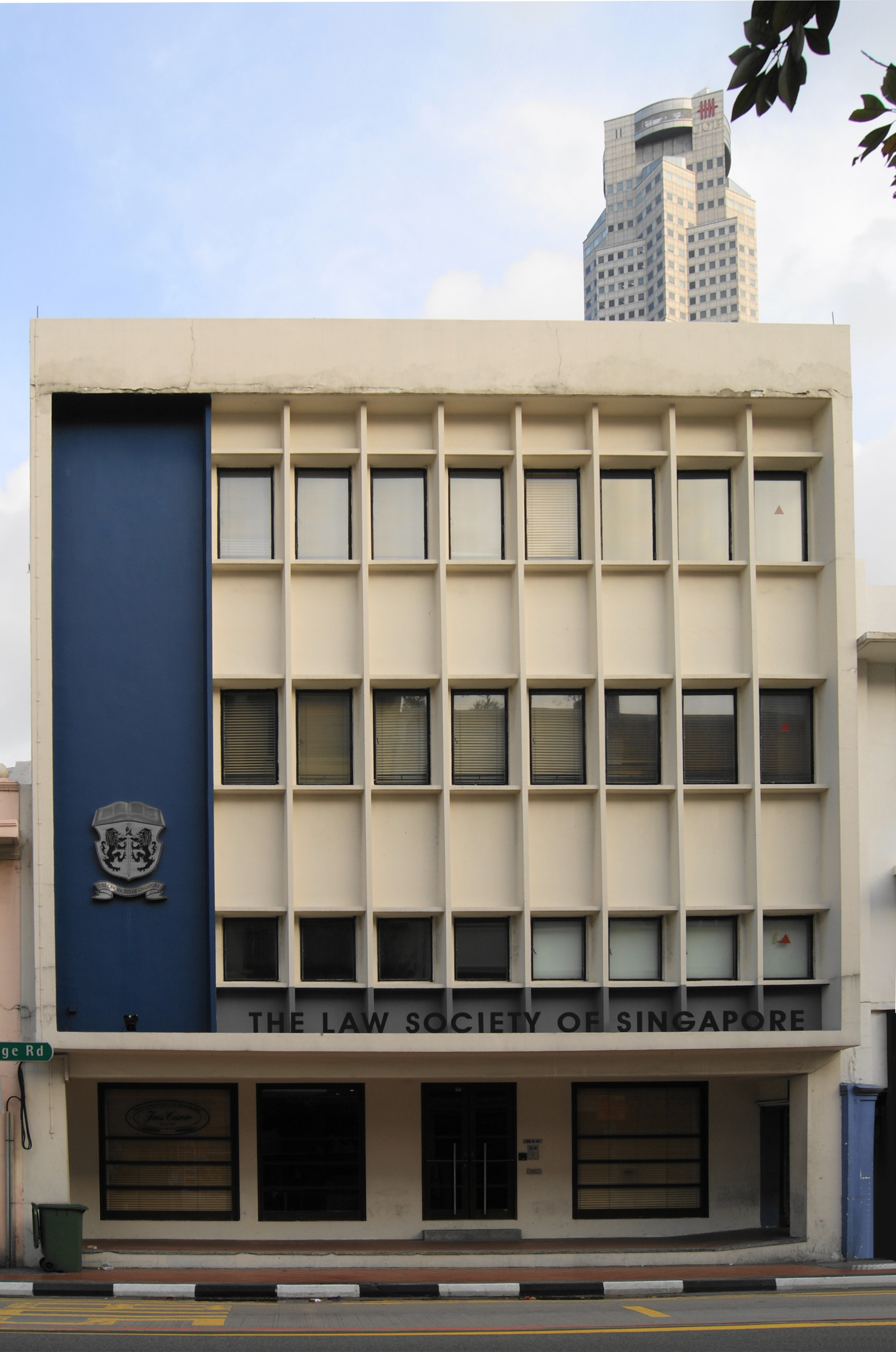
- The headquarters of the Law Society of Singapore at South Bridge Road, 2012
- Formation: 1967; 59 years ago
- Type: Bar association
- Purpose: To serve its members and the public by sustaining an independent bar which upholds the rule of law and ensures access to justice
- Headquarters: Maxwell Chambers
- Region served: Singapore
- Official language: English
- President: Dinesh Singh Dhillon
- Website: https://www.lawsociety.org.sg/

The Law Society of Singapore is a law society which represents all lawyers in Singapore. It is analogous to a bar association in other countries.

The society's motto is "An Advocate for the Profession, An Advocate for the Community." It moved its premises from South Bridge Road to Maxwell Chambers in 2019.

== Activities ==
The society provides services and support to lawyers in Singapore, does advocacy for issues affecting its members, publishes the Law Gazette, and operates a pro bono scheme to provide access to justice for those who may not be able to afford it. Other services that it offers include:

- Providing an announcement/notice dissemination service for members' notices, such as notices of a change in the name of a law practice, a change in the composition of the partners/directors in a law practice, change in contact details, and office closures
- From 1 November 2019, it has administered an Unclaimed Money Fund to hold money left in lawyers' client accounts that are unclaimed by clients
- It administers various alternative dispute resolution schemes, including an arbitration scheme, mediation scheme, and neutral evaluation and determination scheme

It also publishes advisories and guidelines for lawyers relating to various matters, including ethics and professional responsibility and advertising of legal services.

=== Committees ===
The society has various standing committees tasked with managing particular issues or areas of practice, including an advocacy committee, alternative dispute resolution committee, civil practice committee, information technology committee, amongst others.

=== Disciplinary proceedings ===
Under the Legal Profession Act 1967, when the Council of the Law Society receives a complaint against a lawyer, it will refer the complaint to the chairperson of the society's Inquiry Panel, who may constitute a Review Committee to review the complaint.

The Review Committee will determine whether the complaint is frivolous, vexatious, misconceived, or lacking in substance and should therefore be dismissed, or should be referred to the chairperson of the Inquiry Panel, who will then constitute an Inquiry Committee to inquire into the complaint.

The Inquiry Committee will report its findings and recommendations to the council, who will decide if a formal investigation is necessary. If it does so determine, it may apply to the Chief Justice to appoint a Disciplinary Committee that will hear and investigate the matter.

If the Disciplinary Committee finds that there has been cause of sufficient gravity for disciplinary action to be taken against the lawyer who is the subject of the complaint, the society will make an application to the Court of Three Judges for an appropriate order against the lawyer, such as an order that the lawyer be censured, fined, suspended, or struck off the roll.

== Controversies ==
=== 2025 president appointment controversy ===
On 10 December 2025, a group of former members, led by Peter Cuthbert Low and Chandra Mohan Nair, called an extraordinary general meeting (EGM) for 22 December, protesting the presidency of Dinesh Singh Dhillon. In a letter addressed to The Straits Times the previous day, they stated that they intended to discuss "the impact of his appointment on the independence of the Bar". However, the resolution did not include provisions to invalidate office-holders. Dhillon, then a non-elected member of the council, had been elected that October at the society's annual election.

Thio Shen Yi, a former president of the society, opposed the EGM, saying that it would cause weakening internal divisions and that Dhillon had been elected "fair and square". He also said that the election had observed due process and that the society had no convention against the election of a non-elected councillor to its presidency. On 17 December, after a meeting with members, Dhillon agreed to step aside as president and will be endorsed as vice-president. Professor Tan Cheng Han will be reconstituted as president.

== Leadership ==
| Year | President | Ref |
|---|---|---|
| 1963–1964 | Tan Chye Cheng | |
| 1965 | Po Guan Hock | |
| 1966 | C. F. J. Ess | |
| 1967 | C. C. Tan | |
| 1968 | H. P. Godwin | |
| 1969–1972 | G. Starforth Hill | |
| 1973–1974 | M. Karthigesu | |
| 1975–1977 | H. L. Wee | |
| 1978 | M. Karthigesu | |
| 1979 | Phyllis P. L. Tan | |
| 1980–1983 | T. P. B. Menon | |
| 1984–1985 | Harry Elias SC | |
| 1986 | Francis Seow | |
| 1987–1989 | Giam Chin Toon SC | |
| 1990–1992 | C. R. Rajah SC | |
| 1993–1994 | Peter Cuthbert Low | |
| 1995–1997 | Chandra Mohan K. Nair | |
| 1998–1999 | George Lim Teong Jin SC | |
| 2000–2002 | Palakrishnan SC | |
| 2003 | Arfat Selvam | |
| 2004–2007 | Philip Jeyaretnam SC | |
| 2008–July 2010 | Michael Hwang SC | |
| August 2010 – 2012 | Wong Meng Meng SC | |
| 2013–2014 | Lok Vi Ming SC | |
| 2015–2016 | Thio Shen Yi SC | |
| 2017–2021 | Gregory Vijayendran SC | |
| 2022–July 2023 | Adrian Tan Gim Hai | Died in office |
| July 2023 - November 2023 | Jason Chan Tai-Hui SC | |
| November 2023–present | Lisa Sam Hui Min | |

== See also ==
- Law society
