= Drew & Napier =

Singapore law firm

Drew & Napier LLC
- Headquarters: Singapore
- No. of offices: 3
- No. of employees: 500+
- Major practice areas: Full service firm
- Key people: Jimmy Yim (Chairman); Cavinder Bull (CEO); Ong Sim Ho (Deputy CEO)
- Date founded: 1889; 137 years ago
- Founder: Alfred Henry Drew; Sir Walter John Napier
- Company type: Limited liability company
- Website: www.drewnapier.com

Drew & Napier LLC is a Singaporean law firm. Founded in 1889, the firm has more than 500 employees. It is regarded as one of the Big Four law firms in Singapore.

In Singapore, Drew & Napier is particularly known for their litigation, ADR, insolvency and transactional work. The firm has market-leading practices in mergers and acquisitions, Technology, Media, and Telecommunications (TMT), data protection and cybersecurity, anti-trust/competition, corporate finance, employment, property, and construction law.

The chairman and chief executive officer of the firm are Senior Counsel Jimmy Yim and Cavinder Bull respectively.

The firm has four senior counsels – Jimmy Yim, Cavinder Bull, Blossom Hing and Emeritus Professor Jeffrey Pinsler.

In 2020, Drew & Napier formed Drew Network Asia (DNA) with other law firms in Southeast Asia - Shearn Delamore & Co. from Malaysia, and Makarim & Taira S. from Indonesia. In 2021 and 2023 respectively, the network further expanded with the additions of Philippine law firm Martinez Vergara & Gonzalez Sociedad (MVGS) and Bangkok-headquartered law firm Tilleke & Gibbins.

== History ==
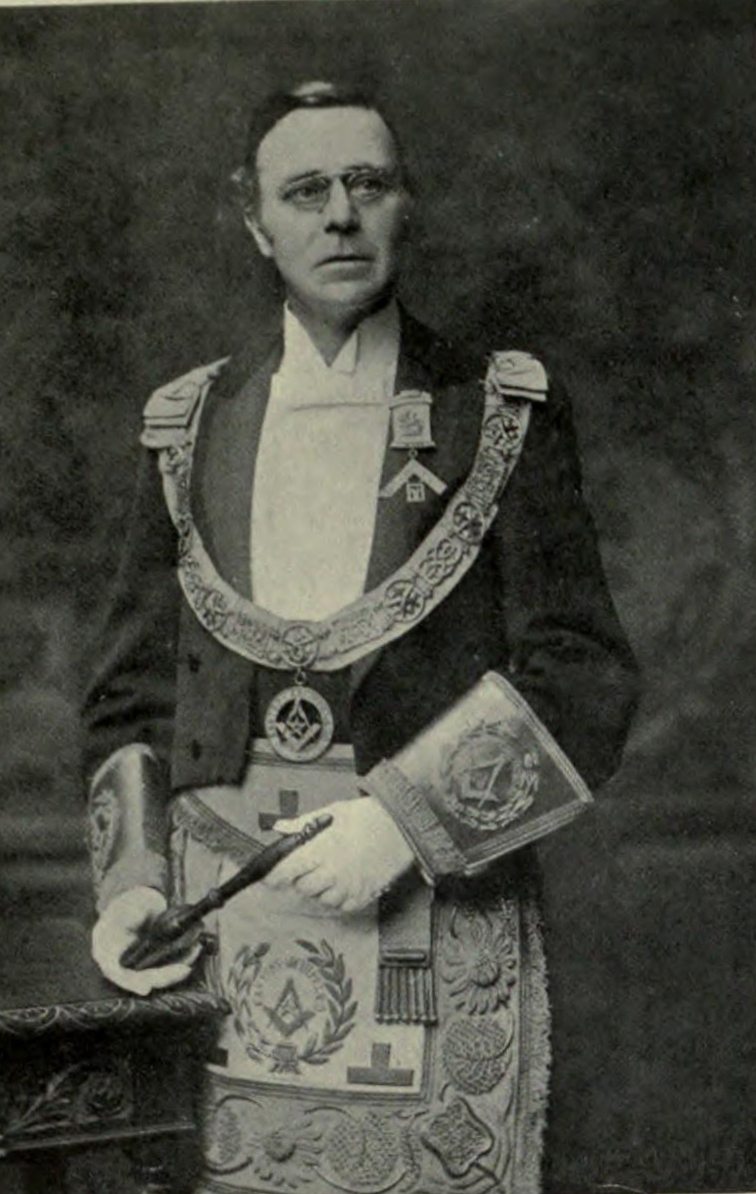
Walter John Napier

The firm was founded in 1889 in Singapore, part of the Straits Settlements, when Manchester barrister Walter John Napier joined English solicitor Alfred Henry Drew.

In 2000, Drew & Napier was corporatised to form a limited liability company. The firm in 2011 moved to its current location at Ocean Financial Centre, Collyer Quay, Singapore.

== Notable alumni ==
Government

- David Marshall – Singapore's first Chief Minister
- Hri Kumar Nair, SC – former Deputy Attorney-General
- Indranee Rajah, SC – Cabinet Minister
- Joseph Grimberg, SC - Judicial Commissioner of the Supreme Court; first Senior Counsel
- Judith Prakash – Judge of Appeal of the Court of Appeal of Singapore
- Lucien Wong, SC – Attorney-General of Singapore
- Steven Chong – Judge of Appeal of the Court of Appeal of Singapore
- S. Jayakumar - Cabinet Minister and law professor
- K Shanmugam, SC – Cabinet Minister

Legal

- Tan Cheng Han, SC – Former Dean of NUS Law; Chairman, Singapore Exchange Regulation Co
- Davinder Singh, SC – Chairman, Singapore International Arbitration Centre
- Cavinder Bull, SC - Chief Executive Officer
- Thio Su Mien, legal academic and lawyer
