= Ministry of Law (Singapore) =

Government ministry in Singapore

Agency overview
- Formed: 5 June 1959; 67 years ago
- Jurisdiction: Government of Singapore
- Headquarters: 100 High Street, #08-02 The Treasury, Singapore 179434
- Motto: A Trusted Legal System, A Trusted Singapore
- Employees: 1,022
- Annual budget: ▲ S$555.57 million (2019)
- Ministers responsible: Edwin Tong, Minister; Murali Pillai, Senior Minister of State; Eric Chua, Senior Parliamentary Secretary
- Agency executives: Luke Goh, Permanent Secretary; Colin Chow, Deputy Secretary (Policy); Charlene Chang, Deputy Secretary (Development)
- Child agencies: Intellectual Property Office of Singapore; Singapore Land Authority
- Website: www.mlaw.gov.sg
- Agency ID: T08GA0018G

The Ministry of Law (MinLaw; Malay: Kementerian Undang-Undang; Chinese: 律政部; Tamil: சட்ட அமைச்சு) is a ministry of the Government of Singapore responsible for the advancement in access to justice, the rule of law, the economy and society through policy, law and services.

== Organisational structure ==
The Ministry of Law comprises several key components. At its core is the headquarters, which are supported by four departments: the Insolvency and Public Trustee's Office, the Legal Aid Bureau, the Anti-Money Laundering and Countering the Financing of Terrorism Division and the Community Mediation Unit (CMCs), which oversees the Community Mediation Centres located at The Treasury and the State Courts of Singapore. Additionally, the ministry includes three boards and tribunals: the Appeals Board for Land Acquisitions, the Land Surveyors Board and the Copyright Tribunal. It also administers two statutory boards, the Intellectual Property Office of Singapore (IPOS) and the Singapore Land Authority (SLA).

== Ministers ==
The Ministry of Law is headed by the Minister for Law, who is appointed as part of the Cabinet of Singapore. The ministry was established following the 1959 general election under Lee Kuan Yew's First Cabinet, with K. M. Byrne serving as its inaugural minister. Since its formation, all individuals who have held the position of Minister for Law have been members of the People's Action Party (PAP). The incubment minister is Edwin Tong, an MP for East Coast GRC from the People's Action Party.

Minister	Took office	Left office	Party	Cabinet
K. M. Byrne; MP for Crawford (1913–1990)	5 June 1959	17 October 1963	PAP	Lee K. I
None (18 October 1963 – 31 October 1964)				Lee K. II
E. W. Barker; MP for Tanglin (1920–2001)	1 November 1964	12 September 1988	PAP	Lee K. II
E. W. Barker; MP for Tanglin (1920–2001)	1 November 1964	12 September 1988	PAP	Lee K. III
E. W. Barker; MP for Tanglin (1920–2001)	1 November 1964	12 September 1988	PAP	Lee K. IV
E. W. Barker; MP for Tanglin (1920–2001)	1 November 1964	12 September 1988	PAP	Lee K. V
E. W. Barker; MP for Tanglin (1920–2001)	1 November 1964	12 September 1988	PAP	Lee K. VI
E. W. Barker; MP for Tanglin (1920–2001)	1 November 1964	12 September 1988	PAP	Lee K. VII
S. Jayakumar; MP for Bedok GRC (until 1997) and East Coast GRC (from 1997) (born 1939)	12 September 1988	30 April 2008	PAP	Lee K. VIII
S. Jayakumar; MP for Bedok GRC (until 1997) and East Coast GRC (from 1997) (born 1939)	12 September 1988	30 April 2008	PAP	Goh I
S. Jayakumar; MP for Bedok GRC (until 1997) and East Coast GRC (from 1997) (born 1939)	12 September 1988	30 April 2008	PAP	Goh II
S. Jayakumar; MP for Bedok GRC (until 1997) and East Coast GRC (from 1997) (born 1939)	12 September 1988	30 April 2008	PAP	Goh III
S. Jayakumar; MP for Bedok GRC (until 1997) and East Coast GRC (from 1997) (born 1939)	12 September 1988	30 April 2008	PAP	Goh IV
S. Jayakumar; MP for Bedok GRC (until 1997) and East Coast GRC (from 1997) (born 1939)	12 September 1988	30 April 2008	PAP	Lee H. I
S. Jayakumar; MP for Bedok GRC (until 1997) and East Coast GRC (from 1997) (born 1939)	12 September 1988	30 April 2008	PAP	Lee H. II
K. Shanmugam; MP for Sembawang GRC (until 2011) and Nee Soon GRC (from 2011) (born 1959)	1 May 2008	23 May 2025	PAP	Lee H. II
K. Shanmugam; MP for Sembawang GRC (until 2011) and Nee Soon GRC (from 2011) (born 1959)	1 May 2008	23 May 2025	PAP	Lee H. III
K. Shanmugam; MP for Sembawang GRC (until 2011) and Nee Soon GRC (from 2011) (born 1959)	1 May 2008	23 May 2025	PAP	Lee H. IV
K. Shanmugam; MP for Sembawang GRC (until 2011) and Nee Soon GRC (from 2011) (born 1959)	1 May 2008	23 May 2025	PAP	Lee H. V
K. Shanmugam; MP for Sembawang GRC (until 2011) and Nee Soon GRC (from 2011) (born 1959)	1 May 2008	23 May 2025	PAP	Wong I
Edwin Tong; MP for East Coast GRC (born 1969)	23 May 2025	Incumbent	PAP	Wong II

== See also ==
- Justice ministry
- Politics of Singapore
