= Simon Chesterman =

Australian legal academic (born 1972)

Simon Chesterman PPA(P)
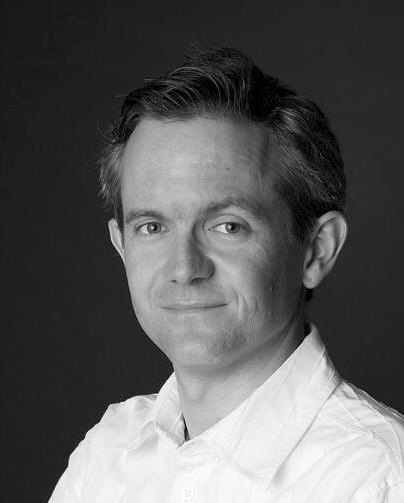
- Born: 1972 (age 53–54); Melbourne, Australia
- Education: University of Melbourne (BA, LLB); Magdalen College, Oxford (DPhil); Beijing International Studies University
- Employer: National University of Singapore
- Notable work: We, the Robots? (2021); One Nation Under Surveillance (2011); Law and Practice of the United Nations (with Thomas M. Franck and David M. Malone, 2008); You, The People (2004); Just War or Just Peace? (2001)
- Spouse: Patricia Tan Shu Ming
- Relatives: Tony Tan Keng Yam (father-in-law)
- Website: www.simonchesterman.com

Simon Chesterman PPA(P) (born 1972) is an Australian legal academic and writer who is currently Vice Provost (Educational Innovation) at the National University of Singapore and the founding Dean of NUS College. He was the dean of NUS Faculty of Law from 2012 to 2022. He was also senior director of AI governance at AI Singapore, editor of the Asian Journal of International Law and co-president of the Law Schools Global League.

A Rhodes Scholar, Chesterman succeeded Tan Cheng Han as Dean of the NUS Faculty of Law on 1 January 2012. Prior to January 2012, he was global professor and director of the New York University School of Law Singapore programme. His research concerns international law, public authority, data protection, and the regulation of artificial intelligence. He is critical of what he sees as the changing and increasingly expanding role of intelligence agencies. Chesterman is the author or editor of twenty books and four novels.

In 2013, Chesterman was appointed as a member of Singapore's Data Protection Advisory Committee, and in 2016 joined the United Nations University Council. From 2012 to 2017, he served as secretary-general of the Asian Society of International Law.

== Early life and education ==
Chesterman was born in Melbourne, Australia and attended Camberwell Grammar School. He graduated with first class honours in arts and law from the University of Melbourne, where he won the Supreme Court Prize as the top student, and was editor of the Melbourne University Law Review. He obtained a Rhodes Scholarship and completed his doctorate in international law at the University of Oxford under the supervision of the late Sir Ian Brownlie. He also holds a diploma in Chinese language from the Beijing International Studies University. Chesterman's play "Everything Before the 'But' Is a Lie" was performed at Oxford's Burton Taylor Studio in 2000. It was directed by Rosamund Pike, who was then an undergraduate student at Oxford.

== Career ==
Chesterman is a founding editor of the Asian Journal of International Law, published from 2011 by Cambridge University Press. He is on the editorial boards of other journals including Global Governance, Journal of Intervention and Statebuilding, Security Dialogue, and The Hague Journal on the Rule of Law.

As Dean of NUS Law, Chesterman oversaw the first review of its curriculum in more than a decade. Changes introduced included greater exposure to the legal systems of Asia and a grade-free first semester.

Chesterman also launched a research agenda. This entailed the creation of a series of new centres: the Centre for Asian Legal Studies, the EW Barker Centre for Law & Business, the Centre for Banking & Finance Law, the Centre for Maritime Law, the Centre for Legal Theory, and the Centre for Technology, Robotics, Artificial Intelligence & the Law. This was said to be aimed at making Singapore a "thought leader" in legal research.

Fundraising efforts included support from Singapore's Ministry of Law for the new research centres, as well as $21m to name the Centre for Law & Business after former Law Minister Edmund W. Barker. Four new endowed chairs were established: the Sat Pal Khattar Chair in Tax Law, the Amaladass Chair in Criminal Justice, the MPA Chair in Maritime Law, and the Saw Swee Hock Centennial Professorship.

A push to increase experiential learning and ethics included the introduction of a mandatory pro bono scheme in 2014 and the creation of a Centre for Pro Bono & Clinical Legal Education in 2017.

In September 2013, NUS Law convened the first ever Global Law Deans' Forum of the International Association of Law Schools. The meeting adopted the Singapore Declaration on Global Standards and Outcomes of a Legal Education, which was intended to offer a "common language" for global legal education.

Under Chesterman's leadership, NUS Law rose from 22nd in the QS World Rankings in 2013 to 10th in 2021, in the process overtaking Hong Kong University's faculty of law to become the top-ranked law school in Asia.

Chesterman was appointed as dean of NUS Law for a fourth term in 2021, and will serve until 30 June 2023, after Professor Hans Tjio, who was appointed to be the next dean in July 2021, relinquished the position for medical reasons. In the same year, he launched an initiative to increase diversity in the law school by shortlisting top students from all of Singapore's schools and increasing the technology component of the curriculum.

== Research ==
=== Humanitarian intervention ===
His doctoral thesis as a Rhodes Scholar, became one of his first books, Just War or Just Peace? Humanitarian Intervention and International Law. Before publication as a book, the work had originally won a 2000 Dasturzada Dr Jal Pavry Memorial Prize for "best thesis in international relations". One review article of this book by Nico Krisch in the European Journal of International Law described Chesterman's book as being pessimistic about humanitarian intervention, when compared to his contemporary Nicholas J. Wheeler who is more optimistic about establishing an international framework for "ideal humanitarian intervention".

Chesterman does not believe that "ideal humanitarian intervention" exists; according to Krisch, he instead belongs to the school of thought that argues that states should "justify their action based on political arguments" rather than relying on a "[humanitarian] recognition of exception to the use of force". Though the intervention would go against international law, it would be in Chesterman's words, a "venial sin". As Krisch analyses, Wheeler also raises "plausible" opposition to this – it would create a "perception" that "powerful states" could ignore international law whenever they wished, pushing other countries to treat international law "equally cavalierly". Noting Chesterman's position, Krisch writes, "law loses much of its weight if its deviation from moral standards is openly admitted and other ways of justification are recognised." Chesterman further argues in Just War or Just Peace that the enforcement of the Iraqi no-fly zones and the Operation Deny Flight (the no-fly zone in Kosovo) went outside the framework of the United Nations, but Krisch calls this claim "overstated". Nevertheless, the book received an American Society of International Law Certificate of Merit.

In Just War or Just Peace, Chesterman rejects the idea that the Federal Republic of Yugoslavia (FRY)'s repression of the Kosovars represented a "supreme humanitarian emergency". Instead, as Nicholas Wheeler notes, Chesterman is "sympathetic" to Russia's historical argument before the Security Council (SC) "that the crisis did not merit an armed response". Going against the widely accepted view is that Russia's threat to use its UN Security Council veto against UN intervention in Kosovo was an act of "mere contrariness" to NATO, Chesterman instead argues NATO "never seriously contemplated that there might be genuine objections to the policies of NATO member states in their dealings with [the FRY]." Chesterman and his allies, Wheeler writes, would actually believe that Russia's official SC position matched its actual belief on the matter; to Chesterman, Russia would have changed its position had the situation "worsened along the apocalyptic lines predicted by NATO governments".

Nevertheless, writing in the journal International Affairs, Wheeler concluded that "Chesterman has written a tour de force that exposes the weaknesses of the arguments supporting a doctrine of unilateral humanitarian intervention in international society ... Chesterman rejects the claim that states have a legal right to act as vigilantes in support of Council resolutions, even if they believe that this is the only means to stop a genocide. The powerfully argued thesis of this scholarly work is that accepting this proposition in law is 'a recipe for bad policy, bad law, and a bad international order'."

As a Modern Law Review article noted, Chesterman condemned NATO's intervention in the Kosovo War as being "completely outside the United Nations system of security and a threat to global stability". He later drew parallels between Kosovo and the arguments raised by Russia for its 2014 annexation of Crimea.

=== State-building ===
Chesterman's book You, The People: The United Nations, Transitional Administration, and State-Building (Oxford University Press, 2004), studies the foundation of new institutions in war-torn regions such as the former Yugoslavia and southeast Asia. Noting Chesterman's intent to highlight the mutually related yet sometimes mutually opposing "ends of liberal democracy and the means of benevolent autocracy," a review article in the George Washington International Law Review called it a "misdelivered message". It was reviewed positively in the New York Review of Books by Brian Urquhart who wrote that "the weight of the subject and the depth of the research are supported by wit, candor, brevity, and analytical writing of a very high order." Another review in Human Rights Quarterly stated that the book "speaks with the authority of a major global commission study and offers analyses and prescriptions with important implications for human rights scholars and practitioners."

=== Intelligence agencies ===
Chesterman has written on the regulation and oversight of intelligence services, including a monograph published by Australia's Lowy Institute for International Policy in 2016. In an opinion piece published in the global edition of The New York Times in November 2009, he argued for limits to the outsourcing of intelligence activities to private contractors such as Blackwater.

Oxford University Press published Chesterman's twelfth book in March 2011. Entitled One Nation Under Surveillance: A New Social Contract to Defend Freedom Without Sacrificing Liberty, it examines what limits – if any – should be placed on a government's efforts to spy on its citizens in the name of national security. Writing in the New York Review of Books, David D. Cole said that Chesterman "argues convincingly that the specter of catastrophic terrorist attacks creates extraordinary pressure for intrusive monitoring; that technological advances have made the collection and analysis of vast amounts of previously private information entirely feasible; and that in a culture transformed by social media, in which citizens are increasingly willing to broadcast their innermost thoughts and acts, privacy may already be as outmoded as chivalry."

=== Data protection and artificial intelligence ===
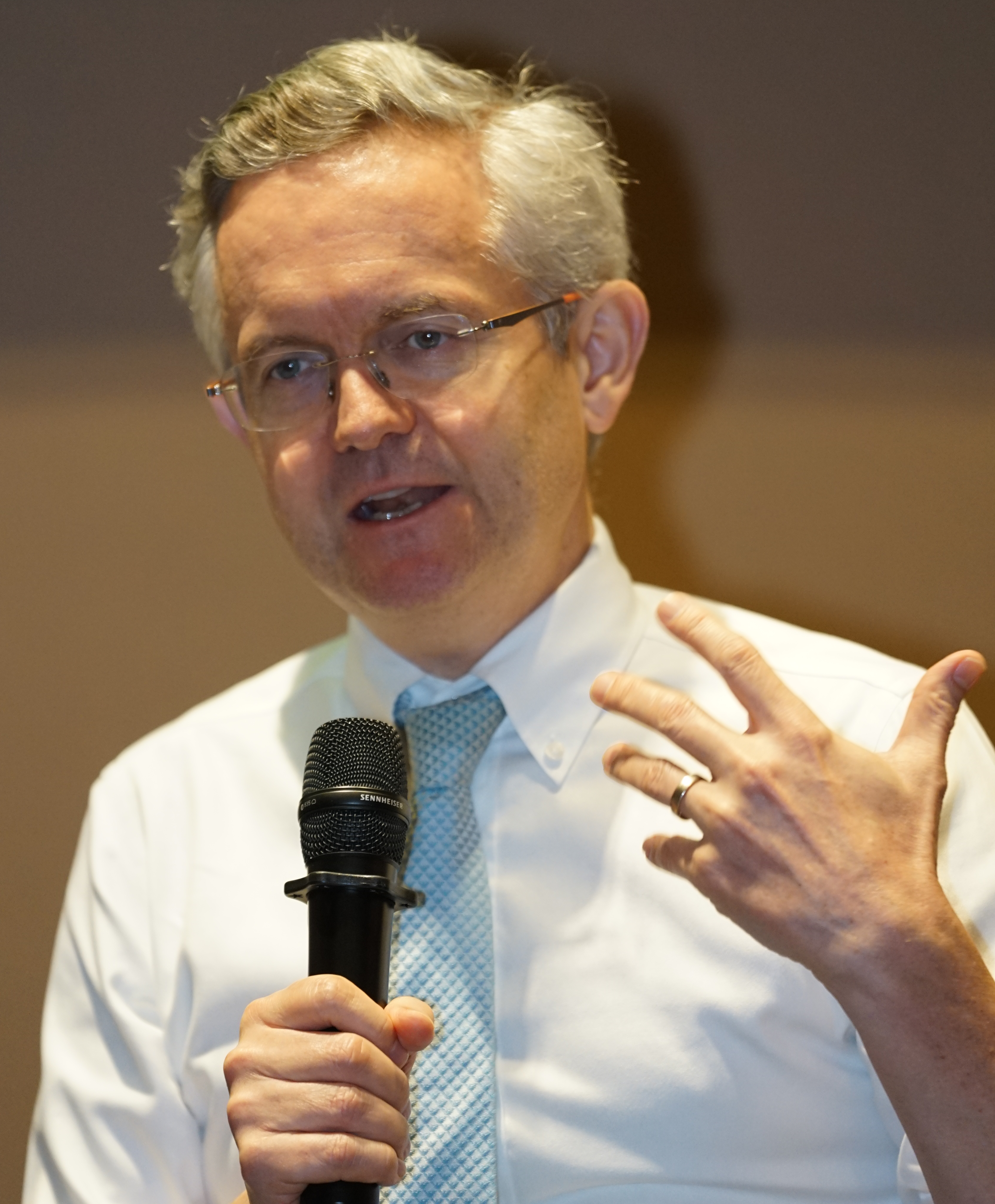
Chesterman at AAAI 2026

In January 2014, Chesterman published an edited volume entitled Data Protection Law in Singapore: Privacy and Sovereignty in an Interconnected World (Singapore: Academy Publishing, 2014).

He is also the author of We, the Robots? Regulating Artificial Intelligence and the Limits of the Law (Cambridge: Cambridge University Press, 2021).

=== Reports ===
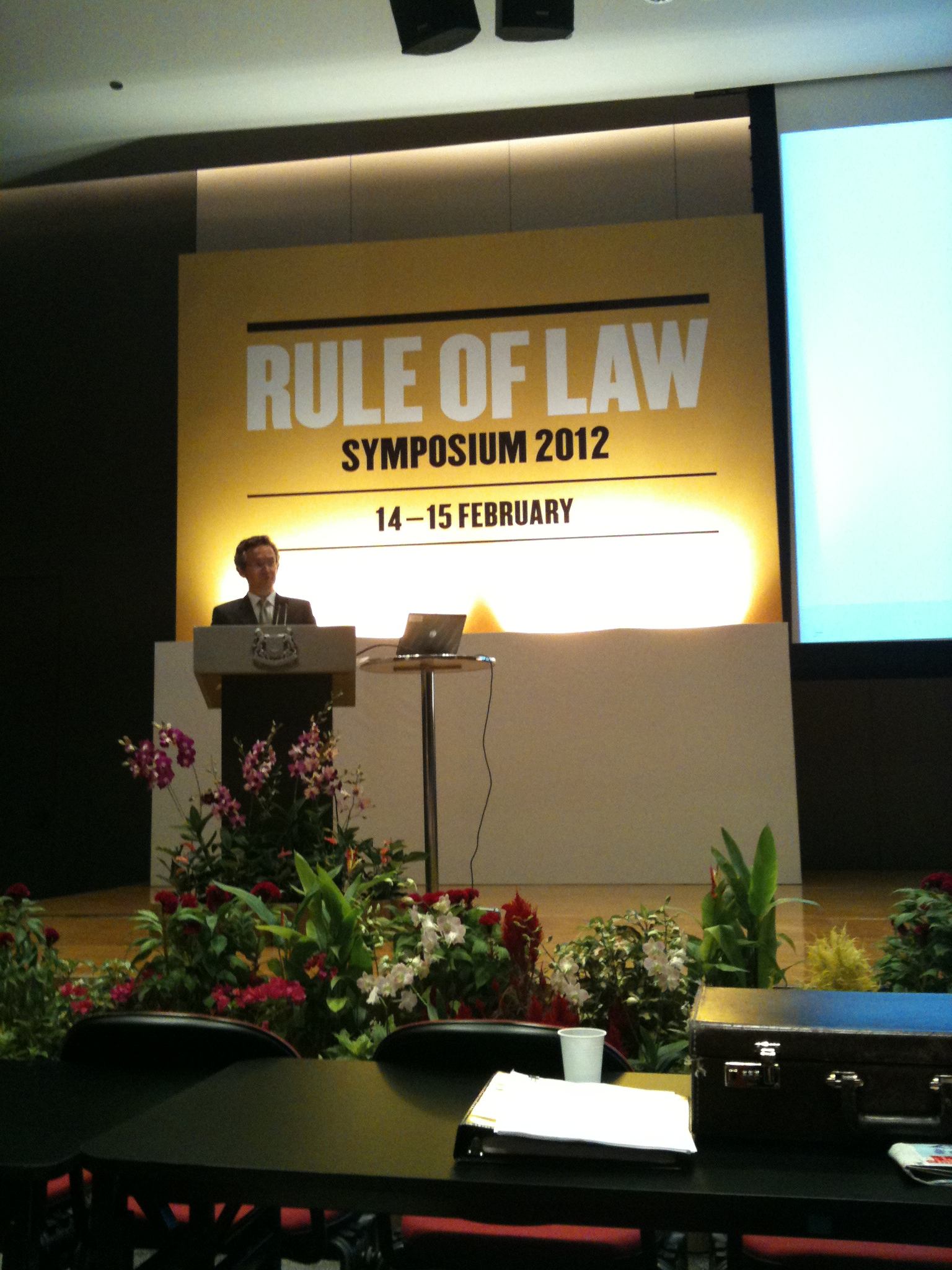
Chesterman speaking at the Rule of Law Symposium 2012 in the Supreme Court Auditorium on 15 February 2012

Chesterman has been author or co-author of various reports for the United Nations, governments, and private bodies. Examples include:

- "The UN Security Council and the Rule of Law", arguing for greater accountability and circulated as a document of the United Nations in all UN languages;
- "Assessment of Implementation of Articles 3 and 4 of the Ethical Guidelines for the Government Pension Fund – Global", reviewing the ethical investment strategy of Norway's sovereign wealth fund and co-authored with the Albright Group founded by former U.S. Secretary of State Madeleine Albright;
- "Asia's Role in Global Governance", a report of the World Economic Forum's Global Redesign Initiative co-authored with Kishore Mahbubani.

=== Other books ===
Other publications have focused on the United Nations, particularly the role of its Secretary-General, and the rise and regulation of private military and security companies.

== Personal life ==
Chesterman is married to Patricia Tan Shu Ming, daughter of former President of Singapore, Tony Tan.

== Bibliography ==
=== Fiction ===
- Raising Arcadia (2016, Marshall Cavendish), 240 pp.
- Finaind Arcadia (2017, Marshall Cavendish), 224 pp.
- Being Arcadia (2018, Marshall Cavendish), 256 pp.
- I, Huckleberry (2020, Marshall Cavendish), 248 pp.

=== Non-fiction ===
- Studying Law at University: Everything You Need to Know (with Clare Rhoden) (Sydney: Allen & Unwin, 1998), 176pp.
- Civilians in War (editor) (Boulder, CO: Lynne Rienner, 2001), 291pp.
- Just War or Just Peace? Humanitarian Intervention and International Law (Oxford: Oxford University Press, 2001), 295pp.
- You, The People: The United Nations, Transitional Administration, and State-Building (Oxford: Oxford University Press, 2004), 296pp.
- Making States Work: State Failure and the Crisis of Governance (editor, with Michael Ignatieff and Ramesh Thakur) (Tokyo: United Nations University Press, 2005), 400pp.
- Studying Law at University (with Clare Rhoden) (2nd edition; Sydney: Allen & Unwin, 1998), 155pp.
- Shared Secrets: Intelligence and Collective Security (Sydney: Lowy Institute for International Policy, 2006), 103pp.
- After Mass Crime: Rebuilding States and Communities (editor, with Béatrice Pouligny and Albrecht Schnabel) (Tokyo: United Nations University Press, 2007), 314pp.
- Secretary or General? The UN Secretary-General in World Politics (editor) (Cambridge: Cambridge University Press, 2007), 280pp.
- From Mercenaries to Market: The Rise and Regulation of Private Military Companies (editor, with Chia Lehnardt) (Oxford: Oxford University Press, 2007), 287pp.
- Law and Practice of the United Nations: Documents and Commentary (with Thomas M. Franck and David M. Malone) (Oxford: Oxford University Press, 2008), 648pp.
- Private Security, Public Order: The Outsourcing of Public Functions and Its Limits (editor, with Angelina Fisher) (Oxford: Oxford University Press, 2009), 247pp.
- One Nation Under Surveillance: A New Social Contract to Defend Freedom Without Sacrificing Liberty (Oxford: Oxford University Press, 2011), 297pp.
- Data Protection Law in Singapore: Privacy and Sovereignty in an Interconnected World (editor) (Singapore: Academy Publishing, 2014), 313pp.
- From Community to Compliance? The Evolution of Monitoring Obligations in ASEAN (Cambridge: Cambridge University Press, 2015), 180pp.
- Law and Practice of the United Nations: Documents and Commentary (with Ian Johnstone and David M. Malone) (2nd edition; Oxford: Oxford University Press, 2016), 736pp.
- Data Protection Law in Singapore: Privacy and Sovereignty in an Interconnected World (2nd edn; Academy Publishing, 2018), 587pp.
- The Oxford Handbook of United Nations Treaties (with David M. Malone and Santiago Villalpando) (Oxford University Press, 2019), 716pp.
- The Oxford Handbook of International Law in Asia and the Pacific (with Hisashi Owada and Ben Saul) (Oxford University Press, 2019), 855pp.
- We, the Robots: Regulating Artificial Intelligence and the Limits of the Law (Cambridge University Press, 2021).

=== Lectures ===
- Asia’s Ambivalence About International Law and Institutions: Past, Present, and Futures in the Lecture Series of the United Nations Audiovisual Library of International Law
