= V. S. Mani =

Indian lawyer and author

Prof. V.S. Mani

Asian Society of International Law President
- In office 2011–2013
- Preceded by: Xue Hanqin

Seedling School of Law and Governance, Jaipur, India Director
- In office 2008–2016

Gujarat National Law University Director
- In office 2003–2008

Government of Nauru Legal Advisor (Office for the Administrative Review of the Detention of Enemy Combatants)
- In office 1985–1990

Personal details
- Born: 6 March 1942 Kerala, India
- Died: 22 August 2016 (aged 74) New Delhi, India
- Citizenship: Indian
- Spouse: Dr. Vathsala Mani
- Children: 2 (Mr S. Venkatesh and Dr.S. Krishnan)
- Occupation: Academician

V. S. Mani (6 March 1942 – 22 August 2016) was an Indian legal scholar. He was the founder and director of Gujarat National Law University and an expert in the field of public international law. He was also the founder and director of the Seedling School of Law and Governance at Jaipur National University in Rajasthan, India. He died on 22 August 2016.

== Other Positions ==
He was also a member of the Advisory Board of the Indian Yearbook of International Law and Policy, Chief Editor, ISIL Yearbook of International Humanitarian Law & Refugee Law, and President of the Asian Society of International Law, Singapore (2011-2013). He was an ex officio member of the Editorial Advisory Board of the Asian Journal of International Law, Singapore.

On 1 September 2013, he was awarded "Professor N.R.Madhava Menon Best Law Teacher 2013" award by Mr. Lalit Bhasin, President of the Indian Law Firms.

== Previous Positions ==
Formerly he was professor at Centre of International Legal Studies, School of International Studies, Jawaharlal Nehru University. He had served as ISRO Chair in International Space Law, as Jawaharlal Nehru Chair in International Environmental Law, and as Director of its Human Rights Teaching and Research Programme. He was also the founder-director of the prestigious Gujarat National Law University, Gandhinagar, India and was elected Executive President of the Indian Society of International Law, New Delhi in 2003. He had been Member, Advisory Committee on drafting of Optional Rules of Arbitration of Space Law Disputes under the auspices of Permanent Court of Arbitration 2010-2011.

== Notable Cases ==
Mani had appeared before the International Court of Justice as agent and counsel on several occasions. He was Legal Advisor and Chief Secretary to the Government of the Republic of Nauru in 1981-83 and again in 1985-90. He was directly involved in organising Nauru’s case against Australia before the International Court of Justice (1986–93). He was a member of the Indian legal team to the ICJ led by India’s Attorney-General, Soli Sorabjee, in Pakistan’s case against India (the Atlantique case) in 1999-2000. He was involved in the drafting of pleadings in at least four cases before the World Court (including the Nuclear Weapons case of 1996).

== Books and publications ==
He had authored/edited nine books and more than 110 research articles, some published in international journals and books, including one published in a book on Essays in International Law published by the United Nations Office of the Legal Affairs.

=== Books ===
1. Handbook of International Humanitarian Law and South Asia (OUP, New Delhi, 2007), edited, sponsored by the ICRC Delegation, New Delhi.
2. "Humanitarian" Intervention Today (The Hague Academy of International Law, The Hague, Martinus Nijhoff, Leiden/Boston, 2005), Recueil des Cours, 2005, vol. 313, pp. 9–323.
3. India on the Threshold of the 21st Century: Shape of Things to Come (New Delhi: co-ed with S. Bhatt, 1998)
4. Human Rights in India: An Overview (New Delhi: Occasional Paper No. 4, the Institute for the World Congress of Human Rights, 1997)
5. Recent Trends in Space Law and Policy (New Delhi: co-ed with S. Bhatt & V. B. Reddy, 1996)
6. Air Law and Policy in India (New Delhi, co-ed with S. Bhatt & V. B. Reddy, 1994)
7. Basic Principles of Modern International Law: A Study of the United Nations Debates on the Principles of International Law concerning Friendly Relations and Co-operation among States (New Delhi, 1993)
8. The Non-Aligned and the United Nations (New Delhi: co-ed with M. S. Rajan, & C. S. R. Murthy, 1987)
9. International Adjudication: Procedural Aspects (Martinus Nijhoff, The Hague/New Delhi, 1980)
