= Tan Lee Meng =

Singaporean judge

- 陈利明

Senior Judge of the Supreme Court of Singapore
- In office 5 January 2015 – 4 January 2021
- Appointed by: Tony Tan

Judge of the Supreme Court of Singapore
- In office 1 August 1997 – 7 July 2013
- Appointed by: Ong Teng Cheong

Judicial Commissioner of Singapore
- In office 2 February 1997 – 1 August 1997
- Appointed by: Ong Teng Cheong

Personal details
- Born: 7 July 1948 (age 78)
- Education: University of Singapore; University of London

Tan Lee Meng (simplified Chinese: 陈利明; traditional Chinese: 陳利明; pinyin: Chén Lì Míng; born 7 July 1948) is an emeritus professor in the National University of Singapore Faculty of Law. He was first appointed as a Judicial Commissioner on 2 February 1997, and then appointed Judge in August 1997, serving until he reached the mandatory retirement age of 65 on 7 July 2013. He also completed two consecutive three-year terms of service as a Senior Judge of the Supreme Court of Singapore. He returned to the NUS after his time in the judiciary, having made "outstanding contributions to the Supreme Court, the Legal Service and the legal profession." At the time of his appointment, Tan was the first ever academic to be appointed to the Supreme Court and his judgments were said to be "instructive, soundly reasoned, and easy to grasp."

In his time as a Judge of the Supreme Court, he presided over numerous trials including most famously as the judge presiding over the defamation suit between the ex-National Kidney Foundation CEO TT Durai and the Singapore Press Holdings. He was also one of the judges in the Court presiding over the court proceedings pertaining to the disciplinary proceedings against Dr Susan Lim, that resulted in her suspension. He also served as the President of the Industrial Arbitration Court from 2002 to 2007.

Apart from serving as an academic, he is also presently a neutral evaluator and a senior mediator with the Singapore Mediation Centre.

== Early life and education ==
Tan attended the University of Singapore (now the National University of Singapore), and graduated from its Faculty of Law with a Bachelor of Laws (LL.B.) with first class honours in 1972. He subsequently obtained a Master of Laws (LL.M.) from the University of London in 1974, which he obtained with distinction, and was admitted to the Bar as an advocate and solicitor in 1976.

== Career as academic ==
Tan joined the University of Singapore's Faculty of Law in 1972, eventually rising to the position of Dean in 1987 (even before turning 40 years old) and Deputy Vice-Chancellor of the National University of Singapore in 1992. As an academic in the NUS Faculty of Law, he was said to be "a popular member of the Faculty because of his kind and approachable manner and the clarity of his teaching." He was also said to have a photographic memory and in his capacity as Dean, "recruited many local teachers for the faculty". In that capacity, Tan invited Tan Cheng Han, a subsequent dean, to consider pursuing academia at the NUS Law Faculty, when the latter was a final year law student.

From 1980 to 1997, he also served as Master of Raffles Hall, staying on campus with students of the National University of Singapore hostel..

When he was appointed to the Supreme Court, initially for a six month stint, it was said that such an appointment of academics would "enable the academics to acquire practical experience of the way in which the Supreme Court works."

Tan is the author of the books The Law in Singapore on Carriage of Goods by Sea (1986) (described recently as a "highly original enterprise") and Insurance Law in Singapore (1988), and various law journal articles. His books have been hailed by commentators with one commentary noting, while reviewing The Law in Singapore on Carriage of Goods by Sea, that "Singapore is indeed fortunate to have so authoritative an exposition of a major branch of its law".

== Selected works ==
=== Articles ===
- "Insurance Agents and the Proposal Form", Malaya Law Review, 17: 104–116, 1975.
- "Insurance Warranties: Some Criticisms and Proposals for Reform", Malaya Law Review, 21: 258–265, 1979.
- "The Shipowner's Right to Withdraw His Vessel upon Non-payment of Hire", Malaya Law Review, 22: 20–28, 1980.
- "The Carriage of Goods by Sea Act 1972 and the Hamburg Rules", Malaya Law Review, 22: 199–212, 1980.
- "Insurable Interest in Life Policies", Malaya Law Review, 23: 137–146, 1981.

=== Books ===
- The Law in Singapore on Carriage of Goods by Sea, Singapore: Malayan Law Journal, 1986, ISBN 9789971700492. Later editions:
  - The Law in Singapore on Carriage of Goods by Sea (2nd ed.), Singapore: Butterworths Asia, 1994, ISBN 978-0-409-99701-9.
  - The Law in Singapore on Carriage of Goods by Sea (3rd ed.), Singapore: Wildy & Sons Ltd, 2018, ISBN 9780198811947.
- Insurance Law in Singapore, Singapore: Butterworths, 1988, ISBN 978-0-409-99566-4.
  - Insurance Law in Singapore (2nd ed.), Singapore: Butterworths, 1997
  - Insurance Law in Singapore (3rd ed.), Singapore: Academy Publishing, 2025
