= Lionel Astor Sheridan =

English educator and academic (1927–2025)

Lionel Astor "Lee" Sheridan (21 July 1927 – 24 July 2025) was an English educator and academic who served as the first Dean of the Faculty of Law at the University of Malaya, and its successor universities, in Singapore. He has been considered the "Father of Legal Education in Malaya".

== Early life and education ==
Lionel Astor Sheridan was born on 21 July 1927 in Croydon, Surrey, to Stanley Frederick Sheridan and Anne Quednan. He was educated at Whitgift School, and had at seventeen planned to enter Pembroke College, Cambridge, and study English and French literature. However, he changed his mind and began studying for a Bachelor of Laws degree at the University of London instead, graduating in 1947. In the next year, he was called to the bar.

After being called to the bar, he planned to study for a PhD at the University of London, and began teaching part-time as an Assistant Lecturer at the University of Nottingham to cover tuition costs. In 1949, he was given a lectureship at Queen's University Belfast and subsequently transferred his doctoral candidacy there. At Queen's, his doctoral supervisor was J. L. Montrose.

Sheridan's doctoral thesis, 'Fraud in Equity', was published and received some amount of critical acclaim.

== Academic career ==
In July 1956, Sheridan and his family arrived in Singapore, and he immediately set about his task of creating a Faculty of Law at the University of Malaya, as recommended by Roland Braddell and R. G. D. Allen in a report commissioned by the university. Sheridan's first lecture was on 19 October 1956.

As Dean of the new faculty, Sheridan set about hiring a wide range of academic staff, and the early faculty included:

- Chua Boon Lan, a Singaporean lawyer who served as Sheridan's "principal assistant"
- Alice Tay, future professor at the University of Sydney
- John Tan Chor Yong
- Harry Wee
- David Marshall, former Chief Minister of Singapore
- Edmund W. Barker, former Minister of Law
- Tan Boon Teik, former Attorney-General of Singapore
- Punch Coomaraswamy, later a judge on the Supreme Court of Singapore
- Bernard Brown, future professor at the University of Auckland

Following the creation of an academic staff, Sheridan's first graduating class was in 1961. Despite his English background, Sheridan believed it was necessary to design the course so it was relevant to the local culture, and in 1960 stated that "success has been achieved in introducing a syllabus adapted to Malayan needs". He ensured that only English legal history which was relevant to Malayan law would be covered in classes, and focused on local customary law within his own work.

Sheridan's views on education differed from those that were mainstream at the time: he began teaching the Socratic method to his students, and argued that "examinations should test ability to argue from available legal materials and not the ability to remember what materials are available". Alongside this was Sheridan's insistence that students learn the philosophical premises of the law, with a mandatory reading of legal theory and philosophy.

=== The law library ===
As early as 1957, Sheridan had set about creating a law library for the newly formed faculty to use. A report published by Sheridan in that year stated "we have almost a complete library of Malayan law though lacking some of the more ancient reports". He began subscribing to a range of periodicals from around the world, and made use of local lawyers and experts to source materials for the library.

=== University of Malaya Law Review ===
As a way of spreading legal information throughout Singapore, he created the University of Malaya Law Review journal (later the Malaya Law Review and now the Singapore Journal of Legal Studies) in 1960. He had hoped the journal would become "important all over the world", and called its creation his "proudest achievement". Sheridan had retired as editor of the journal by its third volume, and was succeeded by Geoffrey Wilson Bartholomew.

== Later career ==
In May 1963, Sheridan left Singapore and returned to Belfast and became Professor of Comparative Laws at Queen's. In June 1963, the newly formed University of Singapore conferred on him an honorary Doctor of Laws degree.

He was instrumental in the creation of the Law Faculty at University College Cardiff. In March 1987, he became acting principal of the college, following C. W. L. Bevan's pre-retirement sabbatical leave. During this period, the college was facing high levels of debt and Sheridan was left to attempt to solve the issue by asking staff for short-term loans.

== Personal life and death ==
On 1 June 1948, Sheridan married Margaret Helen Béghin: in 1984 they had a daughter (Linda Anne) and a son (Peter Louis). Margaret assisted him in entertaining staff and students, and also edited parts of his work.

Sheridan died on 24 July 2025, at the age of 98.

== Selected works ==
Andrew Phang refers to over 170 works published by Sheridan, of which the following are a selection:

=== Books ===
| Title | Time of first publication | First edition publisher/publication | Unique identifier | Notes |
|---|---|---|---|---|
| Elementary Law - An Introduction for the Malayan Citizen | 1957 | | OCLC 9203351 | Co-written with Tan Boon Teik |
| The Cy-Près Doctrine | 1959 | Sweet & Maxwell | OCLC 10722807 | Co-written with V. T. H. Delany |
| Malaya and Singapore, The Borneo Territories, The Development of their Laws and Constitutions | 1961 | Stevens & Sons | OCLC 971389006 | |
| The Modern Law of Charities | 1992 | Barry Rose | OCLC 27144375 | Co-edited with George W. Keeton |

=== Articles ===
| Title | Time of publication | Publication | Unique identifier | Notes |
|---|---|---|---|---|
| "Federation of Malaya Constitution" | 1959 | University of Malaya Law Review | JSTOR 24874705 | |
| "The Repatriation of the Common Law" | 1965 | Current Legal Problems | | |
