= One Nation Under Surveillance =

2011 book by Simon Chesterman

- Cover of One Nation Under Surveillance
- Author: Simon Chesterman
- Language: English
- Subject: Intelligence; Espionage; National security Privacy
- Publisher: Oxford University Press
- Publication date: 2011
- Media type: Print (Hardcover)
- Pages: 320 pp.
- ISBN: 978-0-19-958037-8

One Nation Under Surveillance: A New Social Contract to Defend Freedom Without Sacrificing Liberty is a book by Simon Chesterman, Dean and Professor at the National University of Singapore Faculty of Law.

Oxford University Press published the book in March 2011. It examines what limits—if any—should be placed on a government's efforts to spy on its citizens in the name of national security.

Advance praise included a quote from former CIA Inspector-General Frederick Hitz:

"This book squarely faces the taboo subject of domestic privacy in an era of Islamist terrorism. Our enemies are not nation-states, so the targets of the intelligence services seeking to pre-empt terrorist attacks must be individuals. The casualty will be individual privacy. People will struggle against heightened surveillance, Chesterman notes, 'but the war will be lost.'"

Gareth Evans, president emeritus of Crisis Group and former Foreign Affairs Minister of Australia has written:

"This is an important book, breaking new ground in the sweep of its analysis, its analytical insights, and the policy implications it draws out. It shows just how often foreign and domestic intelligence gathering in the major democracies has been insensitive to public accountability, legality, and its consequences for individuals, to the detriment of both liberty and security—and how this can and must change. Simon Chesterman writes, as always, with compelling clarity and authority."

Writing in the New York Review of Books, David D. Cole observed that Chesterman

"argues convincingly that the specter of catastrophic terrorist attacks creates extraordinary pressure for intrusive monitoring; that technological advances have made the collection and analysis of vast amounts of previously private information entirely feasible; and that in a culture transformed by social media, in which citizens are increasingly willing to broadcast their innermost thoughts and acts, privacy may already be as outmoded as chivalry."
