= Razer Phone =

Android-based phablet from Razer

- Brand: Razer Inc.
- Type: Phablet
- First released: November 15, 2017; 8 years ago
- Availability by region: November 15, 2017: United States; United Kingdom; Canada
- Units sold: Unknown
- Units shipped: Unknown
- Predecessor: Nextbit Robin (indirect)
- Successor: Razer Phone 2
- Compatible networks: Global GSM
- Form factor: Slate
- Dimensions: 158.5 mm (6.24 in) H 77.7 mm (3.06 in) W 8 mm (0.31 in) D
- Weight: 198 g (7.0 oz)
- Operating system: Android 7.1 "Nougat" (upgradable to 9 "Pie")
- System-on-chip: Qualcomm Snapdragon 835
- CPU: Octa-core (4x2.35 GHz & 4x1.9 GHz) Kryo
- GPU: Adreno 540
- Memory: 8 GB LPDDR4X RAM
- Storage: 64 GB
- Removable storage: microSD, up to 2 TB
- Battery: 4,000 mAh Li-ion
- Rear camera: Dual 12 MP + 12 MP (f/1.75, PDAF & f/2.6, PDAF), 2x optical zoom, dual-LED flash, 4K video
- Front camera: 8 MP, autofocus
- Display: 5.7 in (140 mm) IPS LCD, 2560x1440 resolution, 515 ppi, DCI-P3 wide color gamut, 120 Hz Q-Sync variable refresh rate
- Sound: Dual Dolby Atmos stereo speakers (front-facing)
- Connectivity: 3G, 4G VoLTE, Bluetooth 4.2, NFC, WiFi 802.11a/b/g/n/ac, GPS & GLONASS, USB-C
- Data inputs: Fingerprint scanner (side-mounted), Accelerometer, gyroscope, proximity sensor, electronic compass
- Model: RZ35-0215
- Codename: cheryl
- Website: www.razerzone.com/mobile/razer-phone

The Razer Phone (code name: cheryl, stylized as RΛZΞR PHONE) is an Android-based phablet designed and developed by Razer Inc., released on November 15, 2017. While the device was designed mainly for mobile gamers, reviewers such as Engadget have noted that it is also good enough for everyday use.

== History ==
As a result of Razer's acquisition of Nextbit in January 2017, Razer started developing its own phone. The Razer Phone, therefore, is very similar in design to the Nextbit Robin. Its fingerprint scanner and front camera's positioning is the same, and both phones have large bezels, although the Razer Phone is made of aluminum, unlike the plastic Robin.

In October 2018, Razer announced the Razer Phone 2 with numerous enhancements from the Razer Phone, such as improved screen and camera, wireless charging, and Razer Chroma lighting.

In February 2019, Razer confirmed that it had let 30 employees go and was shutting down several projects. It is assumed the Razer Phone 3 was among those projects canceled. Razer did confirm that it would continue to sell the Razer Phone 2 and that it remains committed to supporting the phone with the latest updates and features.

== Specifications ==
=== Hardware ===
The Razer Phone's back is made of black aluminum with a chrome Razer logo. Special editions were released, one with a gold logo, and one with a green logo. The front glass is protected by Corning Gorilla Glass 3. The volume buttons are made of aluminum, and the power buttons are made of plastic.

It uses the Qualcomm Snapdragon 835 SoC, coupled with 8 GB LPDDR4X RAM and 64 GB internal storage. The internal storage is expandable by a microSD card.

The display is a 5.7" 1440p IPS LCD panel with a 16:9 aspect ratio. Its highlighted feature is an "UltraMotion" 120 Hz display with Qualcomm's Q-Sync variable refresh rate, similar to Apple's second-generation iPad Pro. The quick refresh rate allows for gamers to play with almost zero latency.

The phone comes with two 12 MP cameras on the back, one wide-angle and one telephoto. The wide-angle lens features an f/1.75 aperture, while the telephoto lens offers f/2.6 aperture.

It uses the USB-C charging port for its 4,000 mAh battery; capable of fast charging using Qualcomm Quick Charge 4+. It also has a 24W fast charger included in the box. The phone does not have a 3.5 mm headphone jack. The speakers are enhanced with Dolby Atmos, and the phone comes with a THX-certified USB-C to 3.5 mm headphone jack adapter.

=== Software ===
On release, the phone ran near-stock Android 7.1 Nougat. On April 16, 2018, the phone was upgraded to Android 8.1 Oreo. Its default launcher is Nova Launcher Prime. Razer CEO Min-Liang Tan confirmed to a user on Twitter that the Razer Phone would get Android Pie in 2019.

== Accessories ==
=== Project Linda ===
At CES 2018, Razer previewed a prototype laptop codenamed "Project Linda" that uses the Razer Phone to power the computer. After the phone is placed into the touchpad area of the computer and a hardware button is pressed, a USB-C connector clicks into the phone, which also charges the phone when docked.

The laptop uses a custom operating system based on Android and has 200 GB of internal storage, a 13.3" 1440p display, two USB ports, a 720p webcam, a dual-array microphone, and a 3.5mm headphone jack, but lacks dedicated speakers and uses those built into the Razer Phone.

Preceded by Nextbit Robin	Razer Phone; 2017	Succeeded by Razer Phone 2
