= Antony Anghie =

Australian university teacher

- Education: Monash University; Harvard Law School; Harvard Center for International Affairs
- Occupation: Teacher

Antony T. Anghie is a law professor at the National University of Singapore Faculty of Law and Secretary-General of the Asian Society of International Law. He was previously the Samuel D. Thurman Professor at S. J. Quinney College of Law, University of Utah and continues to serve as Professor at the College of Law. He has been visiting professor at numerous schools including the American University Cairo, Cornell Law School, the London School of Economics, Harvard Law School, the University of Brasilia, and the University of Cambridge.

He is also a member of the Institut de Droit International, whose membership comprises the world's leading public international lawyers.

Anghie is a leading scholar in the Third World Approaches to International Law movement.

== Career ==
Anghie obtained a BA (Hons) in English and Politics and LLB (Hons) in Law at Monash University. He qualified as a Barrister and Solicitor of the Supreme Court of Victoria and practiced law in Melbourne, Australia. He then received his S.J.D. from Harvard Law School, where he served as a MacArthur Scholar at the Harvard Center for International Affairs and a Senior Fellow in the Graduate Program. He was an intern for the International Monetary Fund in Washington, D.C.

Anghie worked as a research assistant for C.G. Weeramantry, who was then Chief Commissioner of an Inquiry established to examine the history of phosphate mining on the island of Nauru. It was through this experience that Anghie reflected on the relationship between colonialism and international law, that eventually culminated in his highly influential book Imperialism, Sovereignty and International Law.

He joined the faculty at the S. J. Quinney College of Law, University of Utah in 1995. At the Centre for International Law based at the National University of Singapore, he heads the Teaching and Researching International Law in Asia team, which focuses on developing resources and a research culture amongst international law scholars in Asia.

In 2023 he received the Manley O. Hudson Medal of the American Society of International Law, its highest honor.

== Key ideas ==
In Imperialism, Sovereignty, and the Making of International Law (2005), Anghie argues, among other things, that "colonialism was central to the constitution of international law and sovereignty doctrine". In the course of making this argument, he develops his concept of the 'dynamic of difference' and argues that it is central to the civilizing mission of imperial projects. He writes:

[The civilizing mission] furthered itself by postulating an essential difference - what might be termed a 'cultural difference' - between Europeans and non-Europeans, the Spanish and the Indians, the civilized and the uncivilized. This basic distinction has been reproduced, in a supposedly non-imperial world, in the distinctions that play such a decisive role in contemporary international relations: the divisions between the developed and the developing, the pre-modern and the post-modern and now, once again, the civilized and the barbaric. My argument is that the 'civilizing mission', the maintenance of this dichotomy - variously understood in different phases of the history of international law - combined with the task of bridging this gap, provided international law with a dynamic that shaped the character of sovereignty - and more broadly, of international law and institutions.

In other words, the 'dynamic of difference' posits a difference between two entities (e.g., two nations), declares the condition of one of these entities to be superior to that of the other, and then develops practices aimed at transforming the condition of this other to the condition of the superior entity - thereby collapsing the initially posited difference. For example, through this concept, development science, policy and discourse may be viewed as justified on the basis of a posited difference between 'developed' and 'developing' states along with the supposed superiority of the condition of being 'developed'. Although Anghie does not give it as an example of the dynamic of difference, the same can be said about state-building discourses, which posit a difference between 'successful' and 'failed' states in order to justify the science and practice of state-building, which supposedly rehabilitates the states labelled as 'failed'.

In October 2023, he signed an open letter to United States President Joe Biden condemning Israel’s bombardment and intensifying blockade of the Gaza Strip. The letter was signed by 178 legal scholars from some of the US’s most prestigious law faculties. In this letter, Israeli military action was called ‘a moral catastrophe’.
