= Raising Arcadia =

2016 novel by Simon Chesterman

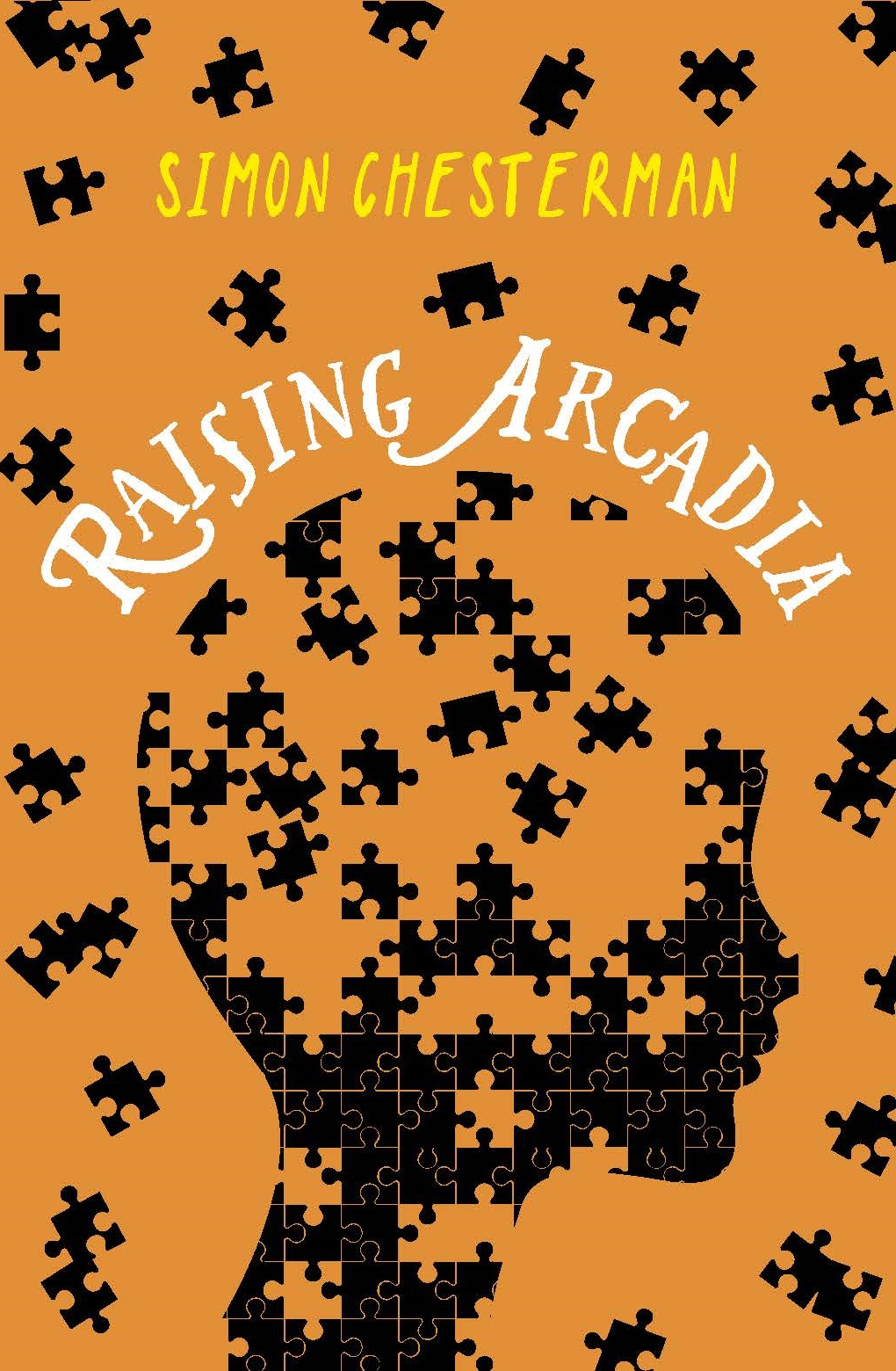
- Author: Simon Chesterman
- Language: English
- Publisher: Marshall Cavendish
- Publication date: 2016
- Media type: Print (paperback)
- Pages: 240 pp.
- ISBN: 9789814751506
- Website: www.raisingarcadia.com

Raising Arcadia is a novel by Simon Chesterman, Dean and Professor at the National University of Singapore Faculty of Law.

Published in May 2016, the book is the first in a trilogy. A sequel, Finding Arcadia, was published in November 2016 and launched at the Singapore Writers Festival. The third and final book in the trilogy, Being Arcadia, was published in 2018 and shortlisted for the Singapore Book Awards.

== Overview ==
The central character, Arcadia Greentree, is a sixteen-year-old savant, described as “aware of her surroundings in a way that sometimes gets her into trouble — and out of it again”.

== Reception ==
Kirkus Reviews describes the book as a young adult mystery paying tribute to Sherlock Holmes. “Though overstuffed with obscure allusions and unnecessary infodumps, this series opener is pleasurably packed with clever, solvable, well-explained puzzles; hits the spot for a mystery lover.”

The School Library Journal places it in the tradition of English boarding school novels. “Fans of quirky protagonists, puzzling mysteries, and spy craft will enjoy this. A solid addition to any middle school, high school, or public library.”

Glee Books rated it “highly recommended, especially for those who enjoyed the pacy intrigue and thrills of The Mysterious Benedict Society mysteries.

== Awards ==
Raising Arcadia was shortlisted for the Popular Readers' Choice Awards at BookFest Singapore 2016.

Being Arcadia, the final book in the trilogy, was shortlisted for the 2018 Singapore Book Awards.
