= David M. Malone =

Canadian author and career diplomat (1954-2025)

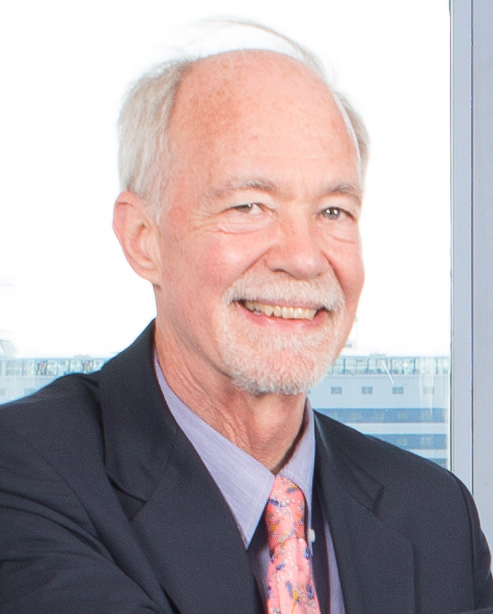
- Malone in 2013

Rector of United Nations University (UNU)
- In office 1 March 2013 – 28 February 2023
- Deputy: Taikan Oki, Senior Vice-Rector, UNU
- Preceded by: Konrad Osterwalder
- Succeeded by: Tshilidzi Marwala

High Commissioner of Canada to India
- In office 2006–2008

Permanent Representative of Canada to the United Nations
- In office 1992–1994

President, International Peace Institute
- In office 1998–2004
- Succeeded by: Terje Rød-Larsen

President, International Development Research Centre
- In office 2008–2013

Personal details
- Born: 7 February 1954 Ottawa, Ontario, Canada
- Died: 24 November 2025 (aged 71) Victoria, British Columbia, Canada

David M. Malone (7 February 1954 – 24 November 2025) was a Canadian author on international security and development, as well as a career diplomat. He was a president of the International Peace Institute, and a frequently quoted expert on international affairs, especially on Indian Foreign Policy and the work of the UN Security Council. He became president of the International Development Research Centre in 2008 and served until 2013. On 1 March 2013, he took up the position of UN Under-Secretary-General, Rector of the United Nations University, which he fulfilled until 28 February 2023.

== Early life and education ==
David Malone was born in Ottawa, Ontario on 7 February 1954. He was bilingual in French and in English and passed the French exam Baccalauréat in Ecole Saint Martin in Pontoise (France).He held a degree from l’École des Hautes Études Commerciales (Montreal); studied at the American University in Cairo; held an MPA from Harvard's Kennedy School of Government; and earned a DPhil in International Relations from Oxford University.

== Career ==
=== Diplomatic career ===
Malone served as a Canadian Ambassador to the UN from 1992 to 1994, after representing Canada on the UN's Economic and Social Council, 1990-92. He was appointed the Canadian High Commissioner to India, and the non-resident Ambassador to Nepal and Bhutan, 2006-2008.

=== International Peace Institute ===
From 1998 until 2004, when Terje Rød-Larsen took over, he was the president of the International Peace Institute, then known as the International Peace Academy. He has spoken at the Carnegie Council for Ethics in International Affairs.

=== International Development Research Centre ===
Malone was president of the International Development Research Centre, a Canadian crown corporation that supports evidence-based and policy relevant research into healthier, more equitable, and more prosperous societies in the global south from 2008 to 2013

=== Haiti ===
Malone had a long-term interest in Haiti, which he visited as part of UN delegations and as a representative of human rights groups. His book Decision-Making in the UN Security Council: The Case of Haiti is "an account of the struggle to address the Haiti crisis from 1990 to 1998." A former supporter of president Jean-Bertrand Aristide, he was highly critical of the international pressure that resulted in Aristide's ousting, singling out the United States, France, and Canada in a 2004 op-ed piece published in the International Herald Tribune and The New York Times. In an interview with the Neue Zürcher Zeitung, he expressed mixed optimism that a lengthy (15 to 20 years) international involvement might bring about positive change, but lamented the lack of interest in "Paris, Washington, or even Ottawa" in a long-term strategy. In an op-ed piece in The New York Times written with Kirsti Samuels (also of the International Peace Institute) published in July 2004, he advocated an international commitment to long-term nation-building for Haiti.

=== India ===
Malone also focused extensively on India's international relations. He wrote a monograph, ‘Does the Elephant Dance? Contemporary Indian Foreign Policy’, Oxford University Press, 2011, and in 2015 co-edited a wide-ranging survey of Indian Foreign Policy, with C. Raja Mohan and Srinath Raghavan, comprising a wide range of essays for Oxford University Press on the same topic primarily written by Indian authors, including many young ones. He was one of the foreign scholars most often cited on India's international relations.

=== United Nations University ===
Malone was appointed by the United Nations Secretary-General Ban Ki-moon as Rector of the United Nations University (UNU) headquartered in Tokyo, Japan, on 3 October 2012. He took up this position on 1 March 2013 and retired from it on 28 February 2023. He published five books during his tenure, including ‘The Oxford Handbook of Higher Education in the Asia-Pacific Region’, co-edited with Devesh Kapur, Lily Kong and Florence Lo, comprising multiple chapters written primarily by authors from the region, published by Oxford University Press in November 2022.

== Authorship ==
Malone has written a number of books, many of them concerned with the United Nations, international development, international security and Indian foreign policy. He frequently published academic chapters and articles in scholarly volumes and journals. He wrote regularly for the Literary Review of Canada. Earlier he had written on the political economy of civil wars, on the causes of violent conflict and conflict prevention, on Security Council decision-making, in Haiti and on Iraq.

Malone's The International Struggle Over Iraq: Politics in the UN Security Council 1980-2005 was nominated for the 2006-2007 Lionel Gelber Prize, an award given annually to the best book on international affairs.

=== Books authored and edited ===
- " The Oxford Handbook of Higher Education in the Asia-Pacific Region", co-edited with Devesh Kapur, Lily Kong and Florence Lo (Oxford UP, 2022)
- " Megaregulation Contested: Global Economic Ordering after TPP, co-edited with Benedict Kingsbury, Paul Mertenskötter, Richard B. Stewart, Thomas Streinz and Atsushi Sunami, (Oxford UP, 2019)
- " The Oxford Handbook of United Nations Treaties", co-edited with Simon Chesterman, Santiago Villalpando, with Alexandra Ivanovic, (Oxford UP, 2019)
- " The Law and Practice of the UN",2nd Ed., co-authored with Simon Chesterman and Ian Jonhstone (Oxford UP, 2016)
- " The Oxford Handbook on Indian Foreign Policy", co-edited with C. Raja Mohan and Srinath Raghavan (Oxford UP, 2015)
- " The UN Security Council in the 21st Century", co-edited with Sebastian von Einsiedel and Bruno Stagno Ugarte, (Lynne Rienner 2014)
- International Development: Ideas, Experience, and Prospects, co-edited with Bruce Currie-Alder, Ravi Kanbur and Rohinton Medhora (Oxford UP, 2014) ISBN 9780199671663
- Nepal in Transition: From Civil War to Fragile Peace, co-edited with Sebastian von Einsiedel and Suman Pradhan (Cambridge UP, 2012)
- Does the Elephant Dance? Contemporary Indian Foreign Policy (Oxford UP, 2011)
- The Law and Practice of the United Nations, co-authored by Simon Chesterman and Thomas M. Franck (Oxford UP, 2008)
- Iraq: Preventing a Future Generation of Conflict, co-edited by Markus Bouillon and Ben Rowswell (Lynne Rienner, 2007)
- The International Struggle Over Iraq: Politics in the UN Security Council, 1980-2005 (Oxford UP, 2006)
- The UN Security Council From Cold War to Twenty-First Century (Lynne Rienner, 2004)
- Unilateralism and US Foreign Policy, co-edited by Yuen Foong Khong (Lynne Rienner, 2002)
- From Reaction to Conflict Prevention, co-edited by Fen Osler Hampson (Lynne Rienner, 2002)
- Greed and Grievance: Economic Agendas in Civil Wars, co-edited by Mats Berdal, (Lynne Rienner, 2000)
- Decision-Making in the UN Security Council: The Case of Haiti (Oxford UP, 1999)

== Personal life and death ==
He was the son of Paul Malone, a journalist and diplomat and Deirdre Lavalette Ingram Malone . Malone died on 24 November 2025, in Victoria, British Columbia, choosing to die via medical assistance after first being diagnosed with prostate cancer and then Alzheimer's disease.
