= Asian Society of International Law =

The Asian Society of International Law (AsianSIL) is a region-wide forum for interaction among scholars and practitioners of public and private international law either based in or interested in Asia. It was established in April 2007 at an inaugural meeting at the National University of Singapore.

== Mandate ==
The Society is an international non-partisan, non-profit, and non-governmental organization with the following objectives:

- To promote research, education and practice of international law by serving as a centre of activities among international law scholars and practitioners in Asia and elsewhere, in a spirit of partnership with other relevant international, regional and national societies and organizations;
- To foster and encourage Asian perspectives of international law; and
- To promote awareness of and respect for international law in Asia.

== Officeholders ==
The first president of the Society (2007–2009) was Hisashi Owada, former President of the International Court of Justice.

The current president of the Society is Borhan Uddin Khan.

S/N	President	Country	Term of office
1.	OWADA Hisashi	Japan	2007–2009
2.	XUE Hanqin	China	2009–2011
3.	V.S. Mani	India	2011–2013
4.	Surakiart Sathirathai	Thailand	2013–2015
5.	PAIK Jin-Hyun	South Korea	2015–2017
6.	Harry Roque (fugitive)	Philippines	2017–2019
7.	Shirley Scott	Australia	2019-2021
8.	Hikmahanto Juwana	Indonesia	2021-2023

|- |9. || Borhan Uddin Khan|| Bangladesh || 2025-Present |}

The current Secretary-General of the Society is Antony Anghie.

S/N	Secretary-General	Country	Term of office
1.	Tan Cheng Han	Singapore	2007–2011
2.	Simon Chesterman	Australia	2012–2017
3.	Antony Anghie	Sri Lanka	2017-

== Publications ==
In 2011, the Society launched its official journal, the Asian Journal of International Law, published by Cambridge University Press.

== Biennial Meetings ==
The Society organizes major conferences every two years. Meetings have thus far been held in:

- Singapore (2007)
- Tokyo (2009)
- Beijing (2011)
- New Delhi (2013)
- Bangkok (2015)
- Seoul (2017)
- Manila (2019)
- Canberra (to take place in 2021)
