= Asian Journal of International Law =

- Discipline: International law
- Language: English
- Edited by: Antony Anghie, Simon Chesterman, Tan Hsien-Li

Publication details
- Former name: Singapore Year Book of International Law
- History: 2011–present
- Publisher: Cambridge University Press
- Frequency: Biannually

Standard abbreviations
- ISO 4: Asian J. Int. Law

Indexing
- ISSN: 2044-2513

Links
- Journal homepage

The Asian Journal of International Law is a peer-reviewed law review focusing on public and private international law. It is an official publication of the Asian Society of International Law and is published by Cambridge University Press. It is produced by the National University of Singapore Faculty of Law and succeeds the Singapore Year Book of International Law. The editors-in-chief are Antony Anghie, Simon Chesterman, and Tan Hsien-Li.

The first issue, published in January 2011, included articles by leading Asian scholars and practitioners such as Hisashi Owada, Xue Hanqin, B. S. Chimni, Tommy Koh, Onuma Yasuaki, and Michael Hwang.

The launch of the Journal was welcomed as, perhaps, exemplifying a newly assertive Asia challenging the West in intellectual as well as economic terms.

The journal is abstracted and indexed in Scopus.

== See also ==
- American Journal of International Law
- European Journal of International Law
