= Nextbit Robin =

Cloud-based smartphone by Nextbit

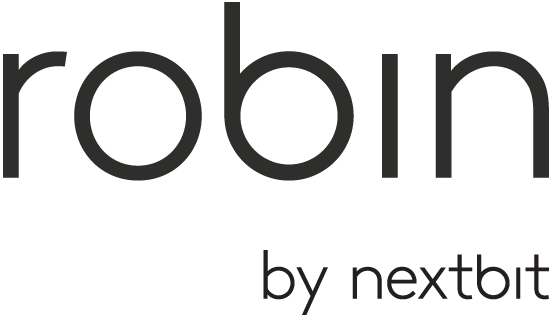

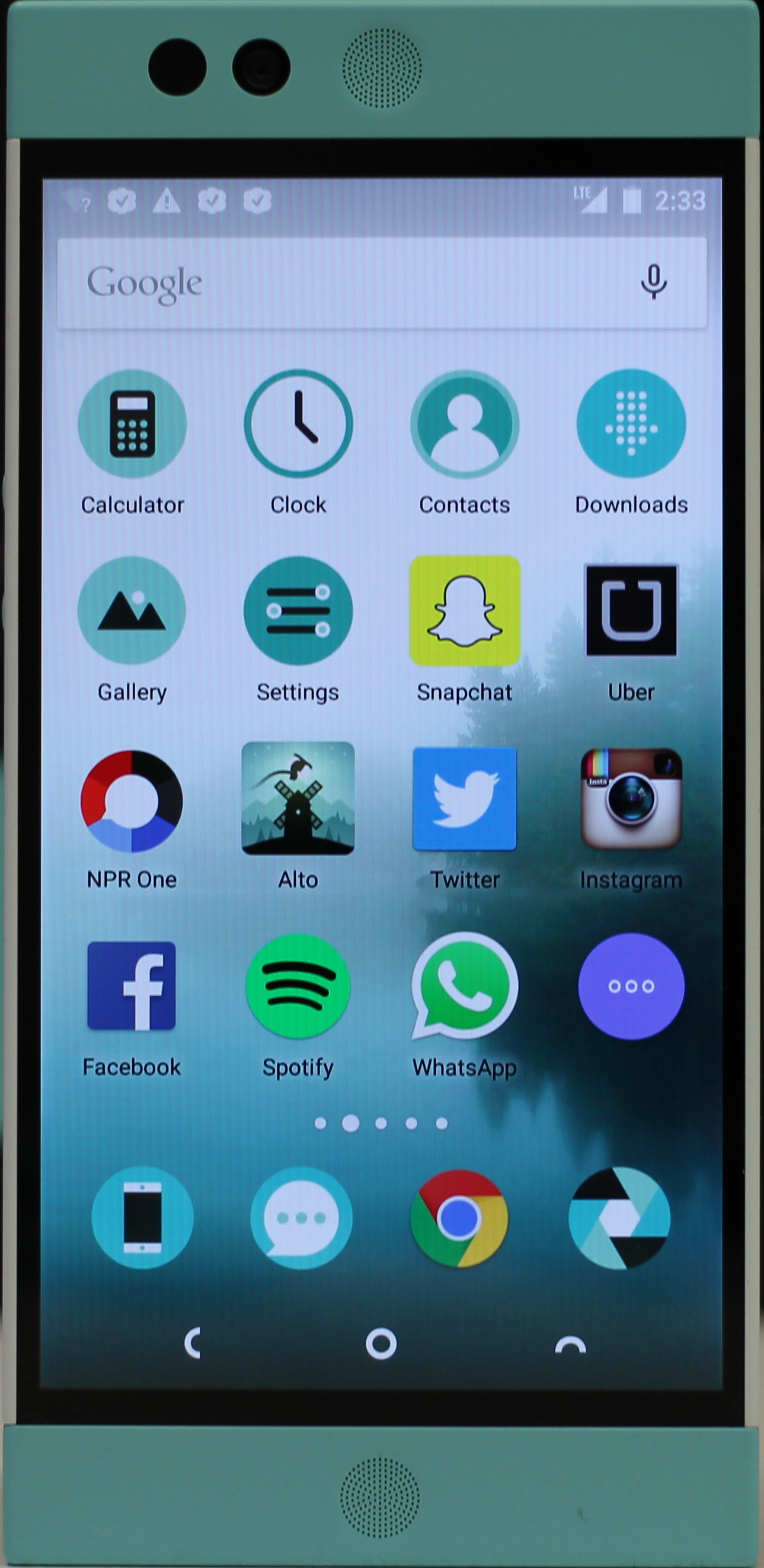
- Manufacturer: Nextbit (owned by Razer Inc.)
- Type: Smartphone
- First released: 16 February 2016; 10 years ago (Kickstarter)
- Discontinued: January 2017
- Successor: Nextbit Phoenix (unreleased) / Razer Phone (indirect)
- Form factor: Slate
- Dimensions: 149 mm (5.9 in) H 72 mm (2.8 in) W 7 mm (0.28 in) D
- Weight: 150 g (5.3 oz)
- Operating system: Original: Android 5.1.1 "Lollipop"; Current: Android 7.1.1 "Nougat"
- System-on-chip: Qualcomm Snapdragon 808 MSM8992
- CPU: Hexa-core (dual 1.82 GHz + quad 1.44 GHz) 64-bit custom CPU
- GPU: Adreno 418
- Memory: 3 GB LPDDR3 RAM
- Storage: 32 GB internal and 100 GB cloud storage (support ended)
- Battery: 2,680 mAh
- Rear camera: 13 MP with phase detection autofocus, dual-LED dual-tone flash
- Front camera: 5 MP
- Display: 5.2 in (130 mm) 1080p IPS LCD, 424 ppi
- Website: nextbit.com (defunct)

The Nextbit Robin was an Android-based smartphone manufactured by Nextbit Systems, a San Francisco-based startup founded in 2012 by former Google Android team members Tom Moss and Mike Chan, which was acquired by Razer Inc. in January 2017. The phone was marketed as "Cloud-first" where it utilized cloud storage to store data which wouldn't be used for a long period of time, thus saving space in the device's local storage.

The product and crowdfunding campaign was launched on Kickstarter on September 1, 2015. Twelve hours after it was launched, the phone reached its funding goal of US$500,000, much earlier than the expected goal of 30 days, and completed its $1 million goal within two weeks.

It was launched on February 16, 2016, when 1000 units of the GSM variant were shipped to its backers on Kickstarter, and an additional 2,300 units were sold through its official website.

In January 2017, Nextbit was bought by Singaporean-American videogame hardware manufacturer Razer Inc. Sales of the phone were halted almost immediately after the announcement. On March 1, 2018, the cloud storage feature was shut down by Nextbit. 10 months after the acquisition, in November 2017, Razer released the Razer Phone, their first game-centric smartphone, with the overall design based on the Robin.

== Specifications ==
=== Hardware ===
The Robin was mostly made of polycarbonate with a matte finish and a Gorilla Glass 4 front panel. The device weighs approximately 150 g (5.3 oz) and is 149 mm (5.9 in) tall, 72 mm (2.8 in) wide, and 7 mm (0.28 in) thick. The display of the device is a 5.2 in (130 mm) IPS LCD with a resolution of 1920 x 1080 pixels and pixel density of 424 ppi.

It is powered by a six-core Qualcomm Snapdragon 808 (MSM8992), with a 2 + 4 custom processor configuration (2x 1.82 GHz Cortex-A57 + 4x 1.44 GHz Cortex-A53) and 3 GB of LPDDR3 RAM.

=== Storage ===
The Robin comes with a built-in 32 GB of internal storage, but does not feature microSD card expansion. Instead, the smartphone utilized cloud storage. It had 100 GB of usable cloud storage offered by Nextbit out of the box, which is integrated within the phone's software as an additional "external" storage. Shortly after being purchased by Razer, Nextbit shut down the cloud storage feature on March 1, 2018, with data accessible until April 1, 2018.

When installed applications, for example, were not used by the user for a long period; the smartphone automatically detected them and archived them into the cloud to reduce internal storage usage. It also adapted to the usage patterns of the user and performed the backup process whenever applicable. The smartphone also stored the user's photos in the cloud in the default resolution appropriate for upload, until the user specified the resolution.

== Reception ==
=== Sales ===
Pre-orders after the Kickstarter campaign began in October 2015, with shipping set to start in February 2016. During the preorder period, the Nextbit Robin had estimated arrival time of February. The phone stopped being produced in January 2017, following the companies acquisition by Razer Inc.

=== Known issues ===
The Robin had suffered performance issues upon launch, including lag and slow performance of the camera. These issues were marked as resolved by Nextbit by releasing software updates in March and April. However, issues persist for many users. The smartphone was also quite easy to bend with both hands due to its all plastic housing, as was tested by Zack Nelson on his YouTube channel JerryRigEverything.
