= Thomas M. Franck =

Thomas Martin Franck (July 14, 1931 – May 27, 2009) was an American legal scholar and expert on international law. Franck was the Murry and Ida Becker Professor of Law at New York University and advised many nations on legal matters, even helping some to write their constitutions.

== Early life and education ==
Franck was born on July 17, 1931, in Berlin, the son of a Jewish family. In November 1938, his family fled Nazi Germany and spent six months in Switzerland. After being denied visas to emigrate to the United States, the Franck family obtained Canadian visas and moved to Vancouver.

Franck attended the University of British Columbia, where he received his B.A. in 1952 and Bachelor of Laws in 1953. He then began his teaching career as an assistant professor at the University of Nebraska in 1954. He further studied at Harvard University, where he received a Master of Laws (LL.M.) in 1954 and a Doctor of Juridical Science (S.J.D.) in 1959.

== Academic career ==
Franck joined the faculty of New York University in 1957 as an associate professor, becoming a full professor in 1962, and receiving a named chair, as the Murry and Ida Becker Professor of Law in 1988.

Franck published prolifically, as the author or co-author of 31 books. He also held various leadership positions and fellowships. In 1973 and 1982, he received Guggenheim Fellowships. From 1998 to 2000, he served as the president of the American Society of International Law, and in 1965 he served as the first director of the Center for International Studies at NYU. In addition to teaching at NYU, Franck taught as a visiting professor at the University of Cambridge, Stanford University and York University. He was a member of the Whitney R. Harris World Law Institute's International Council.

Franck's work on international law was well respected. David Kennedy, of Brown University, called Franck "the leading American scholar of international law".

=== Books ===
Franck's 31 books covered "a wide range of international issues," starting with his 1960 book Race and Nationalism: The Struggle for Power in Rhodesia-Nyasaland and ending with his 2002 book, Recourse to force : state action against threats and armed attacks.

In Race and Nationalism: The Struggle for Power in Rhodesia-Nyasaland, Franck studied the effect of nationalism on power struggles in Central Africa, based on research during his travels in Rhodesia in 1957. Writing in International Affairs, R.C. Pratt decisively criticized the book, calling it "shrill, without sympathetic insight, historical perspective, or understanding" and leading African historian Terence Ranger wrote that the book was "original only when it is inaccurate."

Franck's next major book, East African Unity Through Law, was published by Yale University Press in 1965. The book discussed African federalism in depth, and was largely informed by Franck's own experiences as a constitutional consultant for Zanzibar. In the book Franck showed the lack of success up to that time in efforts at transnational federations on the continent, arguing that this was largely the result of former colonial administrators who focused only on the problems of independence and neglected transnational issues. Franck was also critical of the British Commonwealth, and Louis Blom-Cooper wrote in International Affairs that Franck's points on the Commonwealth were "mildly prophetic."

In 1968, Franck finished his next book, A Free Trade Association, which he co-edited along with Edward Weisband. The book was based on the proceedings of a conference at NYU on a proposed free-trade association consisting of the United States, Canada, and the United Kingdom, envisioned as an alternative to the European Economic Community. Franck wrote the first chapter, examining the political implications of such an arrangement and argued that the United States needed to stay engaged with Western Europe.

The same year, Franck edited a second book, Why Federations Fail, which returned to many of the themes examined in East African Unity Through Law. The book examined several cases of failed federation, including a chapter on East Africa by Franck, and concluded with another chapter by Franck on the common themes of federation failure. In his concluding chapter, Franck emphasized the uniqueness of each individual federation, and the difficulty of finding common points, but he went on to conclude that ideological commitment was one of the most important prerequisites for federation.

Franck completed a third book in 1968, The Structure of Impartiality. In the book, Franck analyzed the absence of third-party, impartial decision makers in the international system. Franck wrote that "the failure of the international community to develop a system of third-party lawmaking compatible to that of the national community may well prove to be the fatal error of our civilization", and wrote of the many benefits that a third-party decision-making body would bring.

In 1971, Franck again collaborated with Edward Weisband on his next book, Word Politics: Verbal Strategy Among Superpowers. The book analyzed the importance of "how statesman [sic] rationalize their actions", arguing that the cover stories advanced by politicians to disguise acts of aggression had a profound, long-term effect on the international system. In particular, Franck and Weisband argued that the rationales advanced by the superpowers set a precedent for the action of both other major powers and for smaller and less powerful states who then felt it was justified to act as the major powers had. The book combined a theoretical framework for this process with case studies, showing how their theories had been at work in the previous several decades. The two showed, for example, that the United States's Johnson Doctrine used to justify intervention in the Dominican Republic in 1965 was almost identical to the Brezhnev Doctrine used to justify the Soviet invasion of Czechoslovakia three years later. Robert Jervis, in a review of the book for Public Opinion Quarterly, presented a detailed critique of some of the claims in the book, arguing that it overstated the role of words and understated the role of actions. Nonetheless, he concluded that the book made "an important contribution" to scholarship and showed that "words matter much more than realists believe."

== Legacy ==
Decolonization during the 1950s and 1960 implicated a process of drafting constitutions for the former colonies as they evolved into independent nation states. Franck was involved in developing constitutions for several African nations which were emerging from British rule Sierra Leone and Rhodesia, which is now known as Zimbabwe. He also worked on the constitution of Tanzania which encompassed the former Tanganyika and Zanzibar. He served as legal advisor to the African governments of Chad, Kenya and Mauritius; and in addition, he was a legal advisor to the governments of the Solomon Islands and El Salvador.

== Honors ==
- Guggenheim Fellowship, 1973 and 1982.
- American Society of International Law, President, 1998-2000.
