= Razer Inc. =

Singaporean-American technology company

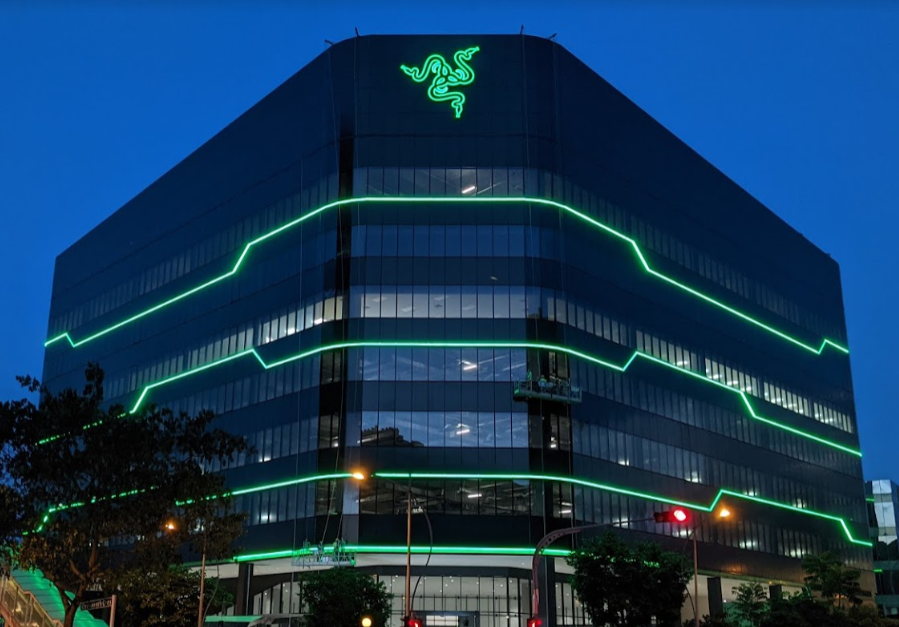
- Headquarters in Singapore
- Native name: Razer / 雷蛇
- Type: Private
- ISIN: KYG7397A1067
- Industry: Computer hardware; Consumer electronics; Digital distribution; Electronic media; Financial technology
- Founded: 1998; 28 years ago
- Founders: Min-Liang Tan; Robert Krakoff
- Headquarters: Queenstown, Singapore; Irvine, California, U.S.
- Area served: Worldwide
- Key people: Min-Liang Tan; (CEO and Creative Director); Patricia Liu; (Executive Director); Khaw Kheng Joo; (COO)
- Products: Laptops, peripherals, consoles, software
- Revenue: ▲US$1.62 billion (2021)
- Number of employees: 1,576 (2024)
- Subsidiaries: Ouya; THX; Nextbit
- Website: razer.com

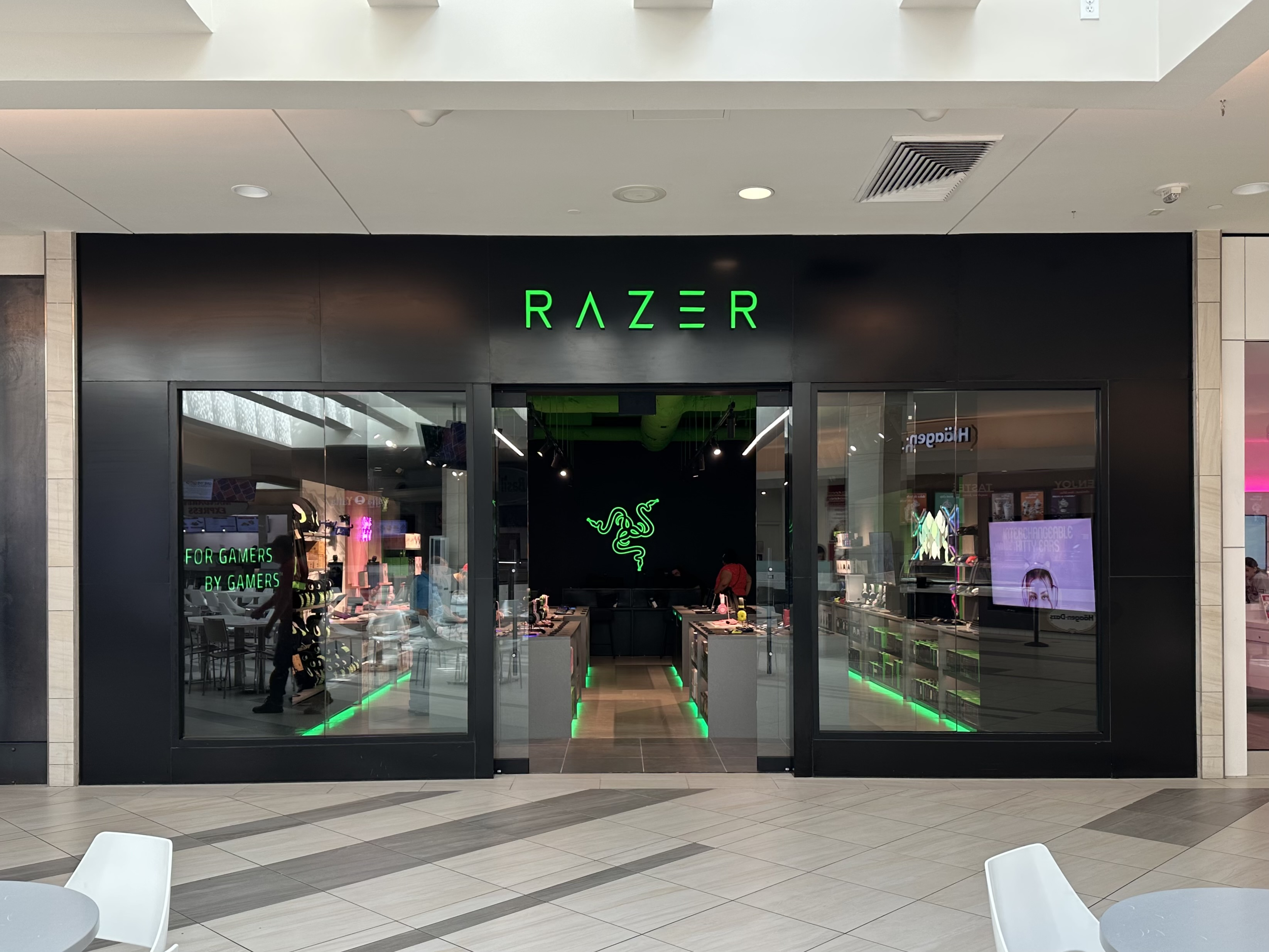
A Razer Store in Miami, Florida, U.S., in 2023

Razer Inc. is a Singaporean-American multinational corporation and technology company that manufactures, develops, and markets gaming-focused computer hardware and other consumer electronics as well as financial services.

Razer was founded in 1998 as a subsidiary of kärna LLC; after kärna declared bankruptcy in 2001, Razer was refounded in 2005 by Min-Liang Tan and Robert "RazerGuy" Krakoff. The company is dual-headquartered in the one-north sub-zone of Queenstown, Singapore, and Irvine, California, U.S.

== History ==
=== 1998–2005: Founding and early challenges ===
Razer began as a San Diego, California-based subsidiary of Kärna LLC in 1998, which was created to develop and market a high-end computer gaming mouse, the Boomslang, targeted to computer gamers. Kärna was shut down in 2001 due to bankruptcy.

The current iteration of Razer was founded in 2005 by Min-Liang Tan, a Singaporean NUS graduate, and Robert Krakoff after they procured the rights to the Razer brand following a large investment from Hong Kong tycoon Li Ka-shing and Singaporean holding company Temasek Holdings.

=== 2015–2016: Ouya acquisition and Forge TV ===
Razer bought the software assets of an Android-based microconsole called Ouya from its parent company Ouya Inc. on 27 July 2015, while the hardware was discontinued. Ouya's technical team joined Razer's team in developing its own microconsole, the Forge TV, which was discontinued in 2016.

=== 2016–2018: THX, Nextbit acquisition and expansions ===
According to THX CEO Ty Ahmad-Taylor, Razer purchased THX from Creative Technology in October 2016. Razer noted that THX's expertise in audio and visual quality would complement its own gaming-focused offerings, potentially expanding to areas like virtual reality and live streaming.

In January 2017, Razer bought manufacturer Nextbit, the startup behind the Robin smartphone. Shortly after in November that, Razer unveiled the Razer Phone, its first smartphone whose design is based on that of the Robin.

In July 2017, Razer filed to go public through an IPO in Hong Kong. In October, it was confirmed that Razer plans to offer 1,063,600,000 shares at a range of $0.38–$0.51. On 14 November, Razer was officially listed on Hong Kong Stock Exchange under the stock code 1337, a reference to leet speak commonly used by gamers. Razer's IPO closed 18% up on the first day of trading and was the 2nd most successful IPO of 2017 in Hong Kong.

In April 2018, Razer announced that it was planning to fully acquire the e-payments platform MOL for about $61 million. In July, Razer made its debut in Malaysia by launching an e-wallet service called Razer Pay. They also announced the Razer Phone 2 in October.

On 21 December 2018, Razer announced its new seven-story South-east Asia headquarters in the one-north subzone of Queenstown, Singapore. The building was expected to be ready by 2020, with Boustead Projects' joint venture firm constructing it. The exterior would be lit with LED strips representing a central processing unit in operation. Razer held its ground-breaking ceremony on 22 February 2019, with a new digital real estate start-up called Echo Base launched the same day. 600 more staff were planned over the next few years, adding to the 400 staff based then. The first smart city project in the region would be developed soon.

=== 2019–2020: Razer Game Store closure and pandemic response ===
In February 2019, Razer announced it was closing its Razer Game Store as part of the company's realignment plans.

On 21 May 2019, Razer released a statement that announced that Ouya online accounts and services would be discontinued on 25 June 2019. According to Razer, most apps will become unusable on the platform, many relying on the user accounts to work. Razer suggests that users may be able to transfer purchases to other storefront platforms like Google Play if developers and publishers agree to such.

In May 2020, Razer announced the Razer Health initiative, sponsoring high-quality certified surgical masks to governments, healthcare organizations, and individuals around the world.

In October 2020, Razer announced it was launching a new virtual prepaid debit card starting with Singapore in January 2021.

=== 2021–present: New headquarters and StreamElements acquisition ===
In 2021, Razer announced the shutting down of Razer Pay (Beta) e-wallet in Malaysia and Singapore.

In February 2021, CEO Tan Min-Liang announced that Razer will move its Singapore headquarters to a much larger building that would open in the second quarter of 2021. Razer planned to hire up to 1,000 positions for the new headquarters. The headquarters officially opened on 26 October 2021, which was officiated by the Deputy Prime Minister of Singapore, Heng Swee Keat, at the ceremony. The building consisted of a "RazerStore" and a "RazerCafe".

On 26 April 2022, Razer co-founder Robert Krakoff died. As of 12 May 2022, no cause of death has been confirmed from the company or his family.

In May 2022, Razer delisted from the Hong Kong Stock Exchange.

On 2 April 2025, Razer halted sales of all laptops and certain accessories from its U.S. website. This was the same day as the announcement of upcoming U.S. reciprocal tariffs. As of April 8, 2025, Razer has not published an official statement regarding the sales halt and if it was related to the tariffs.

In August 2025, Razer started the new AI Center of Excellence in Singapore and hired 150 people to fill AI-related roles at the center. This is the first of three planned, with others being planned in Europe and the U.S.

In October 2025 the company faced criticism for a TikTok video promoting an active noise cancellation feature for its gaming headsets, which viewers found to have utilized misogynistic cliches.

On 31 July 2026, Razer announced its acquisition of StreamElements, a provider of tools for live streaming.

== Products ==
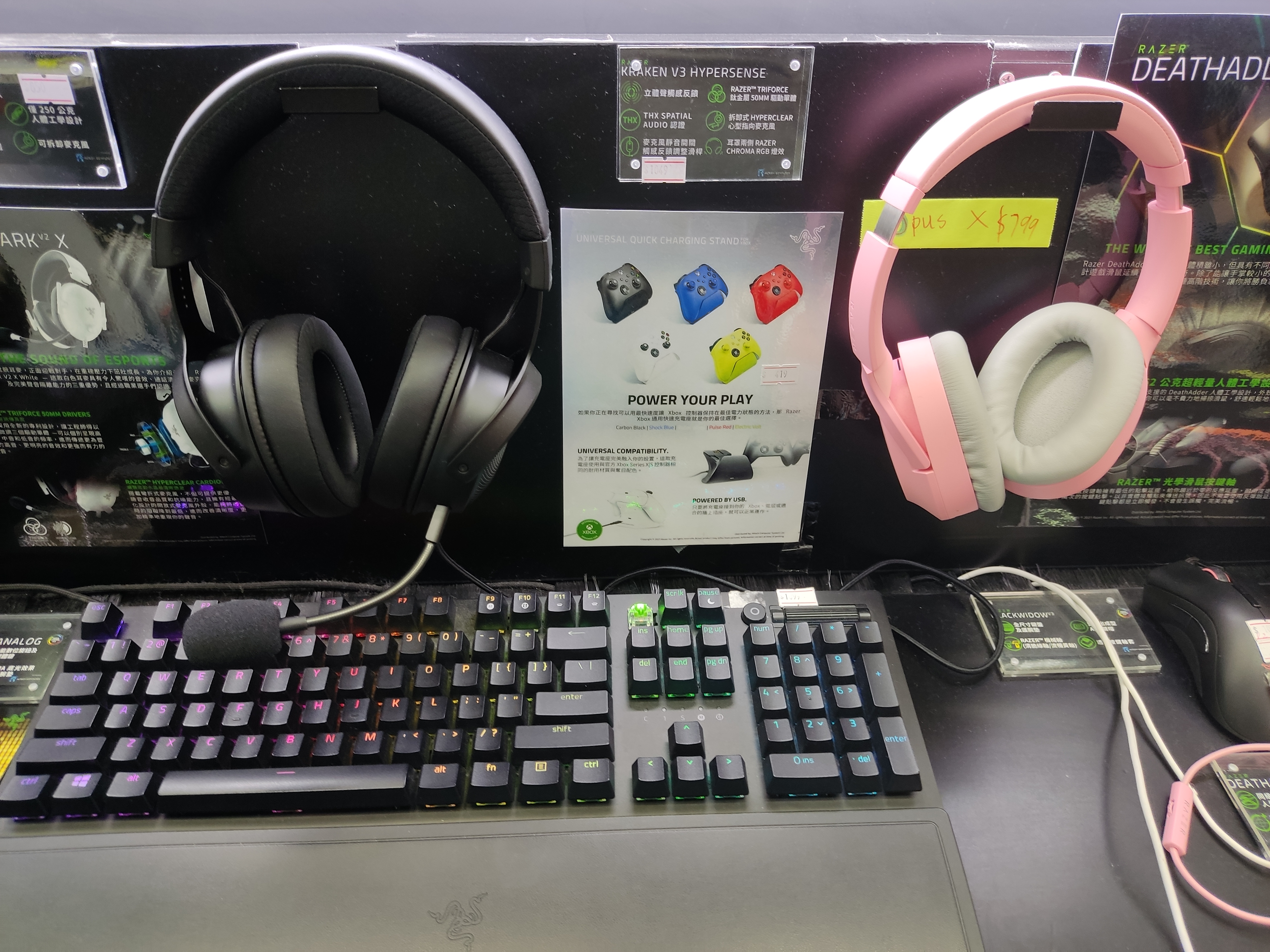
Razer gaming headsets, keyboard and mouse in 2022

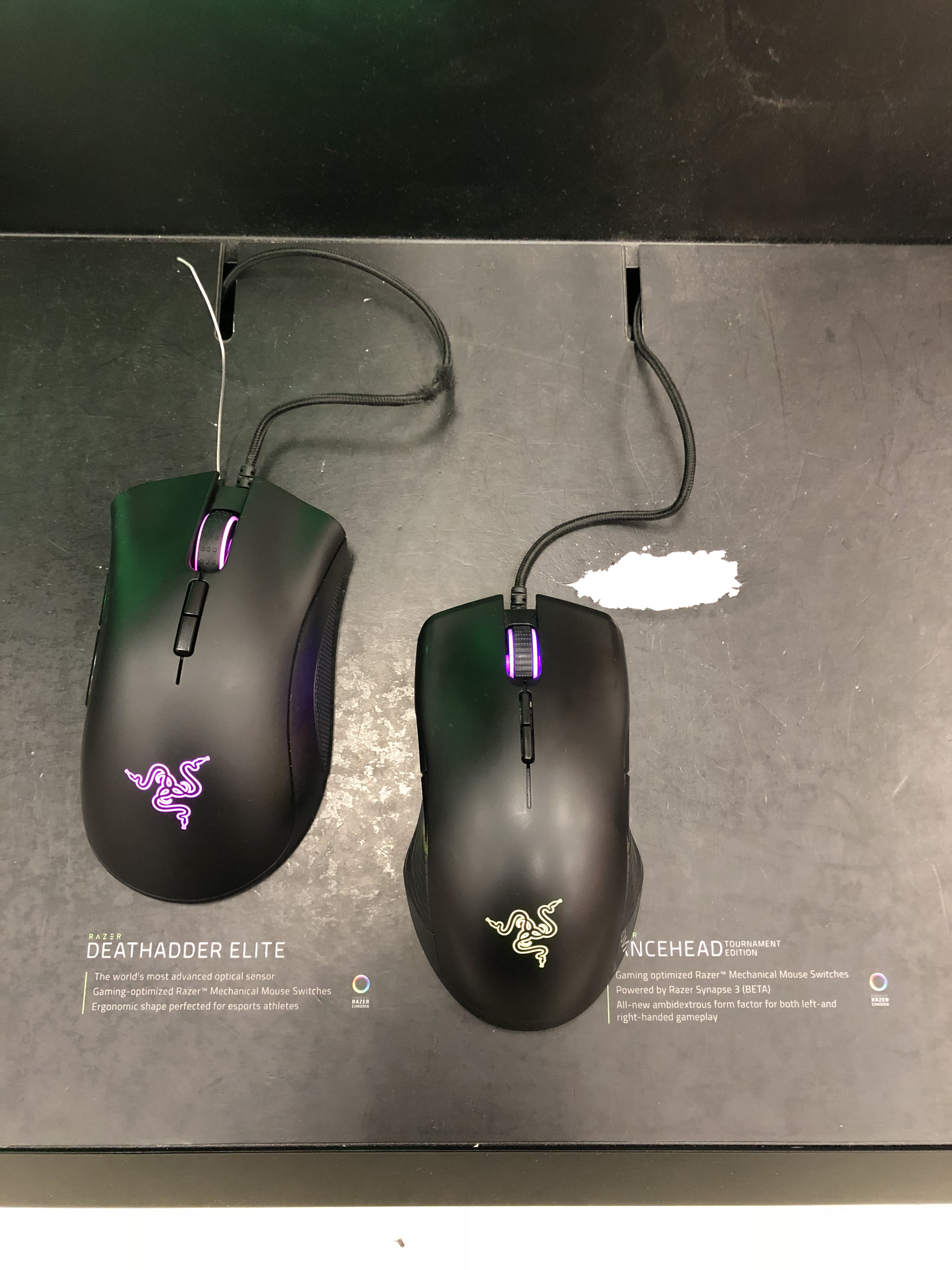
A Razer DeathAdder Elite (left) next to a Razer Lancehead Tournament Edition in 2018

Razer's products are generally targeted at gamers and include gaming laptops, gaming tablets, and PC peripherals such as mice, audio devices, keyboards, mouse mats, and gamepads. Most Razer products are named after predatory or venomous animals, ranging from snakes (mice), insects (mouse mats), arachnids (keyboards), marine creatures (audio), and felines (console peripherals). The exceptions to this are the Razer Blade series of laptops and Razer Edge gaming tablet. Razer has also released a VOIP software called Razer Comms.

The Razer DeathAdder gaming mouse introduced in 2006 is the company's most popular mouse line by sales, having sold over 20 million units worldwide by June 2024. Razer mice are used by around 8% of professional players of first-person shooters. In 2021, Razer introduced a new 8 kHz "HyperPolling" technology to power the Razer Viper 8K.

Razer announced its first gaming smartphone, the Razer Phone, in November 2017, which marked the company's first steps into the smartphone business.

In 2020, it launched the Razer Book, its first "mainstream" non-gaming laptop. In April 2022, Razer partnered with the deep learning company Lambda to launch its first Linux-oriented laptop, Tensorbook, which targeted machine learning engineers.

In January 2021, Razer launched a range of high-grade designer masks as part of the company's initiative, Project Hazel, in a move to encourage more people to wear masks due to the COVID-19 pandemic. The mask is designed to allow lip-reading by seeing facial cues when people talk, with LED lights to illuminate the wearer's face in dark environments. Project Hazel was later launched, renamed as the Zephyr in October 2021 as an N95-rated mask. However, it was discovered later in that year that it was not N95-rated, despite Razer claiming that it was; this caused it to update the language used in the page to saying that they are not N95-certified. In April 2024, a proposed settlement was announced by the Federal Trade Commission (FTC) that would require Razer to issue over $1.1 million in refunds to customers who purchased Zephyr masks, which the FTC alleges Razer made misleading statements about and failed to have tested by either the Food and Drug Administration or the National Institute for Occupational Safety and Health. The $1.1 million settlement was issued by the FTC in January 2025.

In 2021, it also entered the gaming chair market with the Iskur, an in-house designed chair for gaming. Subsequently, it introduced the Enki, a chair marketed for "all day gaming" and comfort.

In 2024, Razer introduced a new Razer Blade gaming laptop, which is the first gaming laptop to use Thunderbolt 5, an interface faster than its predecessor, Thunderbolt 4.

=== Razer Synapse ===
Razer Synapse is a tool that is pre-installed on laptops from Razer. It can also be downloaded from Razer's website. With the software, several functions of Razer products can be set, such as RGB lighting, polling rate, DPI, key profiles, tracking distance, and more.

=== Razer Core ===
- Razer Core - April 2016
- Razer Core V2 - November 2017
- Razer Core X - May 2018
- Razer Core X Chroma - April 2019
- Razer Core X V2 - July 2025

== See also ==
- List of computer hardware manufacturers
- List of financial services companies
- List of largest technology companies by revenue
- List of mechanical keyboards
- Open Source Virtual Reality (OSVR)
