= Andrew Phang =

Singaporean judge

The Honourable Justice Andrew Phang SC
- 潘文龙
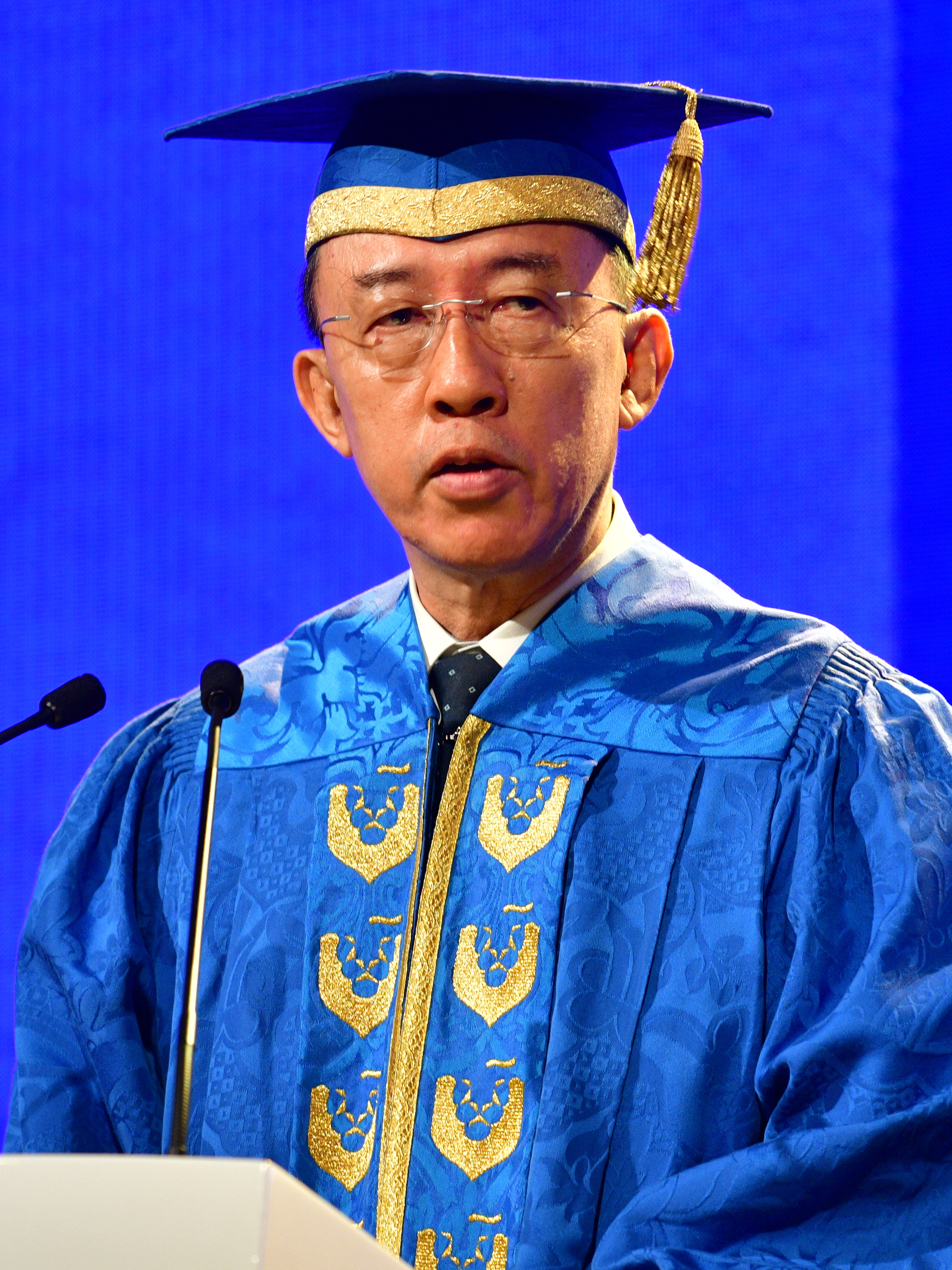
- Phang speaking at the 2019 Commencement ceremony of SMU School of Law

Senior Judge of the Supreme Court of Singapore
- Incumbent
- Assumed office 6 January 2023
- Appointed by: Halimah Yacob

Judge of Appeal of the Supreme Court of Singapore
- In office 28 February 2006 – 15 December 2022
- Appointed by: S. R. Nathan

Judge of the Supreme Court of Singapore
- In office 8 December 2005 – 28 February 2006
- Appointed by: S. R. Nathan

Judicial Commissioner of Singapore
- In office 3 January 2005 – 8 December 2005
- Appointed by: S. R. Nathan

Personal details
- Born: 15 December 1957 (age 68) Colony of Singapore
- Spouse: Phang Sock Yong
- Children: 2
- Education: National University of Singapore (LLB); Harvard University (LLM, SJD)

Andrew Phang
- Simplified Chinese: 潘文龙
Transcriptions
Standard Mandarin
- Hanyu Pinyin: Pān Wén Lóng

Andrew Phang Boon Leong SC PJG (born 15 December 1957) is a Singaporean judge in the Supreme Court, currently sitting as a senior judge.

== Early life and education ==
Born in 1957 in Singapore, Phang received his Bachelor of Laws (first class honours) from the University of Singapore in 1982, before earning his Master of Laws and Doctor of Juridical Science from Harvard Law School in 1984 and 1988 respectively.

== Career ==
=== Legal academic ===
Between 1982 and 2000, Phang taught at the National University of Singapore Faculty of Law, and was appointed professor of Law in 1999. He was appointed professor of Law at the Singapore Management University (SMU) in 2000, and made chairman of the Department of Law at SMU's Lee Kong Chian School of Business in 2001.

In 2004, together with Tan Cheng Han, he was one of the first two legal academics in Singapore to be conferred the title of senior counsel. He is presently a Distinguished Professor of Law at the Yong Pung How School of Law and is also a visiting professor at the University of Reading.

=== Supreme Court ===
Phang was appointed Judicial Commissioner in January 2005, Judge of the High Court in December 2005, and Judge of Appeal on 28 February 2006. At 48 years old, he was the youngest person to have been appointed a Judge of Appeal.

He is one of the leading authorities in contract law in Singapore and the Commonwealth. He was appointed vice-president of the Court of Appeal with effect from 28 September 2017 following his predecessor Chao Hick Tin's retirement.

Phang retired as a justice of the Court of Appeal on his 65th birthday, 15 December 2022. He was subsequently appointed as a senior judge.

In November 2023, he was honoured by NUS for his contributions to the legal profession. He has authored over 260 publications and 400 judgments. He has been described as a "legal legend and giant."

On 11 April 2024, Phang published a book on former Chief Justice Yong Pung How, a book launched by then Prime Minister Lee Hsien Loong.

=== Cases ===
Cases in which Phang sat as a judge include:

- ACB v Thomson Medical Pte Ltd [2017] SGCA 20 — concerning damages for upkeep costs in wrongful fertilisation cases.
- Turf Club Auto Emporium v Yeo Boong Hua [2018] SGCA 44 — concerning 'negotiating damages' / Wrotham Park damages

== Personal life ==
Phang's wife is Phang Sock Yong, an economics professor at the Singapore Management University. He has two daughters. Phang received the Meritorious Service Medal for his legal contributions in 2023.

== Selected works ==
=== Books ===
- Andrew B.L. Phang & Goh Yihan, Contract Law in Singapore, Kluwer Law International, 2012, ISBN 978-9-041-14627-4

=== Articles ===
- "Implied terms in English law — some recent developments" (1993) Journal of Business Law 242
- "The Challenge of Principled Gap Filling — A Study of Implied Terms in a Comparative Context" (2014) Journal of Business Law 263
