= Min-Liang Tan =

Singaporean entrepreneur (born 1977)

- 陈民亮
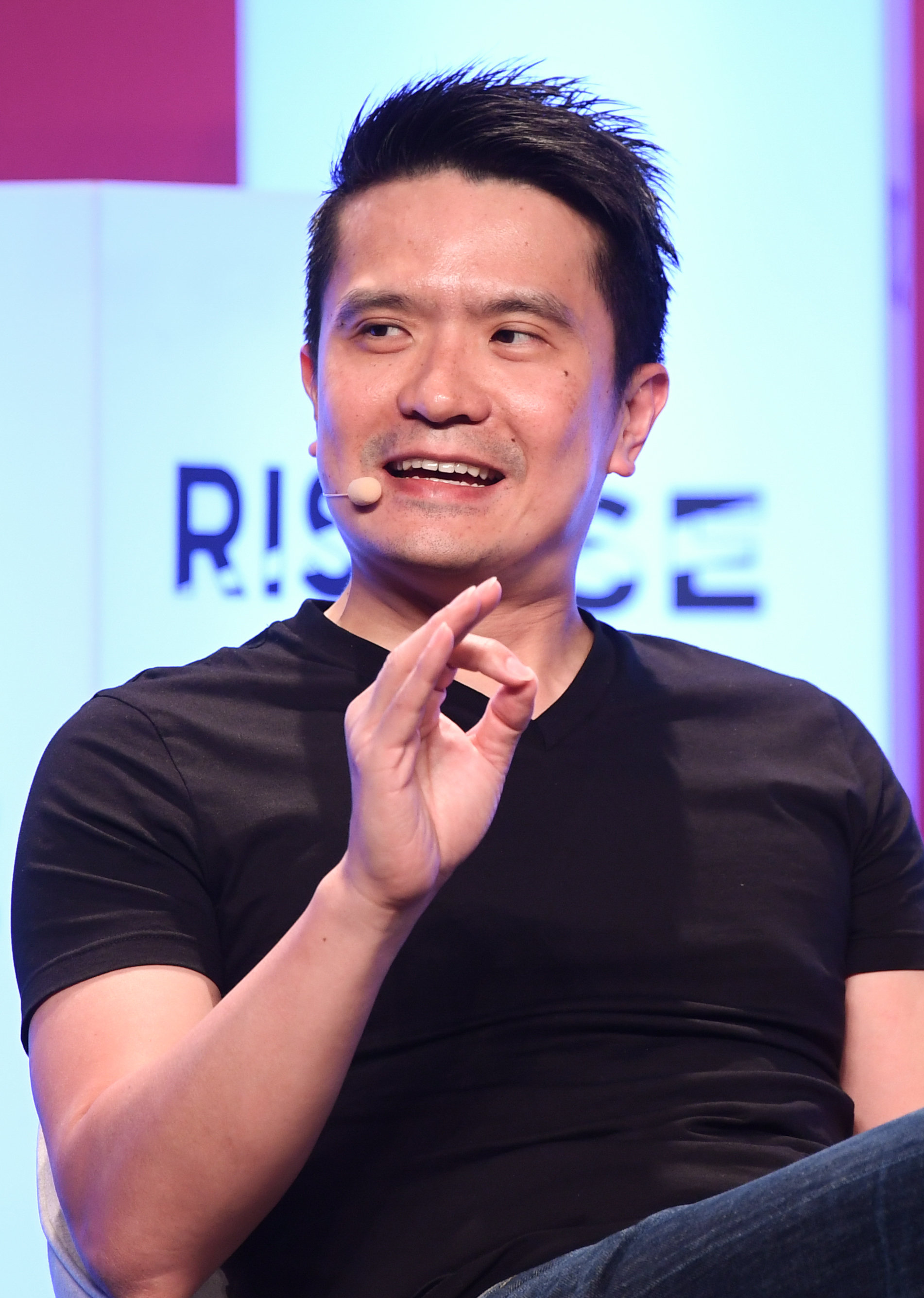
- Tan in 2019
- Born: 5 November 1977 (age 48); Singapore
- Education: National University of Singapore (LLB, LLM)
- Occupation: Businessman
- Years active: 1997–present
- Known for: Co-founding Razer Inc.
- Title: CEO of Razer Inc. CEO of THX

Min-Liang Tan or Tan Min Liang (born 5 November 1977) (Note: simplified Chinese: 陈民亮; traditional Chinese: 陳民亮; pinyin: Chén Mínliàng) is a Singaporean businessman, internet entrepreneur and former lawyer. He is the co-founder, chairman, chief executive officer (CEO) and creative director of the gaming hardware company Razer Inc., and the chairman and CEO of THX. He oversees the design and development of all Razer products. Tan was a lawyer before he co-founded Razer with Robert Krakoneoff.

Apart from Razer, Tan is a founding member of the Open Source Virtual Reality platform, which aims to create a common standard for VR program design. The next frontier for Razer has been said to lie in the realm of virtual reality, and Tan hopes to create an entire virtual reality industry, citing that the prospects are “phenomenal” in entertainment, health care and military applications. Tan is also a board member of the Intellectual Property Office of Singapore (IPOS).

Tan debuted in 2016 on the Forbes Singapore Rich List with a net worth of US$600 million and became the youngest self-made Singaporean billionaire at the age of 40 with a net worth of US$1.6 billion when Razer went public in 2017.

== Early life ==
Tan was born on 5 November 1977 in Singapore to Tan Kim Lee, a real estate consultant, and Low Ken Yin, a homemaker. Tan is the youngest of four children.

As a Singaporean, he is bilingual, being fluent in English and Mandarin Chinese. Two of Tan's siblings became doctors, one of whom is the clinician-scientist Tan Min Han, the founder, CEO and medical director of Singaporean genomic medicine company Lucence Diagnostics.

Tan attended Raffles Institution and Hwa Chong Junior College prior to university and graduated from the National University of Singapore Faculty of Law (NUS Law). Tan graduated with a Master of Laws, and was ranked top 20 in his post-graduate law class when he graduated in 2002.

== Career ==
Prior to founding Razer, Tan was an advocate and solicitor for the Supreme Court of Singapore.

In 1999, Tan and Robert Krakoff (who was GM of Kärna LLC) first met and worked together to design the world's first gaming mouse — the "Razer Boomslang".

In 2005, Tan and Krakoff founded Razer. Subsequently, Tan acquired the rights to the brand and officially incorporated Razer Inc, subsequently taking on the role of CEO and Creative Director of Razer.

On March 31, 2015, Tan was appointed as a board member of Intellectual Property Office of Singapore (IPOS).

On November 13, 2017, Razer had their IPO and Tan became the youngest self-made Singaporean billionaire at the age of 40. With Tan as CEO, the company developed gaming mobile phones but failed to develop its business-to-consumer Razer Pay e-wallet app after not getting the respective license in Singapore in 2020.

In 2023, Tan paid tribute to Sim Wong Hoo, the founder of Creative Technology, who died; Tan claimed he often met with Sim to "discuss things like audio technology and design."

=== Fan base and reputation ===
Tan has a cult-like following worldwide and his fans have created fan sites of him as well as tattooed Tan's name on themselves. One of his fans tattooed Tan's face on himself.

In December 2019, Kotaku published an exposé, based on the statements of 14 former Razer employees, containing wide allegations that under Tan's leadership Razer celebrates a culture of fear, and that Tan himself berates, threatens and shames his staff.

== Philanthropy ==
In March 2012, Tan contributed US$10,000 to the Wasteland 2 Kickstarter project where he admitted it was to atone for infringing the copyright of Wasteland when he was a child. Brian Fargo replies that Tan has more than made up for his downloading of the game.

In November 2014, Tan donated US$10,000 and did the Ice Bucket Challenge in an effort to raise funds for ALS.

In February 2015, Tan donated £10,000 to fight Motor Neuron Disease. The donation was done via Twitch live stream subscription to ProSyndicate.

== Media appearances ==
Tan was a backer of Wasteland 2 and Torment: Tides of Numenera on Kickstarter which resulted in him being added to both games as a non-player character. He also appears in Shroud of the Avatar: Forsaken Virtues.

Tan has also had cameos in movies like Dead Rising: Watchtower where he acted as a zombie.
