= National University of Singapore Faculty of Law =

Law school in Singapore

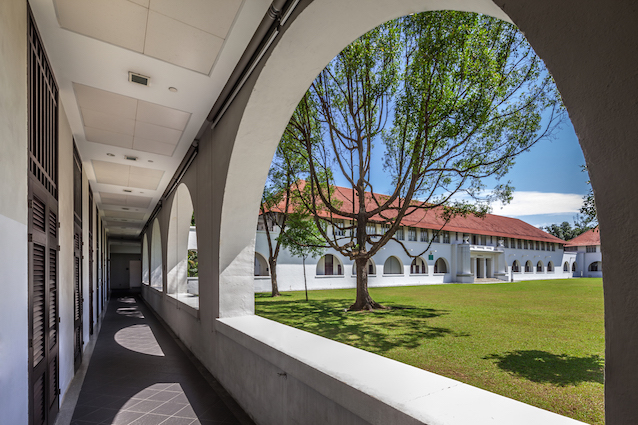
- Type: Public; Law School
- Established: 1956
- Parent institution: National University of Singapore
- Dean: Andrew Simester
- Location: 21 Lower Kent Ridge Road, Singapore 119077, Singapore, Singapore; 1.3069°N 103.7734°E
- Website: law.nus.edu.sg

The National University of Singapore Faculty of Law (NUS Law) is Singapore's oldest law school. NUS Law was initially established in 1956 as the Department of Law in the University of Malaya, and subsequently, University of Singapore. After its establishment, NUS Law was Singapore's only law school for half a century, until the subsequent establishment of the SMU School of Law in 2007 and the SUSS School of Law in 2017. The current dean of NUS Law is Andrew Simester. Internationally, NUS Law is Asia's highest ranked law school, and has been ranked sixth in the world by the QS World University Rankings by Subject in 2026 and eleventh by the Times Higher Education World University Rankings by Subject in 2024.

== History ==
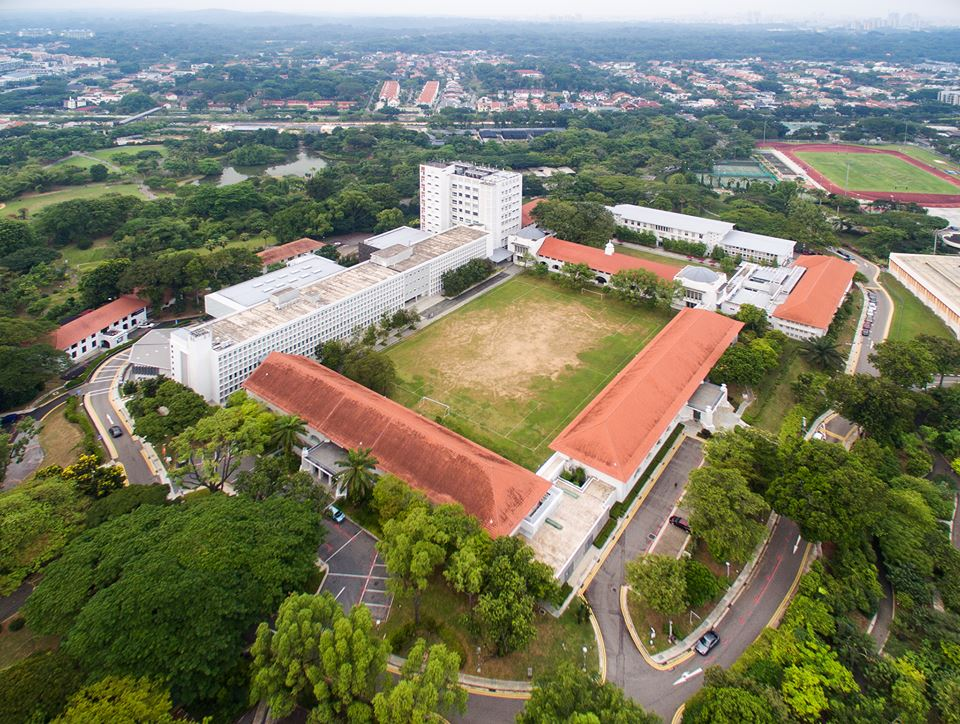
NUS Bukit Timah Campus from the air

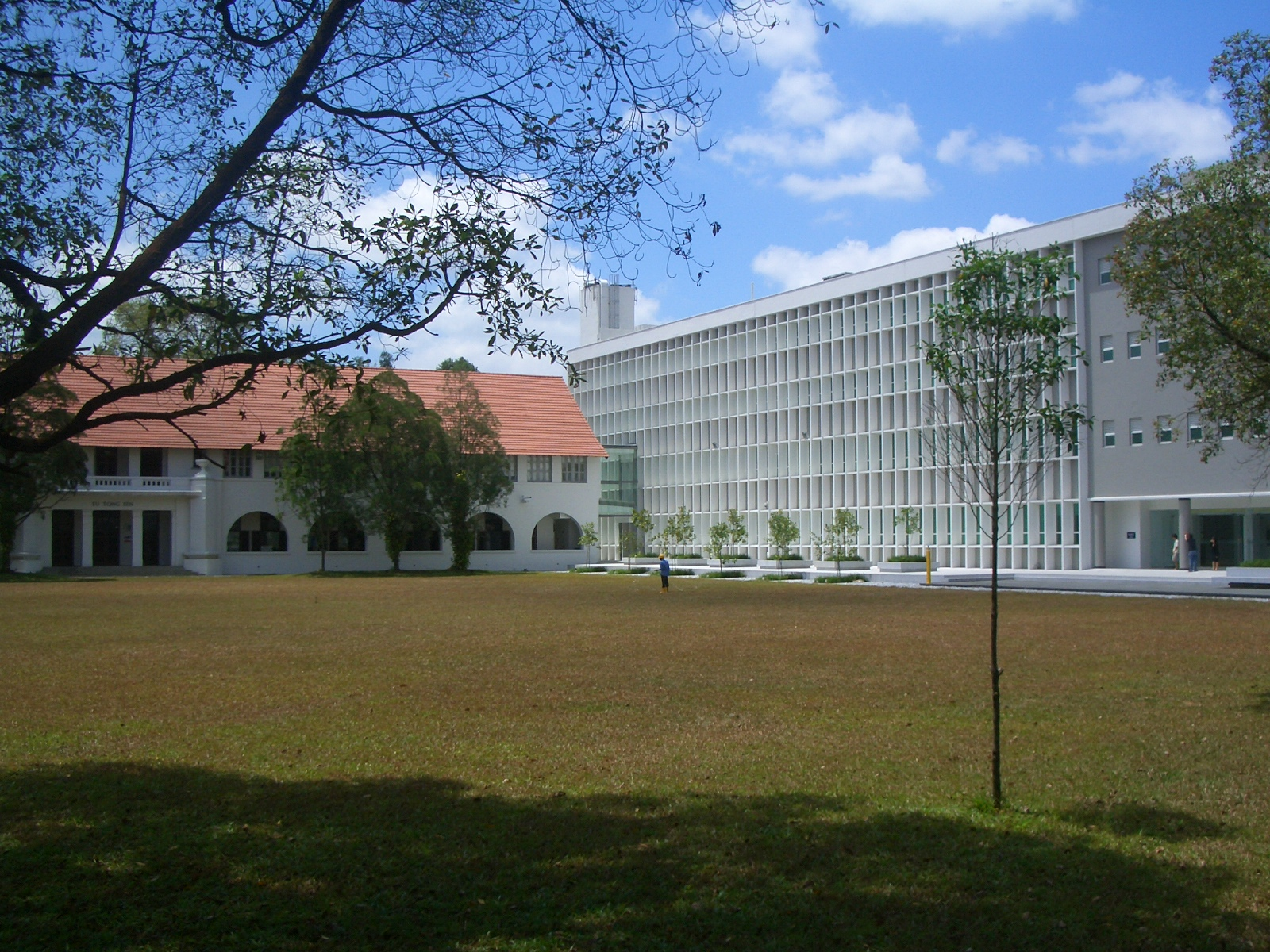
The Eu Tong Sen building and Block "B"

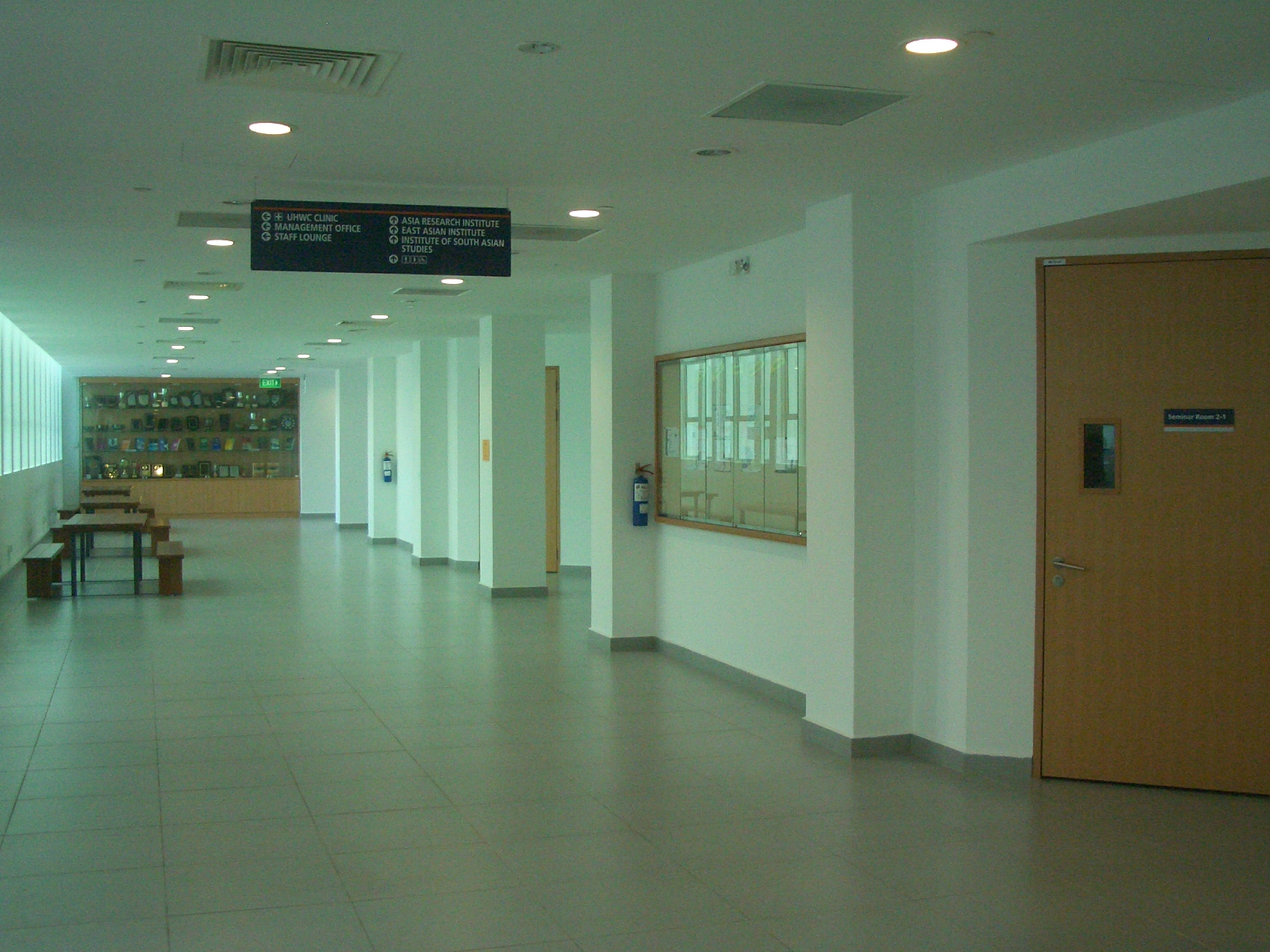
Inside Block "B": the corridors of the law school

After its establishment in 1956 as the Department of Law of the University of Malaya, NUS Law attained faculty status in 1959, and Lionel Astor Sheridan was appointed as its founding dean. Its pioneer batch of students graduated in 1961, featuring future notable figures such as Chan Sek Keong and Tommy Koh. After the division of the University of Malaya in 1962, the faculty continued as part of the new University of Singapore. Subsequently, the faculty became part of the National University of Singapore which was formed in 1980 by a merger between the University of Singapore and Nanyang University.

In August 2025, the faculty moved from NUS' Bukit Timah Campus to its Kent Ridge Campus.

== Undergraduate programmes ==
The LL.B. programme at NUS Law is a four-year programme. Students take compulsory modules in their first two years and elective modules in their third and fourth years. In terms of exposure to non-law subjects, students may choose to take non-law elective modules offered by other NUS faculties, read for minors outside of law, and take on concurrent or double degree programmes.

Undergraduate students may go on exchange to study in a law school in a foreign jurisdiction. This selection is determined by merit through students' academic grades. Students on the exchange programme pay only tuition fees at the NUS Law rate. Selected students can also combine completion of their LL.B. at NUS Law with an LL.M. from a partner institution in four years.

The indicative grade profile of the tenth percentile of GCE A-Level applicants offered places in its LL.B. programme in 2025 was AAA/A. Applicants with a grade profile of AAA/A are shortlisted to sit for a written test and attend a formal interview to assess their suitability for the study of law. Approximately 240 students are selected from an applicant pool of 2,000 or more.

== Graduate programmes ==
For graduate students, NUS Law offers a J.D. programme, several coursework LL.M. programmes, and a research Ph.D. programme. Admissions for graduate programmes generally require a good bachelor's degree in law.

== Publications ==
NUS Law publishes the Singapore Journal of Legal Studies, one of the oldest law journals in the Commonwealth. It also produces the Asian Journal of International Law (which is published by Cambridge University Press and succeeds the Singapore Year Book of International Law), and the Asian Journal of Comparative Law (also published by Cambridge University Press).

Additionally, the Singapore Law Review, which is Asia's oldest student-run legal publication, is managed exclusively by the students of NUS Law.

== Centres ==
NUS Law hosts the following centres:

Centre	Established
Asia-Pacific Centre for Environmental Law (APCEL)	1996
Asian Law Institute (ASLI)	2003
Centre for International Law (CIL)	2009
Centre for Asian Legal Studies (CALS)	2012
EW Barker Centre for Law & Business (EWBCLB)	2013
Centre for Banking & Finance Law (CBFL)	2014
Centre for Legal Theory (CLT)	2015
Centre for Maritime Law (CML)	2015
Centre for Pro Bono & Clinical Education (CPBCLE)	2017
Centre for Technology, Robotics, Artificial Intelligence & the Law (TRAIL)	2019

In addition, NUS Law also hosts the Secretariat of the Asian Society of International Law (AsianSIL).

== Deans ==
The deans of NUS Law from 1956 to present are listed below:

S/N	Name	Term of office
1.	Lionel Astor Sheridan	1956–1962
2.	Chua Boon Lan	1962–1963
3.	Harry E. Groves	1963–1964
4.	Leslie C. Green	1964–1965
5.	James Louis Montrose	1965–1966
6.	Geoffrey W. Bartholomew	1966–1968
7.	Thio Su Mien	1968–1971
8.	Tommy Koh	1971–1974
9.	S. Jayakumar	1974–1980
10.	Tan Sook Yee	1980–1987
11.	Tan Lee Meng	1987–1992
12.	Chin Tet Yung	1992–2001
13.	Tan Cheng Han	2001–2011
14.	Simon Chesterman	2012–2022
15.	Andrew Simester	2023–

== Notable alumni ==
NUS Law has produced a number of notable alumni, including Senior Counsel, Attorneys-General, Members of the Singapore Parliament, Ministers of the Cabinet of Singapore and Judges of the Supreme Court of Singapore:

=== Academia ===
- Tan Cheng Han, SC – former Dean of NUS Faculty of Law
- Thio Su-Mien – former Dean of NUS Faculty of Law
- Leslie Chew, SC – founding Dean of SUSS School of Law

=== Arts ===
- Eleanor Wong – playwright
- Ong Keng Sen – Director of theatre group, TheatreWorks
- Adrian Tan – Author of Teenage Textbook series and 27th President of the Law Society of Singapore

=== Business ===
- Tan Min-Liang – Co-founder, CEO and Creative Director of Razer Inc
- Priscilla Shunmugam – Founder of Ong Shunmugam
- Wong Peck Lin – Co-founder of Udders
- Lyn Lee – Founder of Awfully Chocolate and Sinpopo

=== Judicial ===
- Sundaresh Menon, SC – Chief Justice and former Attorney-General
- Chan Sek Keong, SC – former Attorney-General, and former Chief Justice
- Steven Chong, SC – Judge of Appeal, former Attorney-General, and former Managing Partner of Rajah & Tann
- Tay Yong Kwang – Judge of Appeal of the Supreme Court of Singapore
- Andrew Ang – former Supreme Court Judge
- Kan Ting Chiu – former Supreme Court Judge
- Lai Siu Chiu – former Supreme Court Judge
- Foo Chee Hock, SC – former Supreme Court Judicial Commissioner, and Founding Dean of the Singapore Judicial College
- Hri Kumar, SC – Supreme Court Judge, former Deputy Attorney-General and former Member of Parliament for Bishan-Toa Payoh GRC
- Andrew Phang, SC – former Judge of Appeal
- Woo Bih Li, SC – Supreme Court Judge
- Judith Prakash – Senior Judge and former Judge of Appeal
- V. K. Rajah, SC – former Judge of Appeal, and Attorney-General, and former Managing Partner of Rajah & Tann
- Tan Lee Meng – Supreme Court Judge and former Dean of NUS Faculty of Law
- Ahmad Fairuz Abdul Halim – former Chief Justice of Malaysia

=== Public service ===
- Tommy Koh – Ambassador-at-Large for Singapore and former Dean of NUS Faculty of Law
- Ong Keng Yong – Director of the Institute of Policy Studies and former Secretary-General of ASEAN
- Daren Tang – Director General of the World Intellectual Property Organization
- Walter Woon, SC – former Attorney-General and diplomat

=== Politics ===
- K. Shanmugam, SC – Minister for Law, and Home Affairs
- Davinder Singh, SC – former CEO of Drew & Napier and former Member of Parliament
- Desmond Lee – Minister for National Development
- Edwin Tong, SC – Minister for Culture, Community and Youth and Second Minister for Law
- Indranee Rajah, SC – Minister in the Prime Minister's Office
- S. Jayakumar – former Deputy Prime Minister, and Dean of NUS Faculty of Law
- Halimah Yacob – 8th President of Singapore
- Ho Peng Kee – former Senior Minister of State for Law, and Home Affairs
- Sin Boon Ann – former Member of Parliament for Tampines GRC
- Sylvia Lim – Chair of the Workers' Party
- Karpal Singh – Former Member of the Malaysian Parliament
- Murali Pillai, SC – Minister of State for Law and for Transport
