= Samuel Thurman =

American lawyer

Samuel D. Thurman (1913–1995) was an American lawyer, having been Distinguished Professor at S. J. Quinney College of Law, University of Utah. He was awarded an honorary doctorate from University of Utah in 1988.

Thurman was born and raised in Salt Lake City. His father was also a lawyer. He received his law degree from Stanford University, after which he was for a time in private practice with his father.

Thurman was a member of the academic advisory committee of the Second Restatement of Torts. In the early 1980s, he was a professor at Pepperdine University's School of Law, where he taught tort law.

Thurman was a Mormon.
