= Tan Cheng Han =

Singaporean lawyer and legal academic

Tan Cheng Han SC
- 陈清汉
- Occupations: lawyer, legal academic
- Known for: Dean of the National University of Singapore Faculty of Law

Academic background
- Education: Bachelor of Laws; Master of Laws
- Alma mater: National University of Singapore; University of Cambridge

Tan Cheng Han
- Simplified Chinese: 陈清汉
Transcriptions
Standard Mandarin
- Hanyu Pinyin: Chén Qīng Hàn

Tan Cheng Han SC is a Singaporean lawyer and legal academic. Until 2012, he was the dean of the National University of Singapore Faculty of Law, where he taught contract law and company Law and directed the EW Barker Centre for Law & Business. From 2019 to 2022, he was the dean of the City University of Hong Kong School of Law and the chair professor of commercial law. He was also a consultant at TSMP Law Corporation. In August 2012, he was appointed the inaugural chairman of Singapore's new Media Literacy Council.

== Education ==
Tan graduated with a Bachelor of Laws in 1987 and then obtained his Master of Laws from the University of Cambridge in 1990.

== Career ==
=== Legal career ===
Tan joined Allen & Gledhill after obtaining his masters. After working for a while, he decided to leave the firm and joined National University of Singapore (NUS) as an academic.

After spending five years in NUS, Tan rejoined the legal industry and joined Drew & Napier. This time, Tan spent three years in the industry before deciding to go back to an academic career in 1996.

Tan also practices as an advocate specialising in complicated commercial disputes and is a member of the Singapore International Arbitration Centre's Regional Panel of Arbitrators. Tan was appointed Senior Counsel in 2004 at the age of 39, and together with fellow Andrew Phang, became the first academics to be so appointed.

In August 2006, Tan was appointed to the Subordinate Courts' Bench as a new specialist judge to preside over the Informatics case.

In October 2023, Tan joined WongPartnership as a senior consultant. The firm stated that Tan will not be involved in any Singapore Exchange matters in his role with the law firm.

On 17 December 2025, after a meeting of the Law Society of Singapore, Tan will be reconstituted as president in 2026 after previously elected president Dinesh Singh Dhillon consented to step down as President. The change in leadership occurred after an EGM was convened protesting Dhillon's presidency.

=== Academic career ===
Tan joined NUS for five years before returning to a legal career. In 1996, Tan returned to NUS.

=== Other appointments ===
Tan's current public appointments include the following:

- Chairman of the Singapore Media Literacy Council
- Chairman of the Advisory Committee on Move-On and Filming Orders
- President of the Singapore Tae Kwon-do Federation
- Commissioner of the Competition Commission of Singapore
- Member of the Appeal Advisory Panel to the Singapore Minister for Finance
- Member of the Military Court of Appeal in Singapore
- Member of the Governing Board of the International Association of Law Schools
- Chairperson of the Singapore Exchange Regulation

In 2004, Tan was one of three Singaporeans who were chosen out of a pool of 8,000 candidates worldwide to be part of The Forum of Young Global Leaders, a forum which was created by Klaus Schwab, founder and former executive chairman of the World Economic Forum. In 2005, Tan was also named by the Straits Times as one of "50 young Singaporeans to watch".

He was also awarded the Public Administration Medal (Silver) at Singapore's 41st National Day celebrations.
