= 2022 Ang Mo Kio flat stabbing =

2022 murder of a pregnant woman by her husband in Singapore

Death of Isabel Elizabeth Francis
- Location: Ang Mo Kio, Singapore
- Date: 11 January 2022
- Attack type: Murder
- Weapon: Fruit knife
- Victims: Isabel Elizabeth Francis and unborn baby Leah
- Perpetrator: David Brian Chow Kwok-Hun
- Motive: Attempted family annihilation and mercy killing to supposedly spare victim from business failure, erroneously due to mistaken financial reporting
- Charges: Seven years in prison
- Convictions: Manslaughter on the grounds of diminished responsibility

On 11 January 2022, 30-year-old Isabel Elizabeth Francis, who was 15 weeks pregnant with a daughter, was stabbed to death by her 33-year-old husband, David Brian Chow Kwok-Hun (Chinese: 周国坤; pinyin: Zhōu Guókūn), inside their Ang Mo Kio flat. Chow, who was arrested and indicted for murder, was said to have misunderstood that his company would go bankrupt due to an accounting error made by his employee.

Due to increasing depression over the "financial crisis" at his company, Chow wanted to commit suicide but he thought killing his wife and unborn daughter would spare them from the heartbreak and shame of losing a loved one to suicide. He used a fruit knife to stab Francis to death before attempting suicide twice, but survived both attempts.

Chow was later diagnosed with adjustment disorder, which caused him to suffer from an abnormality of the mind at the time of the offence, so Chow's murder charge was reduced to manslaughter on the grounds of diminished responsibility. He was sentenced to seven years in prison on 26 October 2023.

== Background ==
=== Victim ===
Isabel Elizabeth Francis
- Born: 4 September 1991; Singapore
- Died: 11 January 2022 (aged 30); Ang Mo Kio, Singapore
- Cause of death: Two fatal knife wounds to the lungs
- Education: CHIJ Toa Payoh; Ngee Ann Polytechnic; Royal Melbourne Institute of Technology (RMIT) Singapore; SUSS School of Law (incomplete)
- Occupations: Assistant manager Part-time law student
- Employer: Deliveroo
- Known for: Murder victim
- Spouse: David Brian Chow Kwok-Hun (her killer)
- Children: One unborn daughter Leah (deceased)

Born on 4 September 1991, Isabel Elizabeth Francis, an Eurasian Singaporean, was the second of three children, and had one younger brother (born in 1993) and one elder sister (born in 1988) who was diagnosed with special needs. At one point during her childhood, Francis's parents divorced, and her mother gained custody of all three children, who went to live with their mother and aunt somewhere in the East Coast area of Singapore.

According to her brother Emanuel, Francis and her siblings shared a very close relationship, and together, they would record song covers at home, with Emanuel playing the guitar and Francis singing. Francis and her siblings were raised Catholic, and they regularly went to the Church of Christ the King in Ang Mo Kio, where Francis taught catechism classes. Francis was described as an outgoing, generous and loving person, and often mingled with her friends. Francis studied at CHIJ Toa Payoh before she enrolled in Ngee Ann Polytechnic, where she pursued a diploma in mass communications. After completing her diploma, Francis furthered her studies at the Royal Melbourne Institute of Technology (RMIT) Singapore.

Francis first met her husband David Brian Chow in 2014 when she became an intern at his family's security training company and they started dating soon after she left the company, before they married on 28 December 2019. As of 2022 when she was murdered, Francis worked as an assistant manager at Deliveroo, and she enrolled as a part-time student at the law school of Singapore University of Social Sciences.

=== Perpetrator ===
David Brian Chow Kwok-Hun, born in Singapore in 1988, was the third of four children. Chow was reported to have struggled in his studies during his younger years, but he managed to enter university and graduated with a degree. According to sources, Chow felt inferior to his three siblings, who were reportedly doing much better than him in life and school. Chow, who would become the director and chief executive of his family's training company, found success in the business while running it, and many acknowledged Chow's good character at work and outside it. Chow was also the director of another company that provided both online and physical security services.

=== Motive ===
In December 2021, Chow received the training company's half-year financial report from an accounting staff member and found the numbers to be unusually poor. This caused Chow to believe that the business would fail and go bankrupt, and he gradually became plagued with depression and worry, so much so that he lost sleep due to worry and stress over the company's finances, only getting one or two hours sleep every night. Based on the records, Chow's company had earned about S$1 million in profits between July 2020 and June 2021, and never suffered any financial loss between July 2021 and November 2021 even during the COVID-19 pandemic. However, these numbers did not stop Chow from worrying about the projected financial loss his business had encountered. Despite the re-assurances from his colleagues, family members and his wife, Chow's behaviour did not improve. It worsened so much that Chow's father decided to bring him to see a psychiatrist on the same date of the murder. Chow's wife similarly arranged for her husband to consult a Catholic counsellor.

== Stabbing ==
On the early morning of 11 January 2022, at about 1 AM, Chow was unable to sleep and he paced up and down the corridor of his flat, his mind still full of his business concerns. He searched the LinkedIn profiles of his business competitors. Chow began to worry that his employees would leave his company or lose confidence in him, given that they had witnessed him breaking down at the workplace. Having bottled up and mulled over the impending financial crisis of his business, Chow decided to commit suicide, but he could not bear to allow Francis and their unborn child to suffer the pain, sadness and shame of losing a husband and father to suicide. He was afraid that should his business failed, it would lead to the harassment of his wife and child.

Chow decided that the only way out was to kill his wife before he killed himself, and hoped that he would reunite with his wife and child in heaven. At about 5 AM, Chow grabbed the sharpest knife from the kitchen, and returned to the master bedroom, where 30-year-old Isabel Elizabeth Francis was sleeping. Chow stabbed her multiple times; as Francis shrieked in pain, Chow used his left hand to cover her mouth and silence her. Chow reportedly told her he was sorry and said there was no way out as he continued stabbing Francis. At one point during the stabbing, Francis managed to get out of the bedroom and crawled to the front door, but Chow caught up with her and plunged the knife into her head until she no longer moved.

After Francis became motionless, Chow headed to the kitchen to get another knife, and he stabbed himself in the neck and stomach. Chow then knelt on the floor and prayed to the devil to "take him". Sometime after 7 AM, Chow, who remained alive despite his wounds, checked the time and realized that his father was on his way to bring him to the psychiatrist. Alarmed that he did not die fast enough, Chow consumed a random assortment of tablets, expecting to die from a drug overdose, though survived. At about 7:35 AM, Chow chose to surrender himself, contacted the police and confessed to murdering his wife. He also called his father and told him not to come and fetch him, because he did not want to implicate his father. Chow went to unlock the door and he laid on the floor, waiting for the police to arrive and arrest him. After their arrival, the police arrested Chow and rushed him to the hospital for treatment. Francis was pronounced dead at the scene.

It was only after the murder happened that the accounting staff at Chow's company discovered that they had made a grave error in their financial report; Chow's company was neither on the verge of bankruptcy nor doing financially poorly, and the company still made lots of profit.

=== Police response ===
On the morning of 11 January 2022, police responded to a report regarding a stabbing that happened in a flat at Ang Mo Kio. The police arrived at the flat, where they discovered a man alive with multiple injuries with a woman lying motionless with multiple stab wounds all over her body. The injured man was rushed to hospital while the woman was pronounced dead at the scene.

According to an autopsy report, Francis sustained a total of 15 stab wounds on the head, neck and torso, and two of them were sufficient in the ordinary course of nature to cause death, as one penetrated the left lung while the other was inflicted on the upper part of Francis's neck. The report also determined that at the time of her death, Francis was pregnant for an estimated 15 weeks, and the foetus was a girl. A law school student and female classmate of Francis from Singapore University of Social Sciences told the press that two weeks before her death, Francis had told her she was pregnant and was expecting to give birth in the middle of the year. Residents told the press that they never sensed anything amiss on the morning the murder happened. They noted that the couple went outdoors for exercise regularly and they celebrated Christmas together with family and friends weeks before the murder. One neighbour, however, stated that she briefly heard someone screaming before the murder was uncovered by the police.

The police later announced that they had placed the victim's husband under arrest for murder after some preliminary investigations, and the police confirmed that the suspect would be charged with murder. A bloodstained fruit knife, believed to be the murder weapon, was recovered from the flat.

=== Murder charge ===
On 12 January 2022, a day after his arrest, Francis's 33-year-old husband, David Brian Chow Kwok-Hun, who was still hospitalized for his injuries, was officially charged with the murder of his pregnant wife by a field magistrate at Tan Tock Seng Hospital. As the charge of murder under Singaporean law carried the penalty of death by hanging, Chow would be sentenced to death if found guilty. His case was adjourned to 26 January 2022.

On 16 February 2022, Chow, who was remanded in prison awaiting trial, had completed his psychiatric evaluation. By then, Chow was represented by Shashi Nathan, Jeremy Pereira and Laura Yeo, and the police prosecutor applied for Chow to be brought back to the crime scene to re-enact the murder and assist the police in their investigations.

== Trial of David Brian Chow ==
=== Plea of guilt ===
David Brian Chow
- Born: David Brian Chow Kwok-Hun; 1988 (age 37–38); Singapore
- Occupation: Training company director (former)
- Spouse: Isabel Elizabeth Francis (deceased)
- Children: One unborn daughter Leah (deceased)
- Status: Incarcerated at Changi Prison since 2022
- Motive: To commit suicide and to spare his wife and unborn child from the pain of losing a husband to suicide
- Conviction: Manslaughter
- Criminal charge: Murder
- Penalty: Seven years' imprisonment

On 26 October 2023, 35-year-old David Brian Chow Kwok-Hun was brought to trial at the High Court for killing his pregnant wife. By then, the prosecution, led by Deputy Public Prosecutor (DPP) Jiang Ke-Yue, agreed to reduce the charge of murder to one of culpable homicide not amounting to murder, which was equivalent to manslaughter in Singaporean law, and this allowed Chow to escape the death penalty. Chow had been assessed and found to be suffering from diminished responsibility induced by an adjustment disorder, which caused him to have "catastrophic thinking that he would be bankrupt with no way out and had suicidal thoughts but felt that his death would bring shame to his wife", and it constituted an abnormality of the mind. Chow, represented by veteran lawyer Shashi Nathan, pleaded guilty to the lesser charge before Justice Pang Khang Chau of the High Court. Chow faced a possible sentence of either life imprisonment or up to 20 years' imprisonment, coupled with caning and/or a fine.

=== Sentencing ===
Chow's sentencing hearing took place on the same day he pleaded guilty to the fatal stabbing of his wife. DPP Jiang stated in his submissions that he unreservedly accepted that it was a truly tragic case, but he urged the court to not ignore the aggravating factors of the case, and asked that the tragic circumstances must be balanced by the society's abhorrence of the violence which Chow inflicted on his wife, who was pregnant and also a woman enjoying the prime of her life. DPP Jiang also pointed out that based on the psychiatric report, Chow's impulse control was not impaired, and his actions of stabbing his wife to death were goal-directed, and so DPP Jiang sought a sentence of nine to 12 years' imprisonment.

In mitigation, Shashi Nathan asked for leniency and proposed for a sentence of five to seven years' jail for Chow, arguing that there was no reason for Chow to commit the murder of his wife, whom he deeply loved. Nathan stated that the length of the sentence was not the main point for Chow, but the reality was that Chow would be haunted for the rest of his life with the guilt of murdering his wife and unborn daughter, and this suffering would be tantamount to a life sentence for him. Nathan also stated that Chow, who had lost everything, had strong family support and there was a low likelihood for him to re-offend. Chow reportedly broke down on the stand while his lawyer was making the mitigation plea.

During the sentencing trial, the defence referred to the case of Xavier Yap Jung Houn, who was jailed 14 years for killing his two autistic sons, to support their submissions. Yap was charged with murder in January 2022 for strangling the twins before the charges were reduced to manslaughter (similarly due to diminished responsibility). The defence cited that Yap had premeditated the killing of his twins, unlike Chow, who never planned or premeditated his wife's killing. The prosecution referred to the defence's comparison to the Xavier Yap case, stating that Chow's case also concerned the death of a foetus in contrast to Yap's case, and therefore "some accounting" must be made when calibrating Chow's sentence. Although the trial judge initially pointed that there was no charge proferred against Chow over the death of his unborn daughter, he accepted the prosecution's submission to take into consideration the foetus's death during sentencing.

On the same day, Justice Pang Khang Chau delivered his verdict on Chow's sentence. Justice Pang found that Chow's killing of Francis was not due to animosity, jealousy or any kind of malice towards his wife. He accepted that Chow had done the act out of a desire to spare his wife and daughter from suffering the pain and shame of losing a husband and father, and he also planned to commit suicide. Referring to the 21 character references made by family, friends, colleagues and even business rivals, Justice Pang also agreed that Chow's crime was "totally out of character" and was not premeditated, and the facts showed that Chow had a good relationship with his wife, and that he was unlikely to reoffend.

Justice Pang also found the case of Yap to be a good benchmark, given the two cases shared many similarities. He noted that out of the 14-year sentence he was serving, Yap received seven years for each charge of manslaughter. He also accepted that in Chow's case, an unborn child was lost, but he identified that there was a higher level of planning and premeditation in Yap's case. Having balanced the multiple factors of the case, Justice Pang felt there was no need to "further adjust up or down" from Yap's sentence in deciding on Chow's sentence.

As such, Justice Pang sentenced 35-year-old David Brian Chow to seven years' imprisonment and backdated the sentence to the date of Chow's remand. Chow was allowed to speak to his brother-in-law and other family members after the end of sentencing. The families of both Chow and his late wife, who encouraged each other and never fell out, were present in the courtroom, and Chow's father told reporters that it was a tragedy that had befallen their families and he accepted his son's sentence.

== Aftermath ==
The murder of Isabel Elizabeth Francis was one of six murder cases to happen in Singapore during the year 2022. It was noted that for Francis's murder and three other cases (including the Upper Bukit Timah twin murders), there were family members charged with the murder of their loved ones, which showed an increasing trend of suspects killing people related to them, but a decline in killings committed through random acts of violence. Legal experts analyzed that the possibility for an individual to commit murder could be originated from several compounding factors, including mental conditions, stress and personal circumstances, and there was a greater tendency for a murder to happen within the family as there were higher probabilities to kill, in view of close familial ties and shared living arrangements, not discounting any other relevant compounding factors.

A month after the sentencing of David Brian Chow, Francis's brother Emanuel agreed to be interviewed by the national newspaper The Straits Times to speak about his sister's case. Emanuel stated that he and Francis, whom he addressed as Bel (short for her given name Isabel), shared a close relationship and that both of them relied on financial aid and took part-time jobs to support the family, and also shared the duty of taking care of their oldest sister, who was diagnosed with special needs. He stated that his second sister and Chow were a loving couple and he was glad that she had a good husband, and even maintained regular contact with the couple, with whom he had meals regularly at their flat. Emanuel described his brother-in-law as a "very kind and caring person" who treated his own mother and niece well, and gave the same treatment to everyone else, so he was shocked over the fact that Chow killed his sister. The sight of his sister's corpse with multiple stab wounds at the mortuary, according to Emanuel, was painful for him when he went there to collect her body for cremation. He still regularly visits his sister and her child's niche at the Church of the Holy Spirit columbarium.

Emanuel stated he still remains in contact with Chow's family, but he never spoke to or visited Chow, whom he once considered family, until he came face to face with Chow in court on the date of Chow's conviction. Emanuel, who recalled his sister's concern for Chow's well-being (related to his company issues that Emanuel had heard about), confessed he was hysterical to hear that his sister crawled for her life, full of pain during the stabbing, and he was not prepared to either forgive Chow or forget about the tragedy; all he could say to Chow (who apologized to Emanuel) in court was to tell him they could talk next time. Emanuel stated that he would leave it to time to allow him to accept and find closure. Emanuel also gave his sister's unborn daughter the name Leah, the same name which Francis chose for her child upon her birth, which was estimated to happen on 25 June of the same year the murder occurred. Emanuel stated that throughout the ordeal, his mother did not want to follow the media reports of her daughter's case, and he felt it was for the best since “ignorance is bliss”.

Psychiatric experts were consulted by the media to analyze Francis' killing and the implications of psychiatric disorders behind unlawful violence resulting in death. Dr Steve Lee, an associate consultant at the department of mood and anxiety at the Institute of Mental Health (IMH), explained that adjustment disorder is a psychological condition that occurs when an individual has difficulty coping with stressors or major life changes, which include divorce, financial difficulties, interpersonal conflicts and physical health problems, and this could cause changes in a patient's emotion and behaviour, and in turn the person's daily functioning. Dr Lee explained that with reference to the case of David Brian Chow, it was rare for a person with adjustment disorder to commit murder or resort to violent behaviours, given that most people with the disorder would not turn aggressive and often faced internal distress; the common symptoms were sadness, inability to concentrate and tendency to worry excessively. Dr Lee's analysis of Chow's case was agreed upon by Dr Lim Boon Leng, a psychiatrist at Gleneagles Hospital, who stated it was rare and unusual for someone with the disorder to go to such extremes, but the disorder could be unpredictable, as some mentally ill people could also adopt nihilistic perspectives like extreme pessimism or have impaired rationality.

Dr Brian Yeo, a consultant psychiatrist at Mount Elizabeth Hospital, stated that unlike depression, adjustment disorder is a short-term psychiatric condition that could disappear within six months after the stressor ceased, and it was "milder, short-lived and linked to stress", and Dr Lee added that this disorder could be addressed with appropriate treatment. Another psychiatrist, Dr Geraldine Tan, stated that there was a need to help patients with such disorders to change their thinking process, citing her past case of a National Serviceman who had suicidal tendencies but recovered after his exemption from service and redirecting his focus on future plans like beginning his university studies. Family could also play a part in helping their loved ones affected by the disorder. The psychiatrists noted that Chow's family members did the right thing by reassuring him that his company was doing well and they would provide moral support for him, and Chow's father additionally made an appointment to bring his son to consult a psychiatrist the day of the incident. Dr Lim further said that it was unfortunate that at this point, despite the efforts of Chow's family, the killing of Francis became one of those tragedies that could not be averted, and he stated that it was crucial to make timely interventions to avoid similar tragedies from happening.

== See also ==
- List of major crimes in Singapore
- Greenridge Crescent twin killings
