= IAL =

IAL may refer to:

- Indoleacetaldehyde, an organic compound and metabolite of tryptamine
- Intel Architecture Labs, a research arm of Intel Corporation during the 1990s
- International Advanced Levels, an academic qualification offered by Edexcel
- International Algebraic Language or ALGOL 58
- International Artists' Lodge, a trade union in Germany
- International Association for Lichenology, a scientific organisation
- International auxiliary language, a language for communication between people who do not share a native language
- Institute for Adult Learning, an autonomous institute based in Singapore
- Ial, a commote in medieval Wales
- IAL, an Anatolian high school in Mersin, Turkey
