= Singapore Institute of Management =

Private university in Singapore

Coordinates: 1°19′33″N 103°47′59″E

- 新加坡管理学院 (Chinese); Institut Pengurusan Singapura (Malay) சிங்கப்பூர் நிர்வாகக் கழகம் (Tamil)
- Motto: Learn for Life, Thrive for Life
- Type: Private
- Established: 28 November 1964; 61 years ago
- Chairman: Euleen Goh
- Location: Singapore
- Campus: Urban
- Website: www.sim.edu.sg

The Singapore Institute of Management (SIM) is a private tertiary and lifelong learning institution in Singapore. Founded in 1964, it was established to support the development of managerial and professional manpower during Singapore's early industrialisation period. SIM offers diploma, undergraduate, and postgraduate programmes in partnership with overseas universities, as well as continuing and professional education.

The institute operates primarily through two learning pillars: SIM Global Education and SIM Academy. Over the decades, SIM has played a significant role in private higher education in Singapore, including the establishment of SIM University (UniSIM), which became the Singapore University of Social Sciences (SUSS).

== History ==
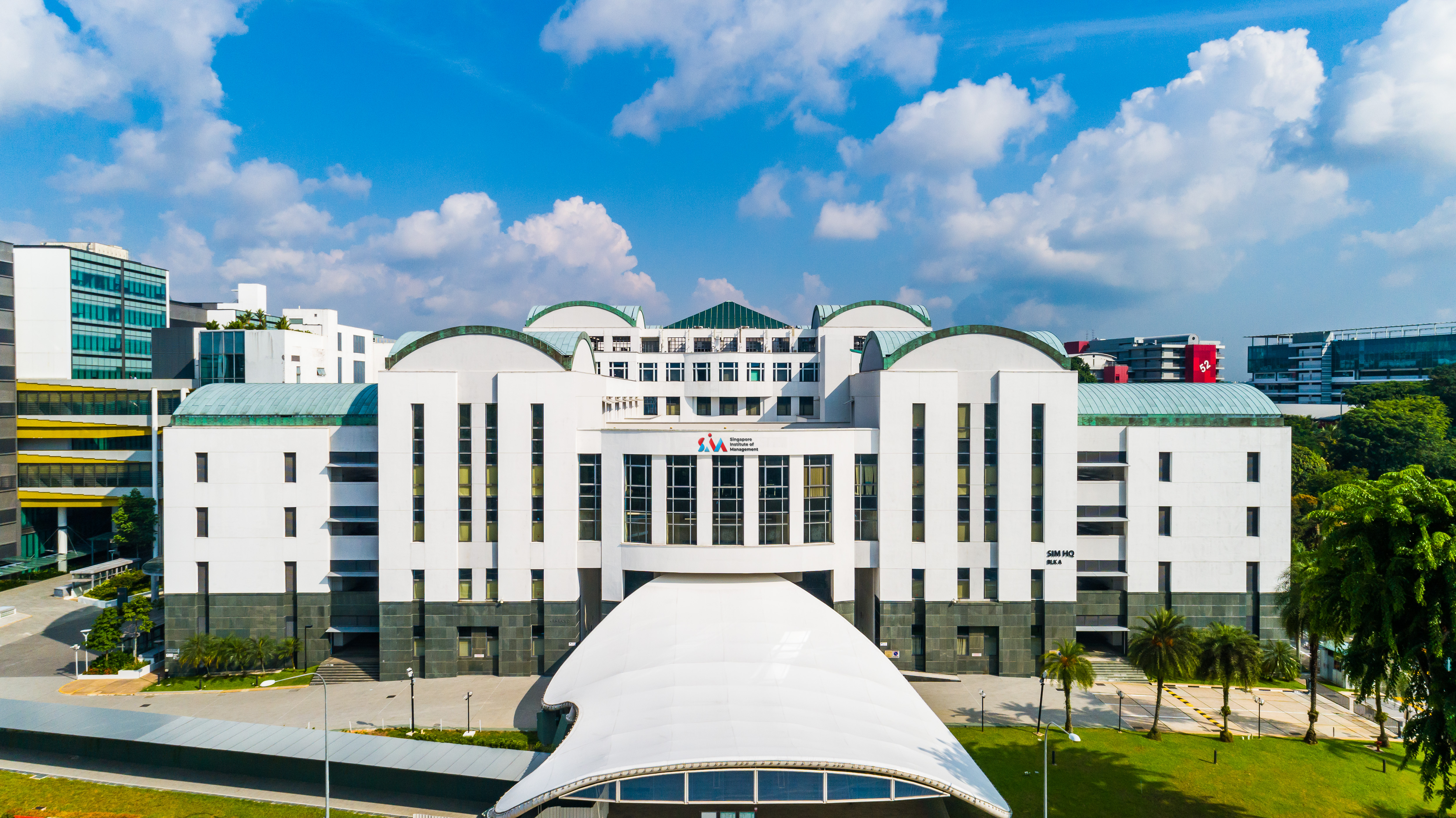
Block A of SIM's main campus at Clementi Road

SIM was founded on 28 November 1964 as a not-for-profit organisation under the Societies Ordinance. Its formation was linked to national efforts to build a pool of trained managers and administrators for Singapore's developing economy. The initiative received seed funding from the Economic Development Board and a grant from the Ford Foundation.

The institute’s first chairman was Richard Eu Keng Mun, while its first executive director was Bill Lim Chew Swee. In its initial years, SIM focused on short executive and management training courses. Its earliest premises were located at South Bridge Road, within the EDB's headquarters. SIM also developed early international links, including a working relationship with Harvard Business School and formal affiliation with the British Institute of Management. By 1966, enrolment had exceeded 700 students.

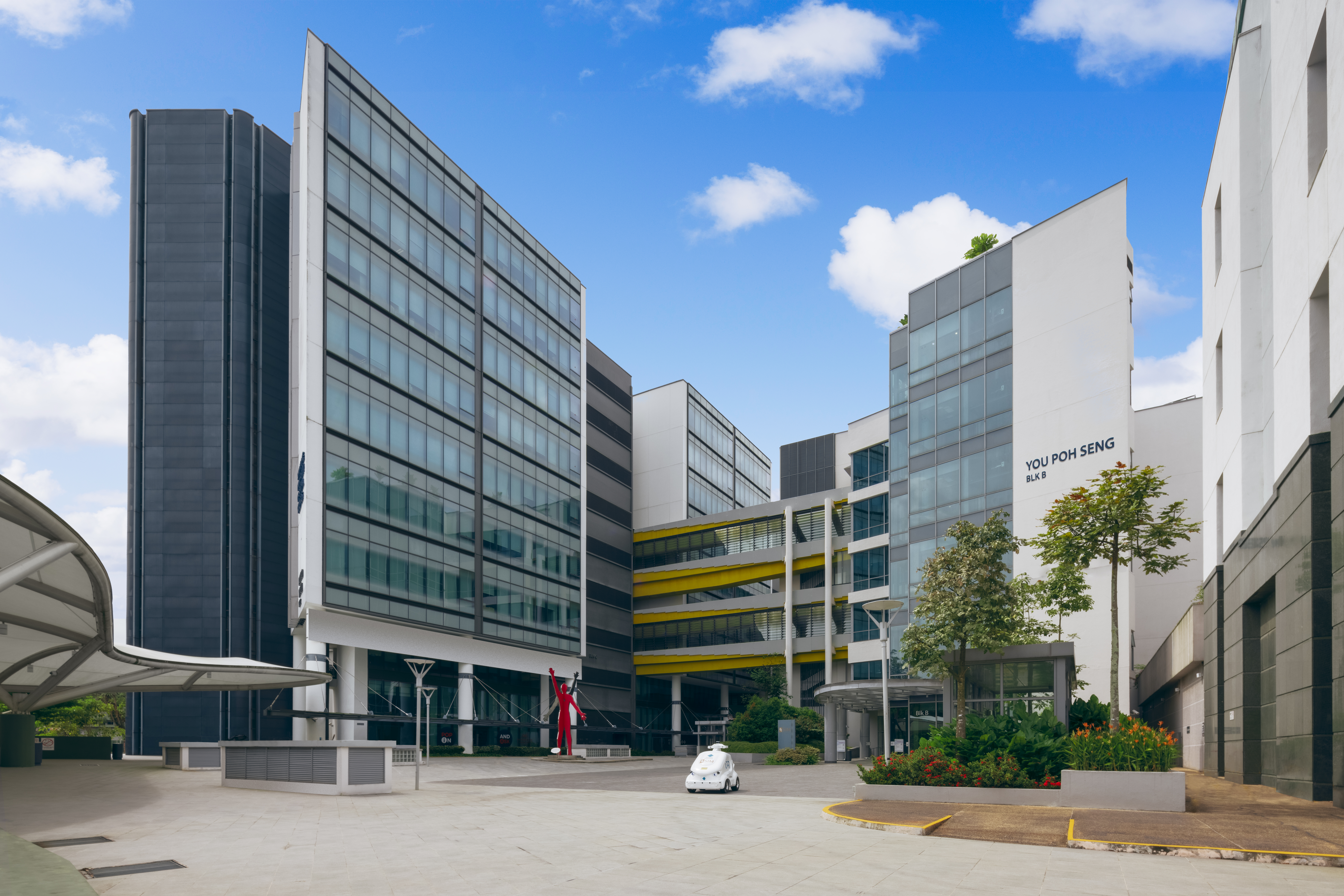
Blocks B and C of the main campus

In 1973, SIM introduced its first Diploma in Management Studies, a two-year part-time programme jointly offered with the University of Singapore, Nanyang University, Singapore Polytechnic, and Ngee Ann Polytechnic. This marked SIM’s transition from short-course training to structured academic programmes. Additional diploma courses in marketing and personnel management were added later in the decade, broadening SIM’s role in adult and professional education. During this period, SIM relocated to several city premises, including Olivetti House and later, Thong Teck Building, as student numbers and programme offerings grew. From the 1980s onwards, SIM expanded into transnational education by collaborating with overseas universities such as Henley Management College, Brunel University, and the University of London to offer foreign-awarded degrees in Singapore. These arrangements enabled students to pursue recognised international qualifications without leaving the country.

In 1988, SIM opened a purpose-built campus at Namly Avenue, marking its first permanent campus facility. SIM also introduced business programmes taught in Mandarin to cater to the needs of Chinese-speaking professionals. By the 1990s, the institute had become one of Singapore’s largest providers of part-time and adult education.

In 2005, SIM established SIM University (UniSIM), Singapore’s first private university dedicated to adult learners. UniSIM offered undergraduate and postgraduate programmes targeted at working adults. In 2017, UniSIM was restructured and became the autonomous Singapore University of Social Sciences (SUSS) under the Ministry of Education. Following this transition, SUSS ceased to be part of the SIM Group.

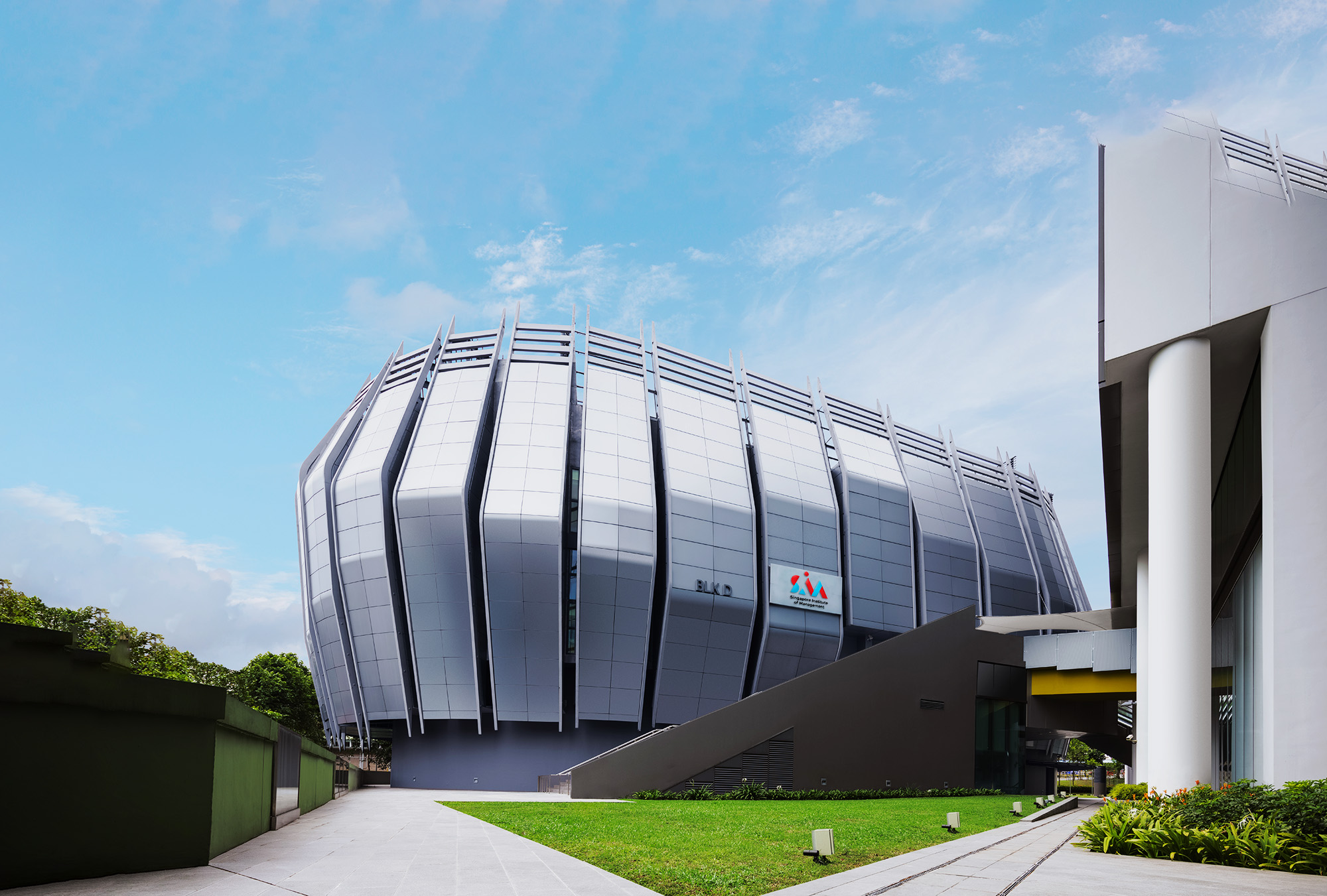
The multi-purpose sports hall at SIM's main campus

In 2018, SIM opened its first representative office in Jakarta. This was followed by the establishment of representative offices in India and Malaysia in 2019, and in China in 2021. These offices provide prospective students and parents with information, advice, and consultation on SIM’s programmes.

In 2022, SIM repositioned itself as a lifelong learning and industry-focused institution. In 2024, it marked its 60th anniversary and announced the launch of the SIM Impact Fund, a S$60 million financial assistance initiative aimed at supporting learners from lower-income backgrounds to improve their employability potential.

== Academics ==
SIM’s learning activities are delivered mainly through two pillars:

- SIM Global Education (SIM GE): Offers diploma, undergraduate and postgraduate degree programmes in partnership with overseas universities. These programmes are delivered in Singapore and are typically based on the curricula of the partner institutions. SIM GE is registered under SkillsFuture Singapore (SSG) and is among the first private education institutions (PEIs) to be registered under SSG's Enhanced Registration Framework (ERF). It has held the EduTrust Certification since May 2010 and was awarded the EduTrust Star award in August 2022, which recognises private education institutions that meet higher standards in academic systems, governance, and educational delivery.
- SIM Academy: Focuses on professional development, executive education and enterprise learning. It provides short courses, certification programmes and customised training for individuals and organisations, particularly in management, leadership and skills development. SIM Academy has obtained Grade 1 of the Training Provider Quality Assessment by SSG.

=== Industry partnership ===
SIM Global Education maintains partnerships with professional bodies, industry organisations, and overseas universities to support student progression and professional development. In 2024, the Institute of Singapore Chartered Accountants announced a collaboration with SIM Global Education to strengthen pathways for students pursuing professional accountancy qualifications. SIM Academy partners with public and private organisations to deliver learning aligned with national or corporate priorities, ensuring professional development is relevant and impactful.

== Campus and facilities ==
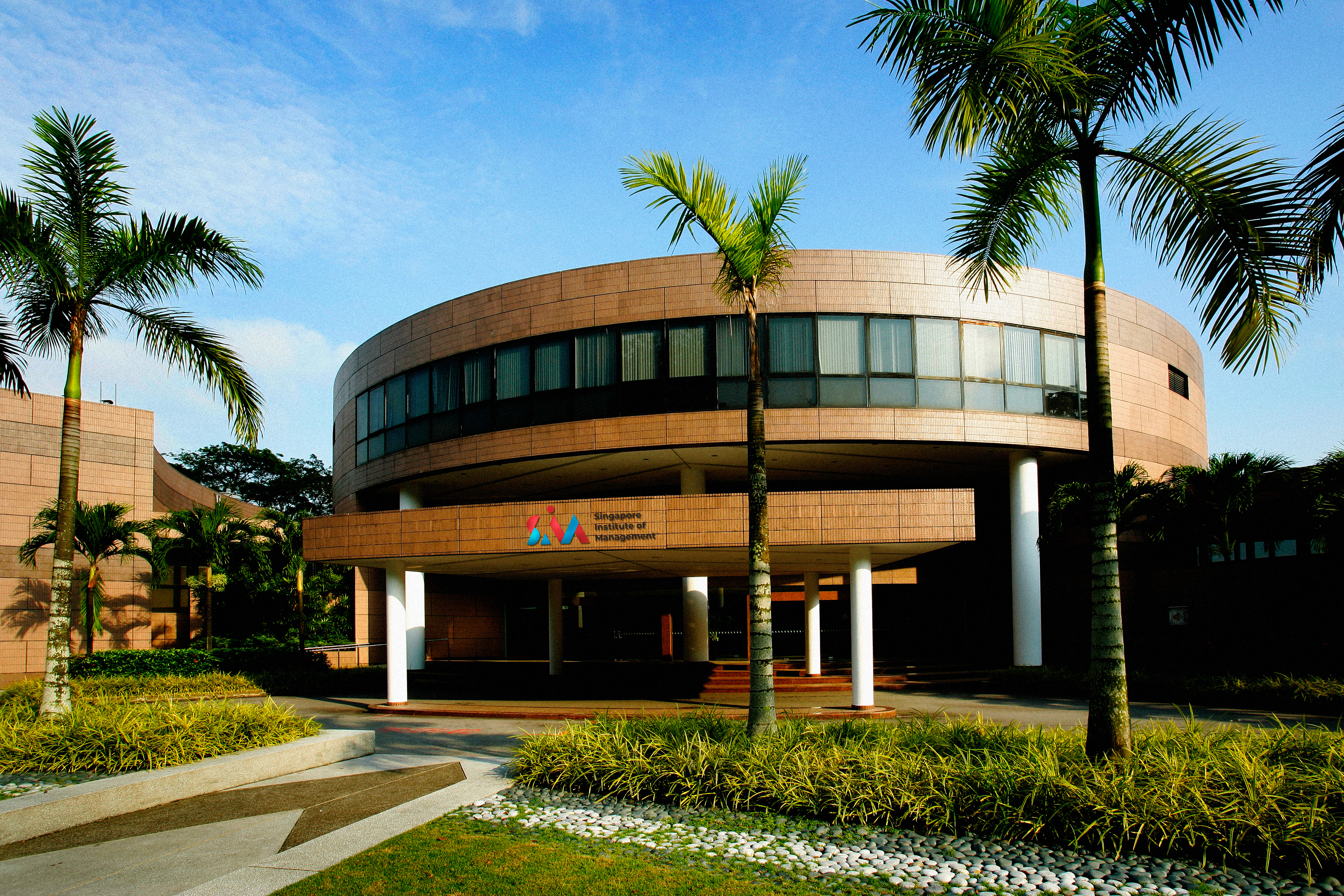
The SIM Management House

SIM has operated across multiple sites throughout its history:

- South Bridge Road (1964 to 1971): SIM’s first location, housed within the EDB building.
- Olivetti House and Thong Teck Building (1971 to 1988): temporary city-centre locations used during SIM’s early expansion.
- SIM Management House (1988 to present): a purpose-built facility at Namly Avenue in the Bukit Timah area, housing lecture theatres and professional training facilities.
- SIM Campus (1998 to present): SIM’s main campus at Clementi Road, often referred to as its headquarters. Completed in 1998 and officially opened in 2001, the campus includes teaching blocks, library, sports facilities, performance spaces, and student amenities.
