= Singapore University of Social Sciences School of Law =

Law school in Singapore

- Sekolah Undang-undang Universiti Sains Kemasyarakatan Singapura (Malay) 新加坡新跃社科大学法学院 (Chinese)
- Type: Law school
- Established: January 2017; 9 years ago
- Parent institution: Singapore University of Social Sciences
- Dean: Leslie Chew, SC
- Location: 463 Clementi Road, Singapore 599494; 1°19′45″N 103°46′35″E
- Campus: Suburban; Clementi Campus
- Colours: Orange
- Website: www.suss.edu.sg/academics/schools-college/school-of-law

The Singapore University of Social Sciences School of Law (SUSS Law) is an autonomous law school of Singapore University of Social Sciences. It was established in 2017, as Singapore's third law school after the NUS Faculty of Law and the SMU School of Law. The school was established to address the shortage of practitioners in family and criminal law. In 2018, it was reported that of the 60 pioneer SUSS law students, seven have either dropped out or deferred their studies setting the attrition rate at 10%.

The school offers a 4.5 to 6 years undergraduate Bachelor of Laws (LLB) degree programme, and a 4 to 6 years graduate Juris Doctor (JD) programme. The school also offers the Master of Taxation (MTax) programme in collaboration with the Tax Academy of Singapore (TA).

For entry to its LLB or JD programmes, prospective students must have taken The Law National Aptitude Test (LNAT) conducted in the relevant year of application. They must also go through an interview conducted by the SUSS School of Law and submit an essay—written under supervision during the admissions process. There is no minimum LNAT score to be eligible for admission into the LLB or JD programmes but a demonstration of aptitude to practice law must be shown.

== History ==
In June 2013, Senior Minister of State for Law, and Education Indranee Rajah initiated to fill the shortage of family and criminal lawyers from mid-career professionals through the third law school. SIM University (UniSIM) before it was restructured into the Singapore University of Social Sciences (SUSS) and the Singapore Institute of Technology (SIT) were among the institutions shortlisted to house the third law school.

In October 2013, Minister for Education Heng Swee Keat announced during UniSIM's convocation that the university was selected to house the third law school due to its track record of offering degree programmes for working adults and current offerings in humanities and the social sciences Subsequently, Minister for Law K. Shanmugam clarified that students in the third law school will be trained holistically and not restricted to family and criminal Law only. Eventually, most of the graduates will pursue family and criminal law. It is also not fair to name the school as second class.

In November 2013, the Ministry of Law (MinLaw) setup the 12-member steering committee to guide the development of the UniSIM law school. The committee was chaired by Senior Minister of State for Law, and Education Indranee Rajah, and composed of legal experts such as renowned criminal lawyer Subhas Anandan, chief prosecutor Tai Wei Shyong, chief district dudge See Kee Oon, and Mr Noor Marican. Other members include Valerie Thean, Cheong Hee Kiat, Raja Kumar s/o Thamny Rajah, Amarjeet Singh, Foo Siew Fong and Narayanan Sreenivasan.

In February 2016, MinLaw announced that 50 to 60 places were offered to the law school's first intake for January 2017. 80 per cent of the intake will be allocated for mature students and the remaining for fresh school leavers. Students have to complete the course curriculum that is modular and credit based. The programme is practice-oriented, multidisciplinary and focus on applied research. Admission into the programme is based on academic credentials, aptitude, attitude and interest to pursue family and criminal law. There will be offerings in Bachelor of Laws (LLB) and Juris Doctor (JD) programmes.

The school intends to eventually locate in the State and or Family Justice Courts to conduct practical learning.

Despite previous recommendations from the steering committee to conduct conversion course for law graduates with external law degrees not on the list of approved overseas institutions to become full-fledged lawyers, this concluded with the course not being offered.

In October 2016, UniSIM informed that the law school has filled all 60 places for its two law programmes, from close to 400 applications. The school accepted 27 applicants for its LLB programme, and 33 for the JD programme.

In January 2017, SUSS School of Law started with an initial intake of 60 students.

The yearly intake is 75 students for all LLB and JD students combined. Most of the intake are working adults who wish to make a mid-career switch to become lawyers specialising in family law or criminal law.

== Eligibility to sit for Part B of the Singapore Bar Examinations ==
Students who wish to be eligible to sit for Part B of the Singapore Bar Examinations conducted by the Singapore Institute of Legal Education must also obtain a CGPA of least 3.5 (out of a maximum of 5) for their LLB or JD programmes.
