= Punggol Field murder =

2020 murder of a jogger in Singapore

- Date: 10 May 2020; 6 years ago
- Location: Punggol, Singapore
- Motive: To release resentment and anger over father's abandonment of his family 21 years before date of crime
- Deaths: Tay Rui Hao
- Suspects: Surajsrikan Diwakar Mani Tripathi

On 10 May 2020, 38-year-old assistant manager Tay Rui Hao (Chinese: 郑锐豪; pinyin: Zhèng Ruìháo) was attacked by another person while he was jogging in the night along Punggol Field. Tay, who sustained multiple stab wounds, was able to call an ambulance, but he died at Sengkang General Hospital. The police investigations led to the arrest of 20-year-old Surajsrikan Diwakar Mani Tripathi. Surajsrikan was charged with murder a week after killing Tay; his motive was allegedly negative emotions he harboured over his father abandoning his family 21 years before, on the same date he killed Tay.

Although Surajsrikan was assessed to have borderline intelligence, a mathematical learning disability, severe social anxiety disorder and obsessive-compulsive disorder (the latter two disorders possibly contributing to a tendency to have low moods and anger), Surajsrikan's condition was considered not severe enough to serve as an abnormality of the mind and he was mentally fit to stand trial. Following a guilty plea, Surajsrikan was convicted of murder and sentenced to life imprisonment and 15 strokes of the cane. Tay's killing also prompted the government to pass laws to facilitate the collection of TraceTogether data for the purpose of police investigations in serious crimes, including murder.

== Case and investigations ==
=== Death of Tay Rui Hao ===
On 10 May 2020, the hospital authorities received a call from a man stating that he was attacked and stabbed at Punggol Field. The man, who sustained a total of ten injuries (including six knife wounds), was helped by a resident living in one of the nearby flats, and he was subsequently rushed to Sengkang General Hospital, but the man succumbed to his injuries. The cause of his death were two fatal knife wounds, consisting of one chest wound that collapsed his right lung and a knife wound that cut through the radial artery on his right forearm.

The man was identified as 38-year-old Tay Rui Hao, an assistant manager of a sportswear store. Tay was described as an easygoing and talkative person, and was also a good son, brother and husband, as well as a good mentor and colleague at his workplace. He was reported to have started jogging two to three times a week since the COVID-19 circuit breaker lockdown in April until his death in May. Tay's father stated that the family was shocked to hear about his stabbing and they arrived too late to see him one last time before his death. Tay's father said that the last time he heard from his son was earlier in the day when Tay told him he wanted to jog after feeling cooped up at home due to the lockdown, hours before his murder. He described his son's death as an injustice and sought the assistance of the public to catch the perpetrator of his son's killing. Sun Xueling, who was the Member of Parliament (MP) for Pasir Ris-Punggol GRC, appealed to the public through Facebook for information relating to the case and reassured residents in the midst of the public's shock over the case.

=== Capture of the suspect ===
The police investigations began after taking over the case of Tay Rui Hao's death. They managed to discover a possible suspect after monitoring the police CCTV cameras of the nearby areas around the crime scene, where a man was shown wandering around the neighbourhood with a knife. The suspect, identified as 20-year-old Surajsrikan Diwakar Mani Tripathi (who was unemployed), was arrested four days later on 16 May 2020. He was charged with murder a day later, and as murder warrants the death penalty, Surajsrikan faced the possibility of execution if found guilty in accordance with Singapore law. Surajsrikan and Tay were not known to each other despite both being residents of Punggol.

The police managed to find Tay's DNA and blood on the knife despite it being cleaned by Surajsrikan after the crime. His shoes were also taken for DNA swab testing, and Tay's DNA was also found on them. This discovery further cemented Surajsrikan's status as a suspect. Soon after he was charged, Surajsrikan was ordered to undergo a three-week psychiatric evaluation to assess if he was fit to stand trial, and he was also brought back to the crime scene to assist in investigations and re-enact the crime.

== Background of the convict ==
=== Personal life before crime ===
Surajsrikan s/o Diwakar Mani Tripathi
- Born: c. 2000; Singapore
- Status: Incarcerated at Changi Prison since May 2020
- Conviction: Murder (1 count)
- Penalty: Life imprisonment and 15 strokes of the cane (15 September 2022)

Details
- Victims: 1
- Date: 10 May 2020
- Country: Singapore
- Date apprehended: 16 May 2020

Surajsrikan Diwakar Mani Tripathi was born in 2000. His father abandoned his mother on 10 May 1999, two months after their arranged marriage; his mother was pregnant with him at the time. This abandonment by his father made an adverse impact on Surajsrikan's life, as the date of 10 May made Surajsrikan constantly remember it as a painful reminder of his father's abandonment.

Surajsrikan only studied up to primary school level before dropping out of Northlight School. He enlisted in National Service on 10 May 2018. The date of Surajsrikan's enlistment aggravated the pain and torment he felt over his father's treachery. A short period of time after his enlistment, Surajsrikan's behavioral problems became worse, resulting in him being medically downgraded, and he was later discharged early from the Singapore Armed Forces (SAF).

According to his family, Surajsrikan and his family were normally harmonious, but there would be arguments occasionally, and he also assaulted his siblings. As influenced by his psychiatric conditions, Surajsrikan has anxiety about crowds or being in the company of people, so he kept very much to himself, and also could not stand noises. Surajsrikan's mother also revealed her son had several mental problems when she was interviewed by the media upon his arrest.

=== Criminal motive ===
On the night of 10 May 2020, exactly 21 years after his father abandoned his family, Surajsrikan decided to go out for a jog at Punggol Field, and he also brought along his foldable army knife and wet wipes. According to his lawyer, Edmond Pereira, Surajsrikan took the knife with the intention to hurt himself, as he was overwhelmed with the emotional scars caused by his father's abandonment. Surajsrikan jogged for about five to ten minutes before he accidentally tripped and fell down. This caused him to stop at a bus stop to try to ease his anger.

At around 11 PM, Surajsrikan saw 38-year-old Tay Rui Hao, whom he had never met before, jogging past him. The sight of Tay led to Surajsrikan giving in to his emotions, and he decided to attack Tay; he began giving chase. Upon catching up with Tay, Surajsrikan attacked him from behind with the knife, and slashed and stabbed Tay several times. After the attack, Surajsrikan fled the scene and later wandered around for a while. He did not call the police or an ambulance. Surajsrikan returned home at around midnight to clean the foldable knife with hand soap and stayed indoors for the next six days before his arrest.

=== Remand period and psychiatric report ===
While he was under remand undergoing psychiatric assessments, Surajsrikan was found to suffer from severe social anxiety disorder and obsessive-compulsive disorder, both disorders which could cause him to have a greater tendency towards low moods and anger problems, but these disorders were not severe enough to show that Surajsrikan suffered from diminished responsibility at the time of the offence. He was previously found to have borderline to low intelligence but was not found to be intellectually disabled, nor suffering from any psychotic disorder. Surajsrikan was also diagnosed with dyscalculia, a learning disability in mathematics. The report also concluded that the significance of the date exacerbated Surajsrikan's chronic feelings of anger and was the primary psychological driver for his actions.

During the period of his remand, Surajsrikan was detained in a single-man cell at Changi Prison due to his social anxiety disorder, and was prescribed medication for his disorders.

== Murder trial and sentencing ==
On 15 September 2022, during the first day of his trial at the High Court, 22-year-old Surajsrikan Diwakar Mani Tripathi told the court that he decided to plead guilty to committing murder by intentionally causing the fatal injury to the victim. In accordance with the guilty plea, Surajsrikan was found guilty and convicted by Justice Dedar Singh Gill. This murder charge, unlike the most serious degree of murder with intention to kill, also carries the alternate punishment of life imprisonment with mandatory caning other than death.

The prosecutors in charge of Surajsrikan's trial - Andre Chong and Han Ming Kuang - submitted to the court that they did not object to a life term in Surajsrikan's case, but they argued that should Surajsrikan be spared the death penalty and sentenced for life instead, he should also be given the maximum of 24 strokes of the cane, in view of the aggravating factors of the case. They highlighted that the defendant had premeditated the attack by bringing a knife and wet wipes, and senselessly committed the murder just to let out his anger and despair over his personal troubles, and in a brutal manner through repeated stabbing. The prosecution pointed out that Surajsrikan targeted a stranger and showed a lack of remorse for his crime based on his post-killing behavior, for which his actions caused considerable public disquiet and thus he deserved the maximum number of strokes.

On the other hand, Surajsrikan's lawyer Edmond Pereira (who formerly represented British serial killer John Martin Scripps in his 1995 Singapore murder trial) sought a life sentence in Surajsrikan's case, but he urged the court to not impose caning, or at least impose a lower number of strokes of caning for Surajsrikan. Pereira highlighted that the knife brought by Surajsrikan was not meant for committing any offence but merely to hurt himself, and he had not thought about targeting anyone in particular. Pereira conceded to the prosecution's emphasis on the cruelty and viciousness of the crime, but stated his client regretted his actions and both Surajsrikan's family and Surajsrikan himself grieved the plight of the victim and his family.

Having heard the submissions, Justice Gill decided to sentence Surajsrikan to serve a single term of life imprisonment, and also ordered the defendant to receive 15 strokes of the cane. Justice Gill stated that although the sentence would not bring Tay back to life or "erase memories of this painful episode", he hoped that it would "provide some sort of closure" to Tay’s bereaved family. The judge also hoped that the sentence would allow Surajsrikan to continue treatment for his psychiatric disorders while in prison.

When Tay's father heard about Surajsrikan's life sentence, he revealed in a Chinese newspaper that the family still struggled with sadness over his son's murder, and he would have considered appealing for a heavier sentence if the families of victims had the legal option to appeal against the defendant's sentence. Tay's father stated that he was unable to come to court to hear the verdict as both he and his wife needed to remain home to take care of his daughter, who was sick, and Tay's family still missed him and kept the family photos containing Tay.

== Impact of case ==
=== Before sentencing ===
A year after the Punggol field murder case, the Parliament decided to pass laws to legalize the police's ability to obtain data from TraceTogether, a tracing app launched to detect possible infectees of COVID-19 in Singapore, for the purpose of criminal investigations, including murder. Part of this was influenced by the police's attempt to use the TraceTogether data of the suspect to trace his whereabouts in order to arrest him, but this hindered the investigations as Surajsrikan did not download the app in his phone, and he also did not have a TraceTogether token, given that the tokens (which were mainly provided for the elderly and young children who did not have smartphones) were not yet launched and issued as of the time Surajsrikan murdered Tay.

The move to pass these new laws caused a public outcry, as some questioned the possible invasion of privacy through the police's access to every user's personal data on TraceTogether. Several members of the opposition, like Progress Singapore Party member Leong Mun Wai and Workers' Party chairman Pritam Singh, objected to the police's access to users' personal data on TraceTogether out of concern for the potential breach of public trust in the government, due to the Government having made re-assurances that this data would be used to detect potential cases of COVID-19 infection during the early period of launching TraceTogether. Minister for Foreign Affairs Vivian Balakrishnan, who first proposed the law, later apologized and rectified the law to authorize the police in gaining access to TraceTogether data when conducting investigations into serious crimes, including murder. After the changes were made, the law was finalized and passed on 2 February 2021.

=== After sentencing ===
On 23 September 2022, a week after Surajsrikan's sentencing, with regards to the public probe about why Surajsrikan was sentenced to lifetime imprisonment despite the fact that murder carries the death penalty in Singapore, the newspaper CNA released an exclusive article, in which several lawyers explained during separate interviews about why life imprisonment was imposed on several murderers while the death penalty was received in other cases. The lawyers - Johannes Hadi, Meenakshi and Tania Chin - stated that based on the landmark case of Kho Jabing, a Malaysian who was hanged in 2016 for murdering Cao Ruyin during an armed robbery, the Court of Appeal, in overturning Kho's life term and imposing a death sentence a second time on Kho, laid out sentencing guidelines, which they highlighted that the death penalty for murder by fatal injury (but no intention to kill) should only be imposed in cases where an offender's conduct was vicious and demonstrated a blatant disregard for human life, as well as sparking an outrage of the community's feelings. The factors taken into consideration by judges to determine the extent of disregard for human life were mainly the mental state of the offender at the time of the attack, his role or participation in the attack, and his age and intelligence.

Turning to the case of the Punggol Field murder, one of the lawyers, Hadi, said that Surajsrikan's multiple mental disorders, low intellect, absence of criminal records and his relatively young age of 20 may have been relevant considerations made by the trial judge, Dedar Singh Gill, during sentencing. The prosecution also had the authority to decide whether or not to pursue a charge of intentional murder, which guaranteed the mandatory death penalty, and also to decide whether they should seek the death penalty or life imprisonment in an offender's case based on the aggravating and mitigating factors of the case.

On 1 January 2023, it was noted that there were six cases of people charged with murder in the year 2022 itself, including Xavier Yap Jung Houn, who allegedly murdered his autistic twin sons Aston Yap Kai Shern and Ethan Yap E Chern at Upper Bukit Timah, and these cases showed an increasing trend of suspects killing people related to them, but a decline in killings committed through random acts of violence; the Punggol Field murder was noted to be one of the high profile cases that involved a murder resulting from random violence. Legal experts analyzed that one's potential to commit murder may arise from several compounding factors, including mental conditions, stress and personal circumstances, and it was more plausible for a murder to happen within the family due to the opportunity to strike is greater when there are close familial ties and shared living arrangements, in addition to any relevant compounding factors.

== See also ==
- Capital punishment in Singapore
- Life imprisonment in Singapore
- Caning in Singapore
- List of major crimes in Singapore
