= Leslie Chew =

Singaporean legal academic

Leslie Chew Kwee Hoe SC
- Education: National University of Singapore
- Occupations: Dean, School of Law
- Employer: Singapore University of Social Sciences

Leslie Chew Kwee Hoe SC PBM is a Singaporean legal academic and law professor. He is the founding Dean of the School of Law, Singapore University of Social Sciences, Singapore's third law school. He also regularly teaches in other institutions including the Singapore Institute of Arbitrators and the NUS Faculty of Law, as well as the Lee Kwan Yew School of Public Policy. Chew is the founding President of the Asia Pacific Institute of Experts.

Apart from being a law academic, Chew is also a consultant at Peter Low Chambers.

== Career ==
Chew was appointed Senior Counsel in 2000.

In 2002, Chew was awarded the Public Service Medal by the President of the Republic of Singapore for his contributions to the Military Court of Appeal.

Chew started his legal career as a legal service officer from 1978 to 1981 before leaving for private practice, first serving in Lee & Lim before joining KhattarWong & Partners where he became Joint Managing Partner. He then joined Gurbani & Co. From 2007 to 2014, Chew was a District Judge and subsequently a Senior District Judge heading the Civil Justice Division of the State Courts (previously known as the Subordinate Courts). After a distinguished career on the Bench, Chew retired in 2014. Chew credits the former Registrar of the Supreme Court of Singapore, Mr Chiam Boon Keng, and Mr Sat Pal Khattar, as being major influences in his career.

In 2016, Chew was appointed the founding Dean of the School of Law, Singapore University of Social Sciences. In that capacity, he has spoken about the need to strengthen the values inherent in the legal profession.

Chew has also published a book on arbitration, entitled "Introduction to the Law and Practice of Arbitration in Singapore".
