= Institute for Adult Learning =

Educational institute in Singapore

Institute for Adult Learning Singapore
- Type: Adult education School
- Established: 2008
- Parent institution: Singapore University of Social Sciences
- Chairman: Mr Tan Kok Yam
- Director: Associate Professor (Practice) Terence Ho
- Location: Singapore
- Language: English
- Website: www.ial.edu.sg

Institute for Adult Learning Singapore (IAL) is the Training and Adult Education autonomous institute within the Singapore University of Social Sciences (SUSS). It was established in 2008. IAL offers a range of education programmes such as Master's degree, WSQ Diploma, WSQ Advanced Certificate, and short courses in the field of training and adult education. IAL functions as the National Centre of Excellence for Adult Learning that aims to enhance the standards of Training and Adult Education (TAE) in Singapore by promoting ongoing education and partnering with higher education institutions and training providers. IAL engages in research to guide continuous education policies and practices, and aids in applying this research to develop practical tools and resources for the TAE community. Additionally, IAL contributes to the National Centre of Excellence for Workplace Learning (NACE) network, particularly through NACE@IAL, focusing on improving workplace learning theories and practices, as well as fostering innovation and technology within the TAE sector.

== History ==
IAL was established in 2008 to provide training for adult educators and undertake research in adult learning.

From 1 April 2019, IAL was restructured into an autonomous institute within Singapore University of Social Sciences (SUSS).

On 11 January 2023, IAL has signed MoUs with Microsoft and SNEC to guide digital learning material design and enhance continuing education and training and ophthalmic healthcare skills. From 13 March 2023, Associate Professor (Practice) Yeo Li Pheow succeeded Professor Lee Wing On as IAL Executive Director. On 20 October 2023, IAL has partnered with Agency for Integrated Care, Home Team Academy, and Kydon Holdings, enhancing the learning ecosystem through professional development, digital transformation, and creating effective learning materials across sectors.

== Programmes ==
The Institute for Adult Learning (IAL) offers a variety of educational programs, including the WSQ Advanced Certificate in Learning and Performance (ACLP), the WSQ Workplace Learning Facilitator (WLF), the WSQ Diploma in Design and Development of Learning for Performance (DDDLP) and the Master in Boundary-Crossing Learning and Leadership (MBX).

== Adult Education Professionalisation (AEP) & Training and Adult Educator Professional Pathway (TAEPP) ==
In 2014, the Adult Education Professionalisation (AEP) was launched by IAL. There are three levels of AEP namely Associate Adult Educators (AAE), Specialist Adult Educators (SAE) with either Curriculum Development or Facilitation track or Adult Education Fellows (AEF).

The Training and Adult Educator Professional Pathway (TAEPP) is the national professional framework in Singapore launched in April 2026 for the development and professionalisation of Adult Educators in the Training and Adult Education sector. Developed by IAL with the support of Skills & Worforce Development Agency, TAEPP provides a structured pathway for Adult Educators to develop their professional capabilities. The framework includes the National Adult Educator Registry.

== See also ==
- Singapore University of Social Sciences
- Adult education
- Training and development
