= Singapore University of Social Sciences =

University in Singapore

- Universiti Sains Kemasyarakatan Singapura (Malay) 新加坡社科大学 (Chinese) சிங்கப்பூர் சமூக அறிவியல் பல்கலைக்கழகம் (Tamil)
- Former name: SIM University
- Type: Autonomous university
- Established: 2005; 21 years ago (as SIM University); 2017; 9 years ago (as the Singapore University of Social Sciences)
- Endowment: S$416.57 million
- Chancellor: Halimah Yacob
- President: Tan Tai Yong
- Provost: Robbie Goh
- Faculty: 270+ full-time faculty and 1,400+ associate faculty.
- Students: 19,000
- Location: 463 Clementi Rd, Singapore 599494, 463 Clementi Road, Singapore 599494, Singapore; 1°19′45″N 103°46′35″E
- Campus: 9.2 hectares
- Colours: Red; Blue
- Website: suss.edu.sg

The Singapore University of Social Sciences (SUSS) is a public autonomous university in Singapore. Established in 2017 through the restructuring of SIM University, SUSS focuses on applied degree programmes primarily in the social sciences.

SUSS offers undergraduate and graduate programmes through six academic schools. Its continuing education offerings are delivered through SUSS Academy, while the Institute for Adult Learning (IAL) operates as an autonomous institute within SUSS.

The Patron of SUSS is Singapore President Tharman Shanmugaratnam, the Chancellor is Halimah Yacob, and the Pro-Chancellors are Edmund Cheng and Loo Choon Yong. Key academic leaders include President Professor Tan Tai Yong and Provost Professor Robbie Goh.

The university is located at 463 Clementi Road. SUSS also uses external premises to conduct lessons.

== History ==
=== SIM University (2005–2017) ===
In 2005, SIM University (UniSIM) was established as a private university under the Singapore Institute of Management Group (SIM). Cham Tao Soon became the first chancellor and chairman.

On 12 October 2016, Acting Minister for Education (Higher Education and Skills) Ong Ye Kung announced that the government invited UniSIM to become Singapore's sixth autonomous university. On 11 November 2016, the SIM governing council voted to bring the university under the ambit of the Ministry of Education (MOE).

In 2017, UniSIM was restructured as the Singapore University of Social Sciences (SUSS) and ceased to be a member of the SIM Group. SUSS became Singapore's sixth autonomous university under MOE.

=== Establishment (2017–) ===
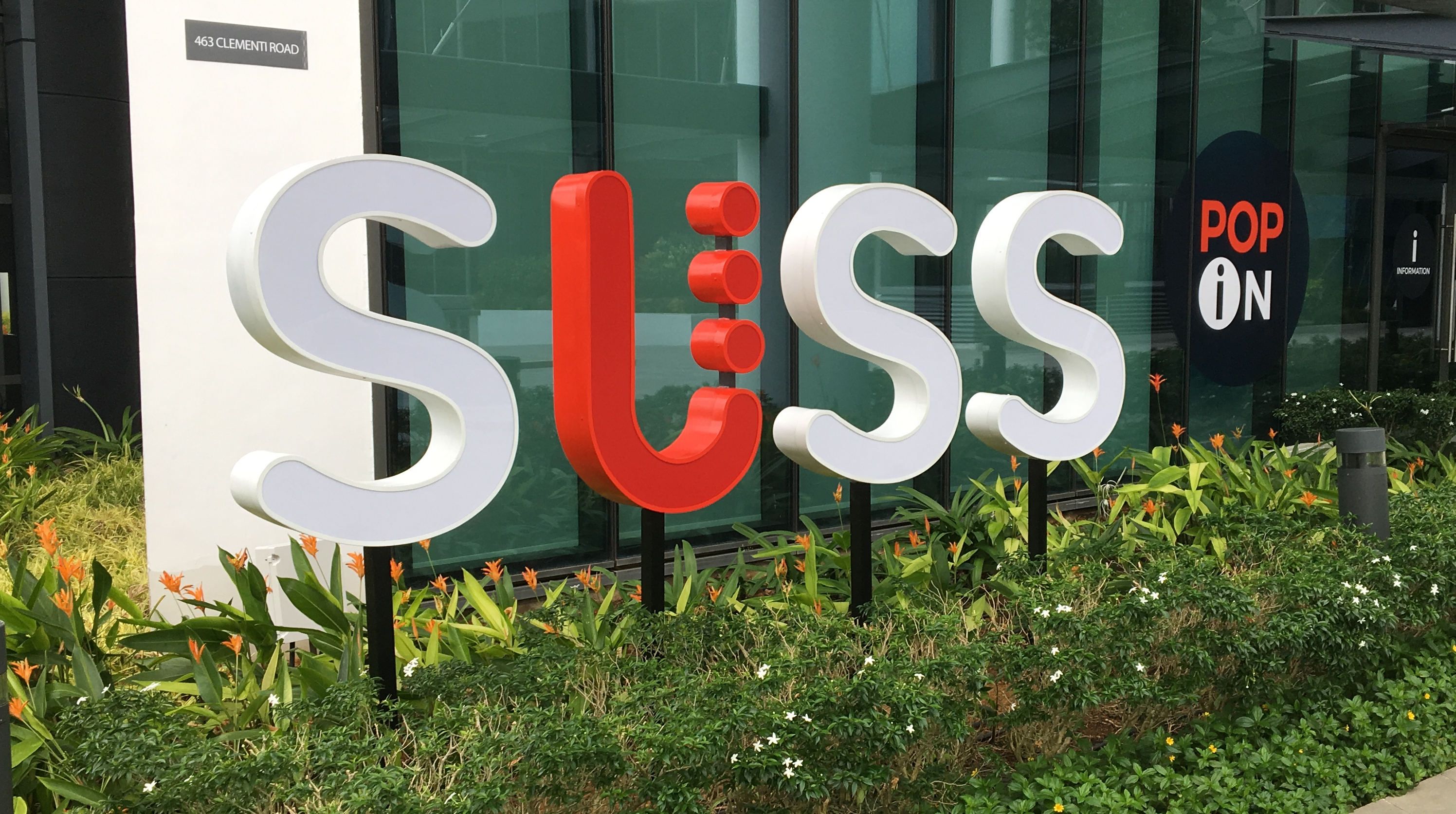
SUSS logo

On 17 March 2017, SIM University was renamed Singapore University of Social Sciences (SUSS) and brought under the ambit of the Ministry of Education (MOE).

Ong moved a bill in Parliament to confer autonomous status on SUSS. SUSS was officially granted autonomous status on 11 July 2017.

In 2017, SUSS conducted an exercise to issue replacement certificates to those who held UniSIM certificates, with a statement indicating that the qualification was conferred under the former name. SUSS held its first graduation ceremony as an autonomous university in October 2017, conferring 2,137 degrees.

The university reduced its offerings in business and engineering programmes while expanding programmes in the social sciences. All programmes include a compulsory social sciences module.

On 1 April 2019, the Institute for Adult Learning (IAL) was restructured as an autonomous institute within SUSS. The two institutions collaborate on course design, development, and teaching. SUSS accredits and issues qualifications for tertiary programmes run by IAL.

In January 2024, SUSS changed its Chinese name from 新加坡新跃社科大学 to 新加坡社科大学.

In 2025, the government announced that SUSS will relocate to the site of the former Rochor Centre.

== Academic structure and programmes ==
=== Academic schools ===
Schools
School	Founded
S R Nathan School of Human Development	2018
School of Business	2018
School of Humanities and Behavioural Sciences	2018
School of Law	2018
School of Science and Technology	–
School of Social Work and Social Development	2025

SUSS offers programmes through six academic schools.

==== S R Nathan School of Human Development ====
In 2018, the School of Human Development and Social Services was renamed the S R Nathan School of Human Development (NSHD) in honour of Singapore's sixth president, S. R. Nathan.

The school offers programmes in Counselling, Early Childhood Education, Human Resource Management, Social Work, and Gerontology (postgraduate only).

==== School of Business ====
SUSS School of Business (SBIZ) offers programmes in business and management. The Bachelor of Accountancy is accredited by the Accounting and Corporate Regulatory Authority (ACRA) and Institute of Singapore Chartered Accountants (ISCA), qualifying graduates for direct entry into the Singapore CA Qualification's professional programme.

==== School of Humanities and Behavioural Sciences ====
SUSS School of Humanities and Behavioural Sciences (SHBS) offers programmes in translation and interpretation, including professional interpreter certification. The school was renamed from School of Arts and Social Sciences (SASS) in 2018.

==== School of Law ====
In January 2017, SUSS School of Law admitted its first cohort of 60 students to its LLB and JD programmes. Both the Bachelor of Laws (LLB) and Juris Doctor (JD) are recognised under the Singapore Legal Profession Act; graduates with a minimum GPA of 3.5 are eligible to sit for the Bar Examination. The school also offers a Master of Taxation in collaboration with the Tax Academy of Singapore.

==== School of Science and Technology ====
SUSS School of Science and Technology offers programmes in Aerospace Systems, Biomedical Engineering, Built Environment, Electronics Engineering, Military Studies, and Technology. The Bachelor of Building and Project Management is accredited by the Singapore Institute of Surveyors and Valuers (SISV) and Royal Institution of Chartered Surveyors (RICS). The BSc Facilities and Events Management is accredited by the International Facilities Management Association (IFMA) and RICS. The BEng Aerospace Systems and BEng Electronics are accredited by the Engineering Accreditation Board (EAB) of the Institution of Engineers Singapore (IES).

==== School of Social Work and Social Development ====
The School of Social Work & Social Development (SSWSD) was established on 4 September 2025. It offers the Bachelor of Social Work (full-time and part-time), Graduate Diploma in Social Work (part-time), and Master in Social Work (part-time).

=== Programme types ===
SUSS offers full-time undergraduate programmes leading to a direct honours degree, and part-time undergraduate programmes that lead to either a basic degree or an honours degree. Programmes offer Professional Majors and several Major-Minor combinations.

In May 2017, SUSS partnered with all five polytechnics to offer the SkillsFuture Work-Study Post-Diploma (WSPostDip) programme, an articulation pathway allowing polytechnic graduates to pursue part-time undergraduate degrees alongside on-the-job training.

SUSS also offers graduate certificates, graduate diplomas, master's degrees, and doctoral degrees. The SkillsFuture Career Transition Programme offers courses for adults changing industries or job roles.

== College of Interdisciplinary and Experiential Learning ==
SUSS LifE logo

In September 2018, SUSS established the College of Lifelong and Experiential Learning (CLEL), later renamed the College of Interdisciplinary and Experiential Learning. The college comprises two units: Core Learning and Experiential Learning.

== Institute for Adult Learning ==
IAL logo

The Institute for Adult Learning (IAL) was established in December 2008 under SkillsFuture Singapore (SSG) to train Continuous Education and Training (CET) adult educators, conduct workforce development research, and drive CET innovations. On 1 April 2019, IAL was restructured as an autonomous institute within SUSS.

== Campus ==
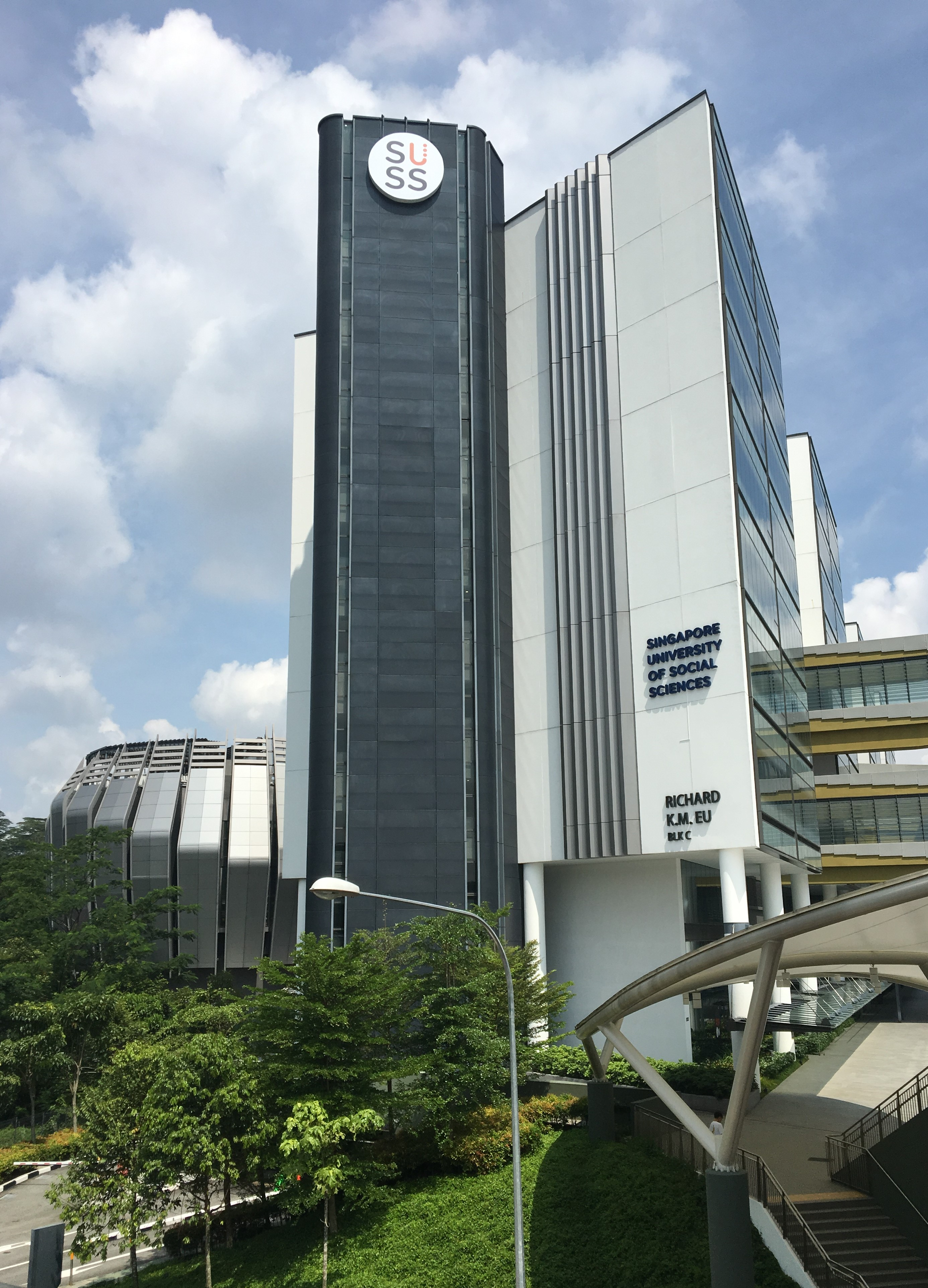
SUSS Richard K.M. Eu Block C

The campus is located on rented premises at Clementi Road. SUSS also uses external premises at Ngee Ann Polytechnic.

A 6-metre sculpture by Sun I-Yu titled "Celebrate The Extraordinary" stands outside Richard K.M. Eu Block C. The sculpture was created for the 2015 Southeast Asian Games and donated to SUSS after the event.

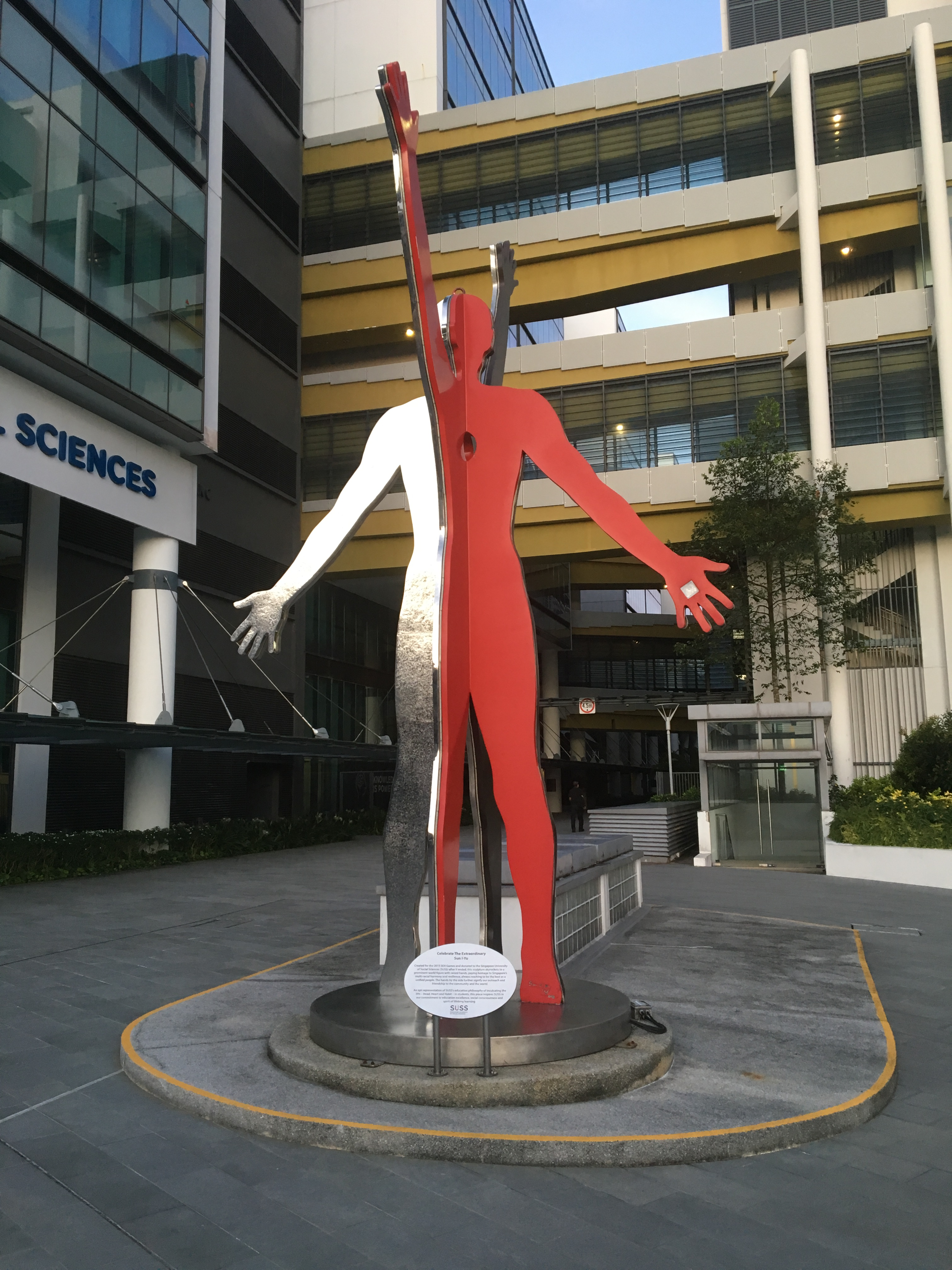
Celebrate The Extraordinary, Sun I-Yu

In 2025, the government announced that SUSS will relocate to the site of the former Rochor Centre.

== Admission ==
Minimum entry requirements include GCE 'A' levels, diplomas from the five local polytechnics or two local arts institutions, International Baccalaureate (IB) Diploma, or NUS High School Diploma. Applicants with good SAT1 scores may be considered. Some programmes have additional requirements.

Part-time programmes require applicants to have two years of full-time work experience, completed full-time National Service (for male applicants), be currently employed full-time, and be at minimum 21 years old.

In 2018, SUSS received 5,700 applications for 700 full-time places. In 2016, 388 applicants competed for 60 places in the Law programmes.

== Student support and initiatives ==
In 2018, SUSS introduced a Marriage and Baby Bonus scheme offering part-time Singaporean and Permanent Resident students free modules for marriages registered or children born or adopted on or after July 2018.

== Research and support centres ==
The Centre for Applied Research (CFAR) coordinates the university's research activities and maintains a repository of faculty and student research output.

The Centre for Chinese Studies @SUSS (CCS@SUSS) monitors trends and developments in the Chinese-speaking world.

C-three provides counselling services to SUSS students at no cost.
