= Greenridge Crescent twin killings =

2022 double murder of autistic twin brothers in Singapore

Ethan Yap
- Born: Ethan Yap E Chern; 14 October 2010; Singapore
- Died: 21 January 2022 (aged 11); Greenridge Crescent, Upper Bukit Timah, Singapore
- Cause of death: Strangulation
- Body discovered: 21 January 2022; Greenridge Crescent, Upper Bukit Timah, Singapore

Aston Yap
- Born: Aston Yap Kai Shern; 14 October 2010; Singapore
- Died: 21 January 2022 (aged 11); Greenridge Crescent, Upper Bukit Timah, Singapore
- Cause of death: Strangulation
- Body discovered: 21 January 2022; Greenridge Crescent, Upper Bukit Timah, Singapore

On 21 January 2022, at a playground in Greenridge Crescent, located in Singapore's Upper Bukit Timah, 11-year-old twin brothers Ethan Yap E Chern (Chinese: 叶育成; pinyin: Yè Yùchéng) and Aston Yap Kai Shern (Chinese: 叶凯胜; pinyin: Yè Kǎishèng), who were both diagnosed with autism, were murdered by their 48-year-old father Xavier Yap Jung Houn (Chinese: 叶俊宏; pinyin: Yè Jùnhóng). Yap strangled them both to death before attempting suicide. Yap was charged with the double murder, which shocked the nation at the time. Yap, whose murder charges were reduced due to clinical depression, was reported to have killed the boys due to his suicidal thoughts and his belief that his sons would be neglected and unloved by their mother upon his death, and wanted to kill the twins so they would not be burdens to his wife. Yap was sentenced to 14 years' imprisonment in August 2023, after he pleaded guilty to two counts of manslaughter at the High Court.

== Background ==
Twins Ethan Yap E Chern and Aston Yap Kai Shern were born on 14 October 2010 to parents Xavier Yap Jung Houn and Anna Seah Puay Hiang, the latter who had a daughter from a previous marriage who lived with the Yaps. Yap, a university graduate who formerly worked as a manager at the Ministry of Defence, had once studied for a doctorate in England.

When both Ethan and Aston were two years old, Yap and his wife suspected that the brothers were autistic after noticing certain behavioral signs. In May 2017, at the age of six, the boys were formally diagnosed with global developmental delay and autism spectrum disorder. According to sources, Seah was unable to accept the boys' condition and, despite the doctor's recommendation to enroll the boys in a special education school, enrolled the boys at age nine in Primary 1 at a mainstream primary school located in the Eng Kong estate area while they were still non-verbal. The boys encountered learning difficulties throughout their schooling, so the boys' mother and maid would each accompany one child to classes. Whenever the mother was unavailable, one of the twins would not be present for school. Reportedly, Yap's wife did not allow her husband to have a say in decisions on which school the boys should attend, or their school activities. It was reported that Yap had a good relationship with his sons. Yap would help the brothers to prepare their daily necessities and gave them whatever they wanted, and he would not resort to physical force when he disciplined the twins. Yap also played a more major role in their studies and often made time to spend with them after they enrolled in primary school.

However, in 2019 or 2020, Yap became increasingly concerned about his sons' welfare. In 2021, Yap's wife, who allegedly had an affair, began to grow more prone to anger and allegedly became more abusive towards the twins, which only added to his concerns. In December 2021, Yap began to harbour suicidal thoughts, and even bought an ice pick with plans to take his own life. At the start of 2022, the boys were about to be assessed for their suitability to remain in their mainstream primary school, and this turn of events caused Yap's wife to become more depressed and infuriated at her sons. Assuming this was a sign that his wife had given up on the boys, Yap began harbouring serious thoughts of killing his sons before he committed suicide, so as to unburden his wife. Yap also feared for his sons, concerned that they would become ostracized should he and his wife die one day, and which became another factor behind his motive of murdering his sons on 21 January 2022.

== Double murder ==
On 21 January 2022, Xavier Yap decided to carry out his murder plot at a playground near his house in Greenridge Crescent in Upper Bukit Timah, where he often brought his sons to play. The area was said to be near a forest and an open field, which was also why he chose that place. At about 4:45 PM, Yap armed himself with the ice pick and drove his sons to the playground. For the first ten minutes, both Ethan and Aston played at the playground, before Yap proceeded to bring the brothers one after another into a canal near the open field, located in the area where the playground was. Yap first laid his hands on Ethan, using a stick to press against Ethan's neck before he strangled the boy to his death, and he even placed Ethan's head underwater in the canal. Throughout the murder of Ethan, Aston was watching quietly on the side and after his brother died, Aston met the same fate, with Yap strangling Aston to death before he also submerged the boy's head into the canal water to make sure he was dead. According to an autopsy report by Dr George Paul, the boys died from strangulation.

After the boys were dead, Yap attempted to kill himself several times, using the ice pick, a tree branch and a rock. None of his attempts were successful, and as a result of these failures, Yap decided to put up an act that he was the victim of an attack, and would lie to the police about it. Yap believed that this lie would be disputed by the evidence and it would give the impression that he had no remorse, and he could be given the death penalty for murder as a wish to join his sons in the afterlife. After failing to contact his wife, Yap contacted the police and lied that he had been attacked and needed their help to find his sons, whose bodies he adjusted to face upwards while waiting for the police's arrival. Additionally, Yap went back to the canal area and shouted for help. After the arrival of police, Yap told them that he had been attacked and that someone else had killed his sons. This led the police to investigate the canal for clues. Yap described the fictitious attacker as a male in his 40s and tan-looking, which prompted the police's Gurkha contingent to conduct an extensive manhunt in the nearby area to search for possible leads to locate the "attacker". Residents of the nearby area were also interviewed by police to seek any witnesses of possible suspicious sightings.

Yap was subsequently taken to the hospital to receive treatment for his self-inflicted injuries. Deputy Superintendent of Police (DSP) Tan Boon Kok became in charge of the investigations, and after receiving Yap's word that an unknown attacker was responsible for hurting him and abducting his sons, he investigated and found that Yap's account did not add up. Through further investigations, Yap became the prime suspect and he gradually confessed that he murdered his twin sons. Yap was arrested for double murder.

The boys were cremated at Mandai Crematorium on 24 January 2022. Due to the COVID-19 pandemic in Singapore and related restrictions, only 30 family members and friends were present at the funeral wake. The boys' older sister recovered their bodies from the mortuary for funeral preparations, and she also handled the funeral arrangements with the help of the funeral director, Fong Chun Cheong, who was purportedly a friend of the Yap family.

== Indictment and remand ==
After the double murder, the police announced to the public that they had arrested Yap for the crime, and they confirmed that he would be charged with murder under Section 302(1) of the Penal Code 1871, for which the death penalty was warranted if found guilty.

On 24 January 2022, 48-year-old Xavier Yap Jung Houn was officially charged in court with the murder of one of his sons, whom the media and court reported as Ethan Yap E Chern, but at that point, Yap had yet to face any charges for the death of Ethan's twin brother. The twins' murders were the second murder case to happen during that same month; the first case was the 11 January fatal stabbing of a 30-year-old pregnant woman named Isabel Elizabeth Francis, who was killed by her husband David Brian Chow Kwok-Hun in a murder-suicide attempt; 33-year-old Chow, who did not die from his self-inflicted wounds, was charged with murder before being sentenced to seven years' in jail in October 2023 for a reduced charge of manslaughter.

On 27 January 2022, Yap was brought back to the crime scene to re-enact how he murdered Ethan and Aston. He was ordered to be remanded four days later at the medical centre of Changi Prison for psychiatric evaluation.

On 18 February 2022, Yap returned to court a second time and was charged with murdering his other son, Aston Yap Kai Shern.

In November 2022, Yap, who was still in remand awaiting trial for the double murder, discharged his previous lawyer, Anil Singh Sandhu, and engaged a new four-member defence counsel, consisting of veteran criminal lawyer Choo Si Sen and his daughter Choo Yean Lin, their law firm associate Patrick Nai, and Muhammad Razeen Sayed Majunoon from another law firm. No reasons were given for Yap's decision to change lawyers.

On 28 February 2023, the charges of murder against Yap were reduced to culpable homicide not amounting to murder, which was equivalent to manslaughter in Singaporean law. The maximum sentence for manslaughter was life imprisonment. It was revealed that based on the assessment of Dr Christopher Cheok, a psychiatrist from the Institute of Mental Health, Yap was diagnosed with major depressive disorder of moderate severity and the illness was sufficient to impair his mental responsibility at the time of the murders. The prosecution therefore decided to reduce the murder charges, which allowed Yap to escape the death penalty for murdering his sons. His case was also scheduled for further mention in March 2023.

On 18 April 2023, Yap, then 49 years old, was scheduled to stand trial at the High Court later that same year for the double manslaughter of Aston and Ethan, after Yap expressed his willingness to plead guilty. He was also scheduled to return in May 2023 for a pre-trial conference.

== Trial of Xavier Yap Jung Houn ==
Xavier Yap
- Born: Xavier Yap Jung Houn; 1973 (age 52–53); Singapore
- Occupation: Manager (former)
- Spouse: Anna Seah Puay Hiang (former)
- Children: 2 sons and 1 stepdaughter
- Status: Incarcerated at Changi Prison since 2022
- Motive: To commit suicide and to unburden his wife by killing his sons
- Conviction: Manslaughter (x2)
- Criminal charge: Murder (x2)
- Penalty: 14 years' imprisonment

On 15 August 2023, Xavier Yap Jung Houn, who turned 50 before his trial, appeared in court to submit his guilty plea for the double manslaughter of Aston Yap and Ethan Yap. Yap was convicted of the charges after he pleaded guilty before Justice Vincent Hoong of the High Court.

Yap's sentencing trial took place on the same date he pleaded guilty. The prosecution, led by Deputy Public Prosecutor (DPP) Kumaresan Gohulabalan, sought a jail term of 14 to 20 years and that both sentences should be served consecutively, stating that with two lives lost in this case, it would not be a crushing sentence. DPP Kumarsen argued that the victims in this case were vulnerable children diagnosed with autism, and Yap had taken meticulous steps to lure the boys and killed one of the brothers, Ethan, in front of the other twin, Aston, and ensured that both of them died by pinning their heads in the canal water.

As for the defence, Choo Si Sen implored the court to show leniency and focus on rehabilitation as the main principles of Yap's sentence, which should be five years' jail, and both sentences should run concurrently for the double homicide charges. Choo argued that Yap was greatly saddened by his wife's infidelity and refusal to accept their sons' autism and the fact that she chose to give up on them and abused them, and felt that he should die together with his sons to avoid them becoming burdens to his wife, fearing that the boys would be ostracized in the absence of their parents. Choo also stated that Yap, who had since filed for divorce, chose to kill the twins at the playground in Greenridge Crescent, thinking it was "a good place to end all their lives together," as he had taken the boys there to play a few times. Patrick Nai also presented Yap's personal letter to the court, in which Yap expressed remorse for his actions. The letter revealed that Yap hoped to be given a death sentence for murder to accompany his sons in the afterlife and thought it would be possible should the police find out he lied and believed he was not feeling sorry for the double murder. Yap also wrote that he changed his mind after discovering from his friends and family that his wife was allegedly not saddened and nonchalant at the death of the twins and threw out their belongings, and even invited her lover to stay in their matrimonial flat, and he thus decided to fess up with everything and expressed his wish to take care of his mother upon his release, and study for a diploma or degree in order to do social work at welfare organizations to help children with similar conditions as his sons.

On that same date, Justice Vincent Hoong delivered his verdict on Yap's sentence. In his judgement, Justice Hoong stated that Yap had committed a set of "heinous and serious," yet tragic, series of atrocities that gripped the whole of Singapore back in January 2022, and he stated that rather than caring for the boys, Yap had inflicted upon them "serious and irreparable harm" by killing them, and had betrayed the trust placed upon him as a parent when he killed his twin sons, who were vulnerable children diagnosed with autism and global developmental delay. The boys' vulnerability was especially highlighted by Aston witnessing the death of Ethan at his father's hands before he met the same fate. From this, the judge reiterated that any violence inflicted by parents on their children would be met with the full force of the law. Justice Hoong stated that while the penalty he was about to impose was in no way a compensation "for the tragic loss of two innocent young lives", the purpose of the sentence was to make Yap reflect on the irreparable harm he caused to his surviving family members by acting under the misconception that he was "easing the suffering and pain of the victims and of those around him".

Justice Hoong also stated that just because Yap was diagnosed with depression and suffered from diminished responsibility, it was not by any means an excuse for his wickedness, and rehabilitation should not become the key consideration for sentencing. Justice Hoong pointed out that Yap was able to differentiate right from wrong and his conduct was founded on fact and not delusion, based on the assertion of his wife's alleged affair and abuse of their children, and he could also understand the nature and consequences of his actions and plan the killings beforehand. Despite finding that Yap still understood that it was wrong to commit murder while having depression, Justice Hoong also took note that the depression made him believe it was acceptable to kill his sons to "relieve stress and suffering" for his family. Having noted the severity of the double killings and the nature of these crimes, Justice Hoong concluded that it was necessary to mete out an appropriate punishment to match the magnitude of Yap's actions, and it would also be morally unjust to commit Yap to serve concurrent sentences for killing his sons, since both Ethan and Aston had an equal right to life despite their deaths occurring as a single transaction. Yap had breached the sanctity of life not once, but twice. It would not be "crushing" in view of Yap's age of 50 to sentence him to serve consecutive jail terms for the double homicide.

As such, Justice Hoong sentenced 50-year-old Xavier Yap Jung Houn to seven years' imprisonment for each of the double manslaughter charges. The sentences were ordered to run consecutively and commence from the date of Yap's arrest on 22 January 2022, meaning Yap must serve a total of 14 years' imprisonment. Since the end of his sentencing, Yap is currently serving his 14-year sentence in Changi Prison.

== Societal response and aftermath ==
The double murder of Ethan Yap and Aston Yap had shocked the whole nation of Singapore when it first came to light, and residents of Greenridge Crescent, which was a relatively peaceful and crime-safe area, were saddened and shocked to hear about the twins being murdered in cold blood in their neighbourhood. Numerous members of the public went to the canal, where the bodies were found, to offer condolences and leave gifts and snacks as offerings. Member of Parliament Sim Ann for Holland-Bukit Timah GRC, as well as religious leaders like Imam Mohd Idris from Al-Huda Mosque, Venerable Rui Zhen from Beeh Low See Temple and Father Francis Lim from the Church of St Ignatius, had attended an inter-faith prayer session conducted at the canal. Additionally, the sister of the twins and some family friends appeared to mourn for the deceased at the canal. SG Enable, a governmental agency which provides services for people with disabilities, urged caregivers to seek help when they are stressed from caring for children with special needs, given that such individuals often undergo a considerable amount of stress and emotional woes for taking care of these children.

The Greenridge Crescent double killings were one of six murder cases to happen in Singapore during the year 2022. It was noted that the Greenridge Crescent case and three others were family members charged with murdering their loved ones, which showed an increasing trend of suspects killing people related to them, but a decline in killings committed through random acts of violence. Legal experts analyzed that one's potential to commit murder may arise from several compounding factors, which include mental conditions, stress and personal circumstances, and it was more plausible for a murder to happen within the family given that there was a higher rate of opportunity to strike on the account of close familial ties and shared living arrangements, not discounting any other relevant compounding factors.

After the sentencing of Xavier Yap for the double killing, the twins' 80-year-old grandmother (Yap's mother) agreed to be interviewed by the national newspaper The Straits Times about her feelings towards the case. Yap's mother, who declined to be identified publicly, told the reporters that she dearly loved and missed her grandsons, and even after they died, she often dreamt of them playing with her during the happier times of the past, and she stated that her grandsons loved to swim and play with her and enjoyed accompanying her whenever they came to her house. The elderly woman and her daughter were both present in court when her son was sentenced for killing Aston and Ethan.

== See also ==
- List of major crimes in Singapore
