= Sivakant Tiwari =

Singaporean legal officer

- Tiwari in 2009
- Born: Sivakant Tiwari s/o Thakurprasad Tiwari; 20 December 1945; India
- Died: 26 July 2010 (aged 64); Singapore
- Education: University of Singapore (LL.B., 1971)
- Occupation: Legal officer
- Employer: Singapore Legal Service
- Term: 1971–2007
- Awards: P.P.A.(E.) (1984), P.B.S. (1996), P.P.A.(E.)(L.) (2000), P.J.G. (2008)

Sivakant Tiwari, P.P.A.(E.), P.B.S., P.P.A.(E.)(L.), P.J.G. (20 December 1945 – 26 July 2010), known professionally as S. Tiwari, was a senior legal officer of the Singapore Legal Service. He was educated at the University of Singapore, graduating in law in 1971. He then made the Legal Service his career, serving as head of the Ministry of Defence's legal department (1974), and head of the Attorney-General's Chambers' Civil Division (1987) and International Affairs Division (1995). He was lead counsel in three significant commissions of inquiry arising out of fatal incidents in the 1970s and 1980s. A skilled negotiator, Tiwari was a member of the Singapore delegation which dealt with the United States – Singapore Free Trade Agreement signed in 2003, and served as legal adviser to the delegation which established diplomatic relations between Singapore and the People's Republic of China. He was also on Singapore's legal team in a case concluded in 2003 that had been brought by Malaysia to the International Tribunal for the Law of the Sea for provisional measures against alleged damage to its territorial waters due to land reclamation by Singapore, and in the territorial dispute with Malaysia over Pedra Branca before the International Court of Justice in 2007.

Tiwari retired from the Legal Service in 2007 but was re-employed by the Attorney-General's Chambers as a special consultant, and in that year was appointed by the World Trade Organization as a panellist for the first international adjudication of enforcement provisions in the Agreement on Trade-Related Aspects of Intellectual Property Rights in a dispute between China and the United States. He later became a senior visiting fellow at the Institute of Southeast Asian Studies. The founding president of the Hindi Society (Singapore) in 1990, he continued acting as principal of the Society's Hindi Centres in his retirement.

Tiwari was a recipient of the Pingat Pentadbiran Awam (Emas) (Public Administration Medal (Gold), 1984), the Pingat Bakti Setia (Long Service Award, 1996), the Public Administration Medal (Gold) (Bar) (2000), and the Pingat Jasa Gemilang (Meritorious Service Medal, 2008).

== Early years and education ==
Sivakant Tiwari was born in India on 20 December 1945. His father was a clerk and his mother a housewife. He came to Singapore at a young age, and studied at Monk's Hill Primary School and Raffles Institution. Tiwari's father Thakurprasad Tiwari had wanted him to become a doctor, but after an incident during a biology laboratory session in which he was shocked when an insufficiently chloroformed hamster he was about to dissect revived, he chose to study law at the University of Singapore instead. A student of Professor S. Jayakumar (who became Minister for Law, and later Senior Minister and Co-ordinating Minister for National Security), he graduated with a Bachelor of Laws (LL.B.) in 1971.

== Career ==
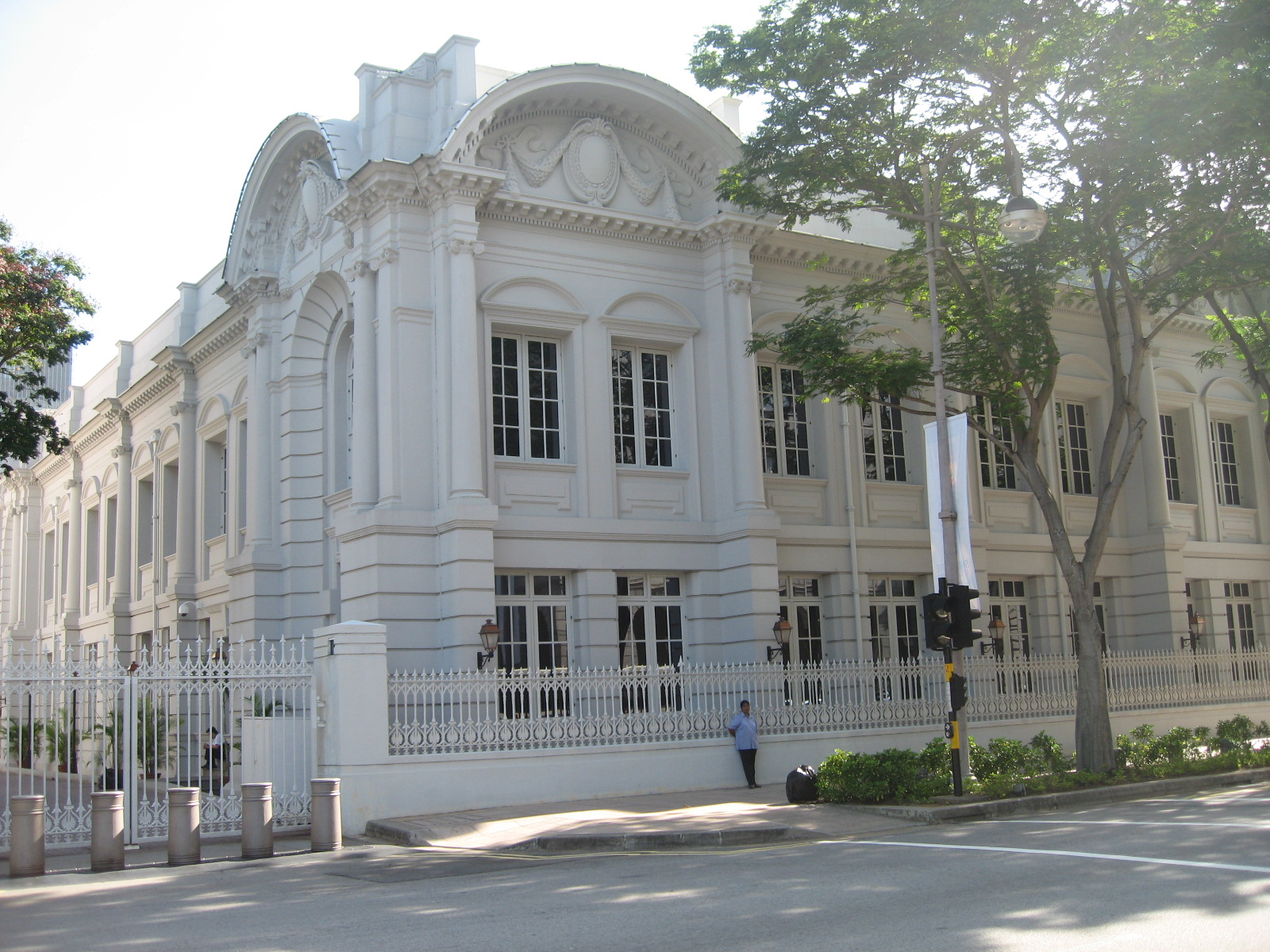
The former Attorney-General's Chambers on High Street between 1971 and 1991. The building is now Block C of Parliament House.

Upon graduation, Tiwari joined the government service as a legal officer in April 1971. He eventually spent his entire working life – 36 years – with the Singapore Legal Service. He became head of the legal department at the Ministry of Defence in 1974. After being posted to the Attorney-General's Chambers in 1978 as Deputy Senior State Counsel, he was appointed Senior State Counsel in 1984 and subsequently headed the Civil Division in October 1987 and the International Affairs Division of the Chambers from 1 July 1995 when it was formed that year.

Tiwari was lead counsel in three major public inquiries: the 1978 inquiry into the explosion and fire aboard the Greek tanker S.T. Spyros that killed 76 people; the 1984 commission of inquiry into the collision of the drillship Eniwetok into the Sentosa cableway, causing the deaths of seven people when two cable-cars fell into the ocean; and the inquiry into the collapse of Hotel New World in 1988. As Deputy Senior State Counsel, he also represented the state in a number of important cases. In 1985, he successfully argued before Justice T. S. Sinnathuray in the High Court that since the Military Court of Appeal was a superior court of record, its jurisdiction and the exercise of its powers to hear appeals from subordinate military courts could not be challenged in the High Court by way of judicial review. He also acted for the Government in the 1988 habeas corpus applications of persons detained under the Internal Security Act during Operation Spectrum before the High Court in De Souza Kevin Desmond v. Minister for Home Affairs and Teo Soh Lung v. Minister for Home Affairs, and in the appeal from those judgments to the Court of Appeal in Chng Suan Tze v. Minister for Home Affairs. In the latter case, the Court of Appeal held in a landmark decision that the executive's decision to detain a person under the Act on national security grounds was reviewable by the courts. The effect of this decision was legislatively reversed in 1989, and Tiwari also represented the Government in challenges to the legality of the amending legislation in the case of Teo Soh Lung v. Minister for Home Affairs.

Tiwari acted as legal advisor to the Singapore team to the Uruguay Round of Multilateral Trade Negotiations, serving in particular as Singapore's lead negotiator for intellectual property issues during the Uruguay Round. In addition, he was chairman of the Association of Southeast Asian Nations (ASEAN) Working Group on Intellectual Property for six years, and of the Asia-Pacific Economic Cooperation forum's Intellectual Property Experts' Group from 2005 to 2007. He was a member of the Singapore delegation which negotiated the United States – Singapore Free Trade Agreement (FTA) signed on 6 May 2003, and led negotiations for the FTA's Intellectual Property and Dispute Settlement Chapters. He also led talks relating to numerous investment agreements on Singapore's behalf, including those with Iran, Oman, Russia and Saudi Arabia; and assisted with the drafting of various ASEAN legal instruments, including the Framework Agreement on Enhancing ASEAN Economic Cooperation, the Agreement on the Common Effective Preferential Tariff Scheme for the ASEAN Free Trade Area, the ASEAN Protocol on Enhanced Dispute Settlement Mechanism, and the ASEAN Framework Agreement for the Integration of the Priority Sectors.

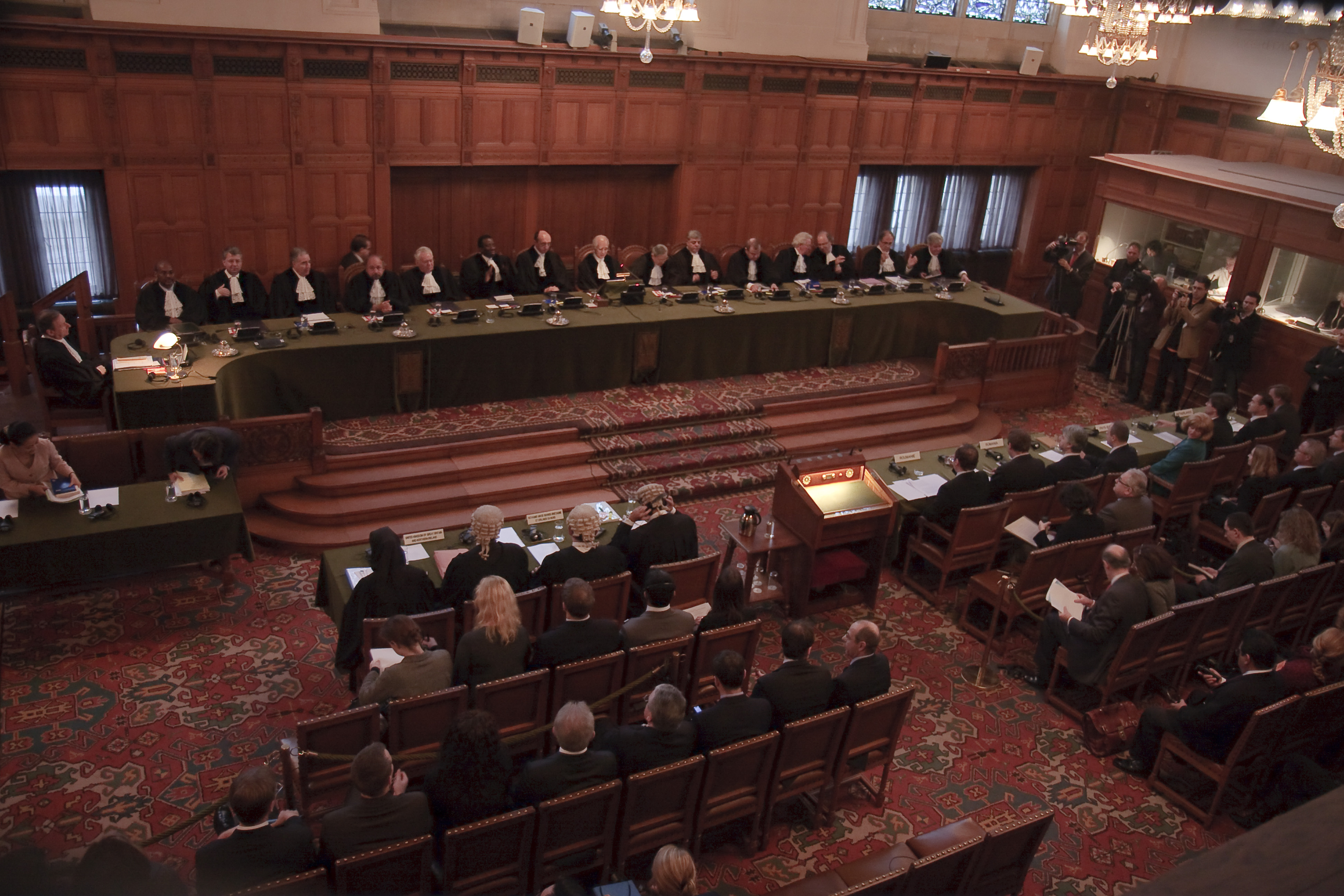
The International Court of Justice in session in the Grand Hall of Justice of the Peace Palace in The Hague on 10 December 2009

Tiwari was one of the first legal officers who specialized in public international law when the International Affairs Division of the Attorney-General's Chambers was established. He was part of the Singapore team to the United Nations Conference on the Law of the Sea and helped to frame important provisions in the United Nations Convention on the Law of the Sea (UNCLOS), which Singapore acceded to on 17 November 1994. He also headed negotiations which culminated in the signing of a pact in 1994 delineating a new boundary between Malaysia and Singapore in the Straits of Johor. Tiwari was on Singapore's legal team in a case brought by Malaysia to the International Tribunal for the Law of the Sea for provisional measures against alleged damage to its territorial waters due to land reclamation by Singapore in Tuas. On 8 October 2003, the Tribunal declined to prescribe provisional measures, stating that Malaysia had not shown that there was a situation of urgency or any risk that its rights to its territorial sea would suffer irreversible damage pending consideration of the merits of the case. Having been involved in the territorial dispute between Singapore and Malaysia over Pedra Branca, Middle Rocks and South Ledge for almost 30 years, including leading bilateral negotiations to attempt a settlement and later to conclude the special agreement submitting the dispute to the International Court of Justice (ICJ), he was part of the team that presented Singapore's case before the ICJ in 2007. The following year, the Court ruled that Singapore had sovereignty over Pedra Branca. Tiwari was also legal adviser to the delegation which negotiated the agreement establishing diplomatic relations between Singapore and the People's Republic of China, and was a member of the Hindu Endowments Board (from 2 May 1983), the Hindu Advisory Board which advises the Government and the Hindu Endowments Board on matters relating to the Hindu religion and custom, and the board of the Maritime and Port Authority of Singapore.

== Later life ==
Despite retiring from the Legal Service in December 2007, Tiwari was re-employed by the Attorney-General's Chambers as a special consultant until December 2008. On 13 December 2007, he was appointed by the World Trade Organization as a panellist for the first international adjudication of enforcement provisions in the Agreement on Trade-Related Aspects of Intellectual Property Rights in a dispute between China and the United States. Following his stint as a consultant, he became a senior visiting fellow at the Institute of Southeast Asian Studies. He was appointed to the board of governors of the IP Academy, an organization providing training and conducting research in intellectual property matters, on 1 February 2009. He was also Secretary of the Kreta Ayer People's Foundation and patron of the Siglap South Management Committee.

Tiwari was the founding president of the Hindi Society (Singapore) and continued to serve as principal of the Hindi Centres managed by the Society in his retirement years. In 1989 he had been elected to chair a pro tempore committee to look into the study of Hindi, and met the Minister for Education Dr. Tony Tan Keng Yam to request that Hindi be allowed to be learned as a second language by students. On 6 October 1989, the Minister announced that Hindi – along with Bengali, Gujarati, Punjabi and Urdu – would be offered as a second language in secondary schools up to the O-level standard. While the Ministry would provide premises for the lessons, students had to make their own arrangements for teachers. The pro tem committee arranged for the first Hindi classes for secondary school students on 21 January 1990 and, after registering as the Hindi Society (Singapore) on 4 August 1990, began primary school classes the next day. Tiwari was also vice-president of the Board for the Teaching and Testing of South Asian Languages.

On 25 July 2010, Tiwari had a severe headache and was taken to hospital and operated upon. However, while sedated, he suffered a fatal aneurysm and cerebral haemorrhage, and died shortly before noon on 26 July 2010 aged 64 years. He was cremated that evening. He was survived by his wife Mrs. Teekeshwari Tiwari; his three children, daughter Lachimi and sons Rama and Anand; and his sister Sushila.

Prime Minister Lee Hsien Loong wrote in his letter of condolence to Mrs. Tiwari that her husband "did much to advance Singapore's interests internationally. He was a determined, patient and skilful negotiator. He held his own against diplomats and lawyers from other countries and could be counted upon to deliver results for Singapore." In a tribute published in The Straits Times on 27 July 2010, Senior Minister and Co-ordinating Minister for National Security S. Jayakumar said that Tiwari "was much respected, not just by his colleagues in the Singapore public service, but in Asean and internationally. Whether negotiating bilateral agreements or at international conferences, he achieved the reputation among other delegations as a tough, fair-minded and skilful negotiator." Minister Mentor Lee Kuan Yew said in a condolence letter of 29 July that "Singapore has lost an outstanding legal public officer".

== Awards and honours ==
Tiwari was awarded the Pingat Pentadbiran Awam (Emas) (Public Administration Medal (Gold)) in 1984 for directing investigations into the Sentosa cable car tragedy, and for his involvement in drafting much of the defence-related legislation during the early years of the Ministry of Defence. In 1996 he received the Pingat Bakti Setia (Long Service Award), and in 2000 an additional Lintang or Bar for his Public Administration Medal (Gold). For his contributions to the Pedra Branca case, he was conferred the Pingat Jasa Gemilang (Meritorious Service Medal) in 2008.

== Selected works ==
=== Articles and book chapters ===
- Sivakant Tiwari (1994), "Legal Implications of the Asean Free Trade Area", Singapore Journal of Legal Studies: 218–233, SSRN 956018.
- Sivakant Tiwari; Warren Chik (2001), "Legal Implications of Airline Co-operation: Some Legal Issues and Consequences Arising from the Rise of Airline Strategic Alliances and Integration in the International Dimension", Singapore Academy of Law Journal, 13: 296–322, SSRN 647782.
- Sivakant Tiwari (2004), "The Role of Legal Counsel and Dispute Settlement", in Koh, Tommy T B; Chang, Li Lin (eds.), The United States Singapore Free Trade Agreement: Highlights and Insights, Singapore: World Scientific Publishing; Institute of Policy Studies, ISBN 978-981-238-848-3.

=== Books ===
- S. Tiwari, ed. (2010), ASEAN: Life after the Charter, Singapore: Institute of Southeast Asian Studies, ISBN 978-9-814-27956-7.
