= Chng Suan Tze v Minister for Home Affairs =

1988 Singapore Court of Appeal judgement

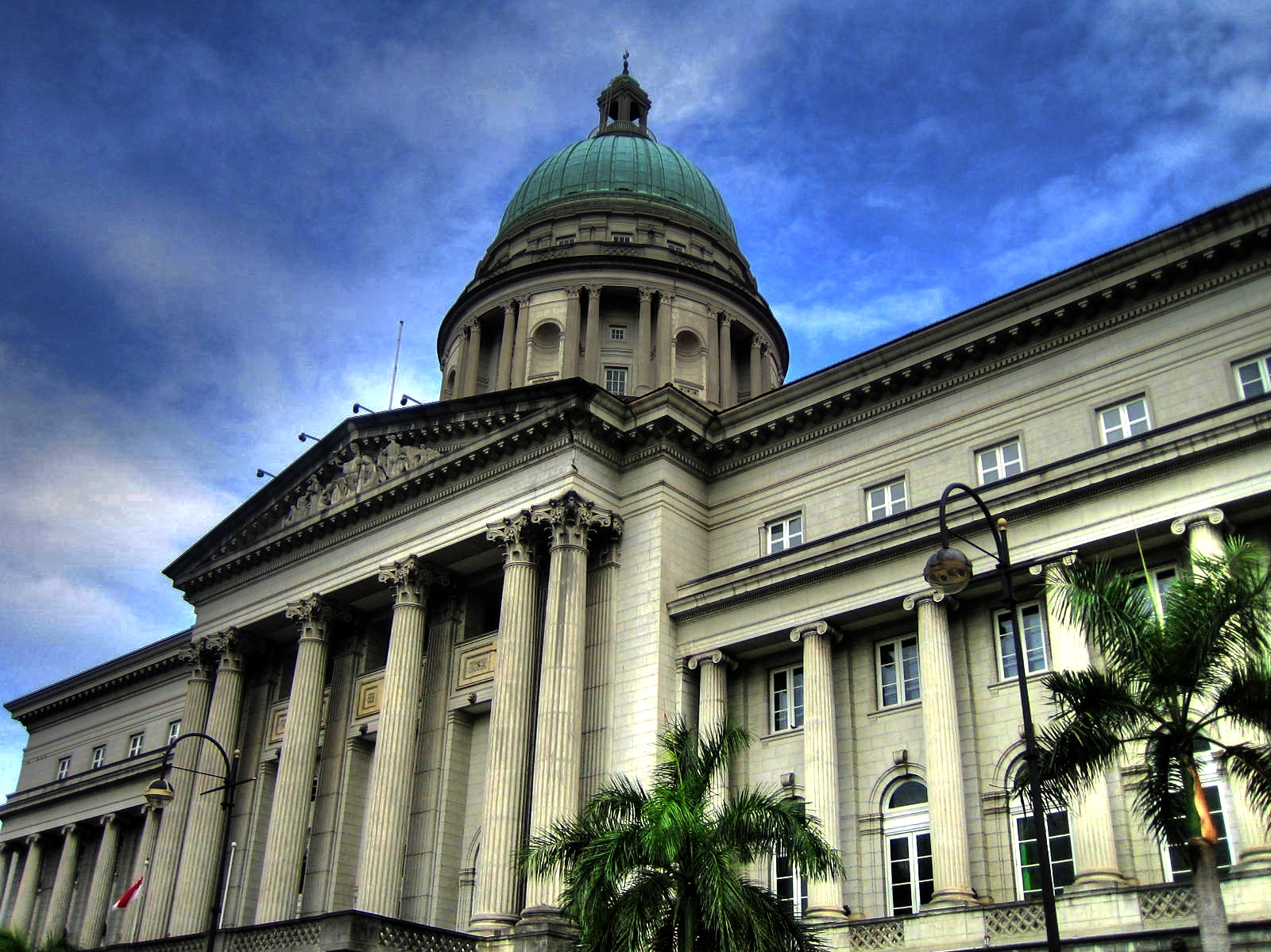
- The Old Supreme Court Building, Singapore, photographed in April 2007
- Court: Court of Appeal of Singapore
- Full case name: Chng Suan Tze v. Minister for Home Affairs and others and other appeals
- Decided: 8 December 1988
- Citations: [1988] SGCA 16, [1988] 2 S.L.R.(R.) 525

Case history
- Prior actions: De Souza Kevin Desmond v. Minister for Home Affairs [1988] 1 S.L.R.(R.) 464, H.C.; Teo Soh Lung v. Minister for Home Affairs [1988] 2 S.L.R.(R.) 30, H.C.
- Related actions: Teo Soh Lung v. Minister for Home Affairs [1989] 1 S.L.R.(R.) 461, H.C.; [1990] 1 S.L.R.(R.) 347, C.A.; Cheng Vincent v. Minister for Home Affairs [1990] 1 S.L.R.(R.) 38, H.C.

Court membership
- Judges sitting: Wee Chong Jin C.J., L.P. Thean and Chan Sek Keong JJ.

Case opinions
- Exercise of discretion by President and Minister for Home Affairs under ss. 8 and 10 of the Internal Security Act subject to judicial review by a court as an objective rather than subjective test applies.

Chng Suan Tze v. Minister for Home Affairs is a seminal case in administrative law decided by the Court of Appeal of Singapore in 1988. The Court decided the appeal in the appellants' favour on a technical ground, but considered obiter dicta the reviewability of government power in preventive detention cases under the Internal Security Act ("ISA"). The case approved the application by the court of an objective test in the review of government discretion under the ISA, stating that all power has legal limits and the rule of law demands that the courts should be able to examine the exercise of discretionary power. This was a landmark shift from the position in the 1971 High Court decision Lee Mau Seng v. Minister of Home Affairs, which had been an authority for the application of a subjective test until it was overruled by Chng Suan Tze.

Chng Suan Tze was followed by amendments by Parliament to the Constitution and the ISA in 1989 which purported to return the applicable law regarding judicial review of government discretion under the ISA to that in Lee Mau Seng. The legality of these changes was challenged in Teo Soh Lung v. Minister for Home Affairs (1990). In that decision, the Court of Appeal affirmed that the legislative amendments to the Act were plain and unambiguous, and thus validly established that the subjective test of judicial review now applied to internal security matters.

== Facts and legal issues ==
Between May and June 1987, the appellants Chng Suan Tze, Kevin Desmond de Souza, Teo Soh Lung and Wong Souk Yee were arrested by the Internal Security Department (ISD) during Operation Spectrum for alleged involvement in a Marxist conspiracy to subvert and destabilise the country. Detention orders were made against the appellants under section 8(1)(a) of the Internal Security Act by the Minister for Home Affairs and Law, S. Jayakumar, directing that they be detained for one year. The provision empowers the Minister to make an order directing that a person be detained if the President is satisfied that detention is necessary to prevent the person from endangering, among other things, the security or public order of Singapore.

Subsequently, the detention orders were suspended under section 10 of the ISA. However, following the release of a press statement by the appellants in which they denied the Government's accusation that they were Marxist conspirators, the suspension directions were revoked and they were re-arrested. The revocation order stated that "in view of the statement, it is necessary in the public interest that the direction ... be revoked." The Ministry of Home Affairs later stated that investigations had established that the press statement was a political ploy to discredit the Government and that the appellants had sworn statutory declarations reaffirming the truth of their original statements to the ISD. The appellants' one-year detentions were subsequently extended under section 8(2) of the ISA.

In May and June 1988, the appellants unsuccessfully applied to the High Court for leave to apply for writs of habeas corpus. The appellants then appealed to the Court of Appeal. The lead counsels were Geoffrey Robertson Q.C. for Chng, de Souza and Wong; Anthony Lester Q.C. for Teo; and Sivakant Tiwari for the respondents.

The following issues were raised in the appeals:

- Whether the Minister for Home Affairs' discretionary power under sections 8 and 10 of the ISA to issue a detention order, suspend the order and revoke the suspension is reviewable by a court of law.
- Whether the re-detention of the appellants was lawful under section 10 of the ISA.
- Whether Teo's detention, even if originally lawful, had been rendered unlawful by the conditions of her detention.

== Ratio decidendi ==
The ratio decidendi, or legal point in the case which determined the judgment, was a narrow one. The appeals were allowed on the ground that the Minister had not discharged the burden of proving the validity of the detention orders. Under section 8(1) of the ISA, the President's satisfaction that a person poses a national security risk is a condition precedent to the Minister's power to make a detention order. The Minister attempted to demonstrate that the President had been so satisfied before the detention order was made by pointing to the fact that the recitals in the detention orders stated that the President "is satisfied", and by filing an affidavit by the Permanent Secretary to the Minister for Home Affairs which asserted that the "government" was satisfied that the appellants were a danger to national security. However, the Court of Appeal found that this was inadmissible evidence as it amounted to hearsay. Furthermore, as regards the affidavit, the satisfaction of the Government was not the same as the President's satisfaction.

== Obiter dicta ==
The Chng Suan Tze decision is more notable for the issues that the Court of Appeal discussed obiter dicta, having already allowed the appeals on the ground that the respondents had not discharged their burden of proving the President's satisfaction.

=== Reviewability of the exercise of discretion ===
The Court held that the exercises of discretion by the President and the Minister under sections 8 and 10 of the ISA are reviewable by the courts because the subjective test that had been adopted in the 1969 Malaysian case Karam Singh v. Menteri Hal Ehwal Dalam Negeri (Minister of Home Affairs), Malaysia, which had been adopted locally in 1971 in Lee Mau Seng v. Minister for Home Affairs, could no longer be supported and should be replaced by an objective test. Furthermore, although a court would not question the executive's decision as to what national security required, the court could examine whether the executive's decision was indeed based on national security considerations.

==== Application of the objective test ====
Under the subjective test applied in Karam Singh and Lee Mau Seng, the exercise of discretion by the President and the Minister under sections 8 and 10 of the ISA is not open to review. The court cannot enquire about the grounds and the facts justifying the executive's decision. In contrast, under the objective test, the exercise of discretion is reviewable by a court of law and the executive has to satisfy the court that there are objective facts justifying the executive's decision.

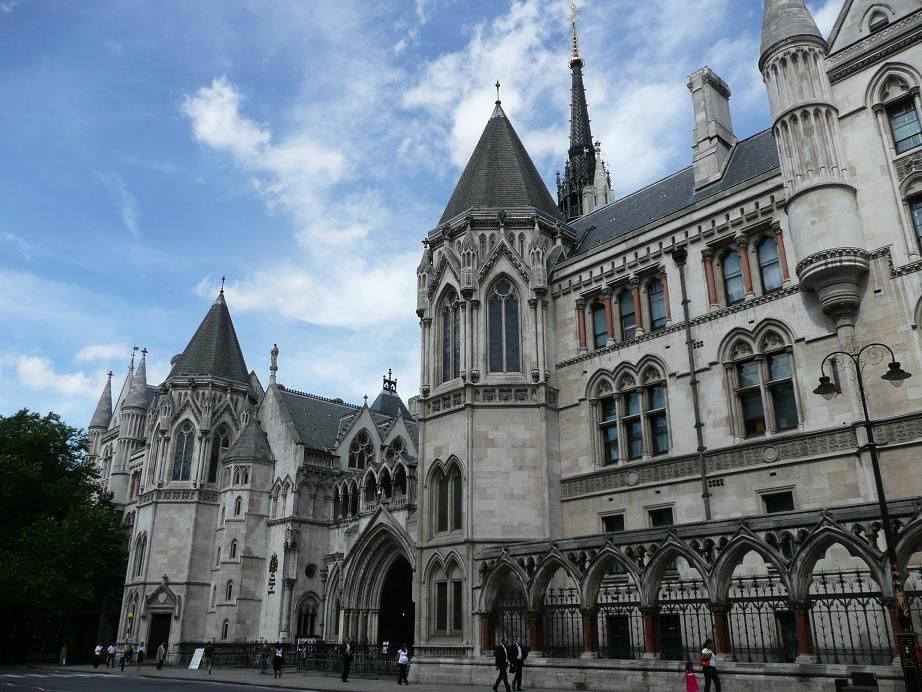
The Royal Courts of Justice in London, where the House of Lords used to sit until its judicial functions were taken over by the Supreme Court of the United Kingdom in 2009. In Chng Suan Tze, the Court of Appeal declined to apply the House of Lords cases Liversidge v. Anderson and Greene v. Secretary of State for Home Affairs.

The Court of Appeal rejected the application of the subjective test in favour of the objective test on the following grounds. Firstly, the Court held that Karam Singh and other cases following it were no longer good law in so far as they applied Liversidge v. Anderson (1941) and Greene v. Secretary of State for Home Affairs (1941), which were World War II cases from the United Kingdom. The House of Lords and the Privy Council had since recognised that the majority judgments in Liversidge and Greene had been wrong, and preferred Lord Atkin's dissenting judgment in Liversidge which advocated the objective approach.

Secondly, the Court concurred with judicial opinion expressed in other Commonwealth jurisdictions that courts can objectively review the executive's exercise of discretion in the context of preventive detention on national security grounds. Cases from Zimbabwe, South-West Africa, and St. Christopher, Nevis and Anguilla were referred to with approval.

Thirdly, applying the subjective test in reviewing the exercise of discretion under the ISA would mean giving the executive arbitrary powers of detention, rendering such powers unconstitutional and void. The ISA was enacted pursuant to Article 149(1) of the Constitution which, at the time Chng Suan Tze was decided, stated that any provision of a law designed to stop or prevent a number of specified actions threatening national security was valid notwithstanding that it was inconsistent with three of the fundamental liberties protected by the Constitution, or would, apart from Article 149(1) itself, be outside the legislative power of Parliament. However, the Article did not protect the validity of sections 8 and 10 of the ISA against any inconsistency with Article 12(1) of the Constitution, which guarantees equality before the law and equal protection of the law. In Ong Ah Chuan v. Public Prosecutor (1980), the Privy Council held that the word law in Article 12, among other provisions, refers to a system of law which incorporates fundamental rules of natural justice that had formed part and parcel of the common law of England that was in operation in Singapore at the commencement of the Constitution. The Court of Appeal expressed the view that although sections 8 and 10 of the ISA were not arbitrary because they permitted detentions only for specific purposes which bore a reasonable relation to the object of the law, if a court could not review the exercise of the discretion, "that discretion would be in actual fact as arbitrary as if the provisions themselves do not restrict the discretion to any purpose and to suggest otherwise would in our view be naive". Therefore, if a subjective test was applied, that would allow for arbitrary detention which would result in inconsistency with Article 12(1).

Fourthly, support for the applicability of the objective test was found in Teh Cheng Poh v. Public Prosecutor (1978), a Privy Council decision on appeal from Malaysia, in which it was held that "as with all discretions conferred upon the executive by Act of Parliament, [the Malaysian ISA] does not exclude the jurisdiction of the courts to inquire whether the purported exercise of the discretion was nevertheless ultra vires either because it was done in bad faith ... or because as a result of misconstruing the provision of the Act".

Finally, the Court was also of the opinion that "the notion of a subjective or unfettered discretion is contrary to the rule of law" because "all power has legal limits", and therefore the exercise of discretionary power warrants court examination. Furthermore, the ISA did not contain any ouster clause applicable to section 8 or 10. The Court also refuted the argument that accountability to Parliament was an alternative safeguard against the executive abusing its powers under the ISA, citing Inland Revenue Commissioners v. National Federation of Self-Employed and Small Businesses Ltd. (1981):

It is not, in my view, a sufficient answer to say that judicial review of the actions of officers or departments of central government is unnecessary because they are accountable to Parliament for the way in which they carry out their functions. They are accountable to Parliament for what they do so far as regards efficiency and policy, and of that Parliament is the only judge; they are responsible to a court of justice for the lawfulness of what they do, and of that the court is the only judge ...

==== National security considerations ====
The Court of Appeal held further that as the discretion conferred by section 8 of the ISA involved national security, the issue of whether detention was necessary should be left solely to executive discretion. However, the Court referred to two United Kingdom decisions which stood for the principle that courts are not precluded from determining whether a decision is in fact based on grounds of national security. Therefore, the court could still determine whether the matters relied on by the executive in the exercise of discretion were indeed within the scope of section 8.

=== Scope of judicial review ===
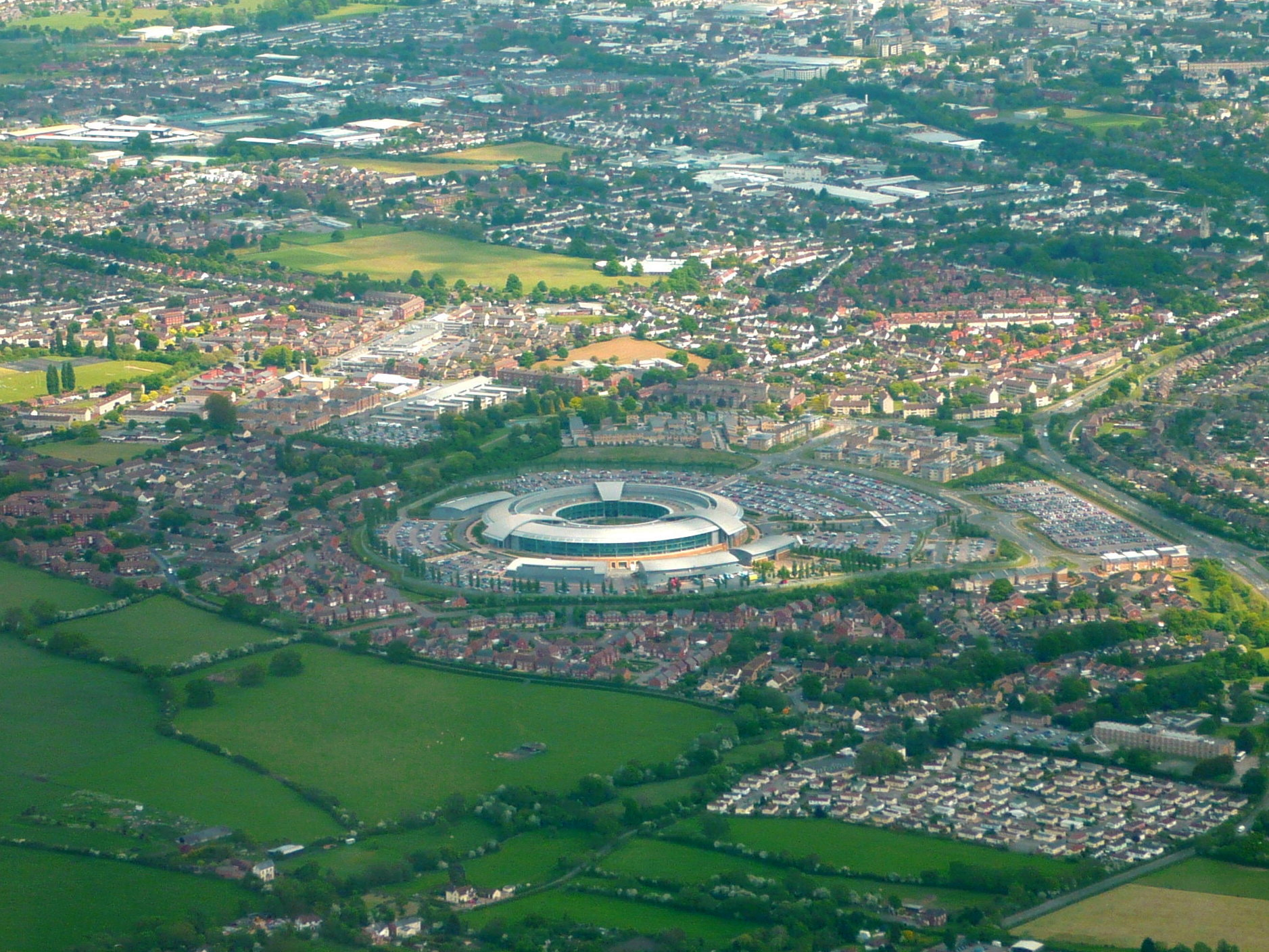
Government Communications Headquarters (GCHQ) in Cheltenham, UK, popularly known as "The Doughnut". A 1984 case decided by the House of Lords involving GCHQ employees established the principle that exercises of executive power can be reviewed by the courts on the grounds of illegality, irrationality and procedural impropriety.

The Court of Appeal held that the scope of review of the discretion conferred by sections 8 and 10 of the ISA is limited to the traditional administrative law grounds of illegality, irrationality and procedural impropriety as established in the House of Lords decision Council of Civil Service Unions v. Minister for the Civil Service (1984), also known as the GCHQ case. The Court noted that the scope of judicial review depends on whether a jurisdictional or precedent fact is involved. Where no jurisdictional fact is involved, the scope of review is limited to the GCHQ grounds. Where a jurisdictional fact issue arises, the scope of review extends to deciding whether the precedent fact has been established. Whether a particular discretionary power is subject to any jurisdictional fact depends on the construction of the legislation which creates that power.

The appellants argued that the discretion conferred on the President and the Minister for Home Affairs by sections 8 and 10 of the ISA could only be exercised if the fact – which was jurisdictional in nature – that the appellants were likely to act or to continue acting in a manner prejudicial to Singapore's security could be objectively established. However, the Court concluded that the discretion conferred by the ISA on the President and the Minister for Home Affairs by those provisions, properly construed, did not involve a jurisdictional fact. Section 8(1) had expressly entrusted to the President the decision as to whether or not a detainee was likely to act or to continue acting in a manner prejudicial to national security, and section 10 had entrusted to the Minister the decision whether on available evidence a revocation order was necessary in the public interest. In any case, it could not have been Parliament's intent to leave the issue of whether a detainee was likely to act or continue acting in a manner prejudicial to Singapore's security to be objectively determined as a fact by a court of law. The Court said: "It hardly needs any emphasis that the judicial process is unsuitable for reaching decisions on national security."

The Court also rejected the proposition that the principle of proportionality be recognised as a separate ground for judicial review. Rather, it should be subsumed under irrationality, in the sense that if an executive decision is disproportionate it can be said to be irrational in that no reasonable authority could have come to such a decision.

=== Burden of proof ===
According to the Court of Appeal, the burden of proof of justifying the lawfulness of the appellants' detention was, in the first instance, on the detaining authority. This burden of proof could be discharged by evidence that the President, acting in accordance with advice of the Cabinet or an authorised minister, was satisfied that the detention was necessary for national security purposes, and by the production of the detention order. Once the detaining authority had discharged the initial burden of proof, a burden of proof fell on the appellants to challenge their detention on GCHQ grounds.

=== Other issues ===
==== Power of re-detention ====
Counsel for Chng, de Souza and Wong argued that although section 10 of the ISA conferred power on the Minister of Home Affairs to revoke a direction suspending a detention order, it did not empower him to subsequently re-arrest and re-detain his clients. Since section 10 should be strictly construed in favour of the detainees' liberty, the court could not imply a power of arrest and detention into section 10 when Parliament had not provided for it. The Court of Appeal took the view that once a suspension direction under section 10 is revoked, the original detention order becomes operative again. The power to arrest and detain is conferred by the detention order itself.

==== Conditions of detention ====
Teo's counsel submitted that the nature and conditions of her detention rendered the detention unlawful. The Court of Appeal accepted that detention that was prima facie lawful can become unlawful if the nature or conditions of the detention fall below some minimum standard of treatment, but that extremely inhuman conditions must be shown to exist. In general, where the manner in which the detention is conducted is alleged to be unlawful, the detainee's remedy is to challenge the validity of the conditions of the detention, not the lawfulness of the detention itself.

== Aftermath ==
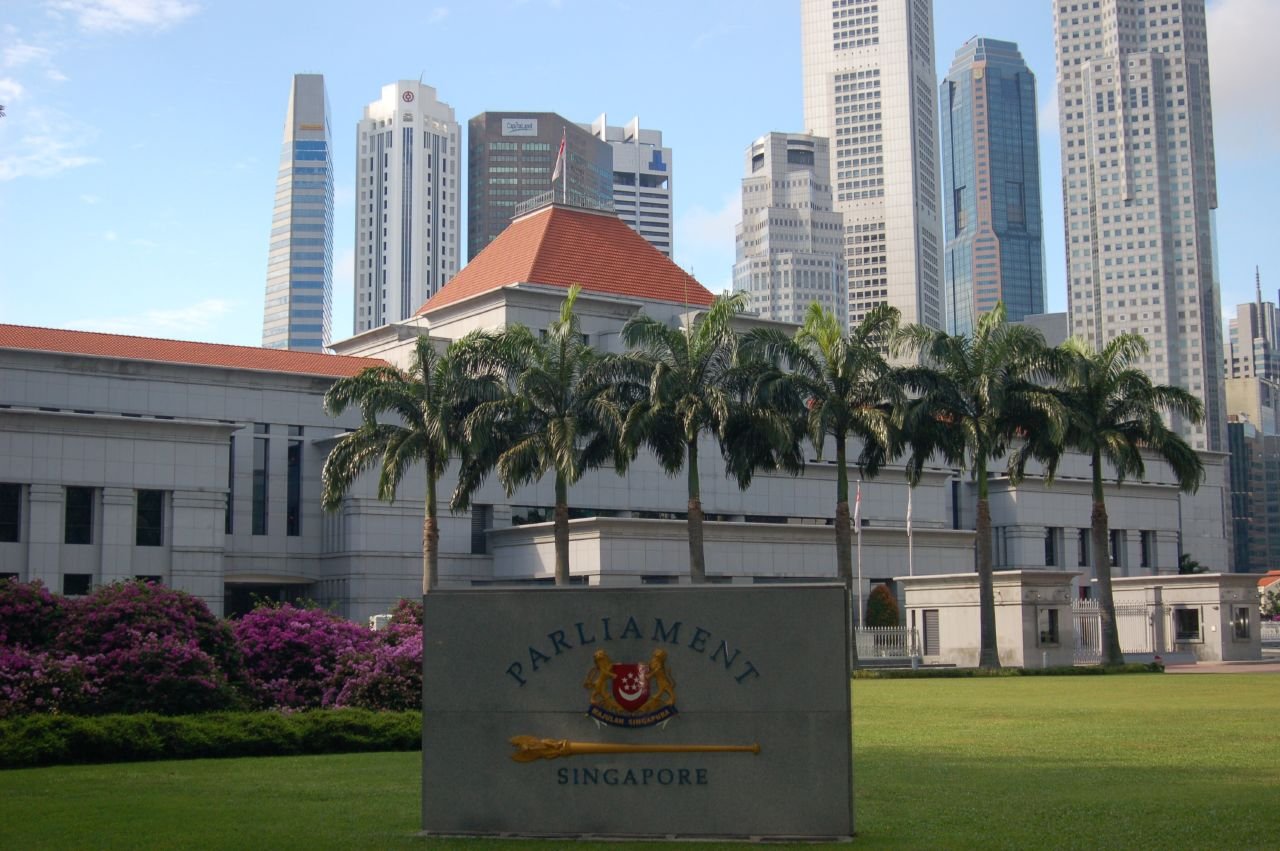
Parliament House in June 2006. Amendments to the Constitution and the ISA were passed by Parliament in 1989 to reverse the effect of the Court of Appeal's judgment in Chng Suan Tze.

Following the Court of Appeal's decision in December 1988, the Singapore Government introduced bills into Parliament to amend the Constitution and the ISA to reverse the effect of the Chng Suan Tze judgment. The bills were enacted on 25 January 1989, with the constitutional amendments taking effect on 27 January, and the ISA amendments taking effect from 30 January 1989.

The constitution amendment bill inserted a new Article 149(3) into the Constitution which provided that any question as to the validity of any exercise of executive discretion with respect to any law referred in Article 149 (which included ISA) was to be "determined in accordance with the provisions of any law as may be enacted by Parliament for this purpose", a reference to the 1989 amendments to the ISA. In addition, nothing in Article 93 – which provides that "judicial power of Singapore" is "vested in a Supreme Court and in such subordinate courts as may be provided by any written law for the time being in force" – invalidated such provisions. Article 149(1) itself was also amended to state that inconsistency with various fundamental liberties guaranteed by the Constitution did not affect the validity of a law designed to stop or prevent action threatening national security, or "any amendment to that law or any provision in any law enacted under the provision of clause (3) [that is, Article 149(3)]". The list of fundamental liberties referred to in Article 149(1) was extended to include Article 11, which prohibits retrospective criminal laws and repeated criminal trials, and Article 12, which protects equality before the law and equal protection of the law.

Judicial review of preventive detention pursuant to the ISA was curtailed by the insertion of sections 8A to 8D. Section 8A defined judicial review in the Act to mean applications for the prerogative orders of mandamus, prohibition and certiorari; applications for a declaration or an injunction; writs of habeas corpus; and "any other suit or action relating to or arising out of any decision made or act done in pursuance of any power conferred upon the President or the Minister by any provision of this Act". The section was presumably intended to cover all possible court applications that might be brought against executive directions and orders made under the ISA.

Section 8B(1) returned the law governing judicial review to that "applicable and declared in Singapore on the 13th day of July 1971", the day Lee Mau Seng was decided. In addition, the provision stated that no decision on or after the date from any other Commonwealth country would apply in Singapore. This was intended to overturn the dicta in Chng Suan Tze that an objective test was to be preferred, and to restrict the courts to applying the subjective test. Section 8B(2) further entrenched this by limiting judicial review only to questions of "compliance with any procedural requirement of [the ISA]".

Further, section 8C abolished all appeals to the Privy Council relating to "any decision made or act done under" the ISA in respect of "any question of interpretation of the provisions of Part XII of the Constitution or any law made thereunder", which included Article 149. This prevented any appeals to the Privy Council that questioned the constitutionality of the amendments to the Constitution and the ISA. Section 8C was repealed after all appeals to the Privy Council from Singapore were abolished in 1994. Finally, section 8D provided for the retrospective application of the amendments to the ISA to any proceedings for judicial review of any decision made or act done under the Act made before the 1989 amendments.

The legality of the amendments to the Constitution and ISA was unsuccessfully challenged by Teo in Teo Soh Lung v. Minister for Home Affairs (1989–1990) and by another detainee, Vincent Cheng, in Cheng Vincent v. Minister for Home Affairs (1990).

The principle that the correct test in judicial review proceedings is an objective one continues to apply in cases not involving the Internal Security Act. In Kamal Jit Singh v. Minister for Home Affairs (1992), the Court of Appeal remarked that, following Chng Suan Tze, the power of the Minister for Home Affairs under section 30(a) of the Criminal Law (Temporary Provisions) Act to order the preventive detention of a person was dependent on the Minister's objective, and not subjective, satisfaction that the person was associated with criminal activities.

== Academic opinions ==
The Court of Appeal's decision and the amendments to the Constitution and the ISA which followed have sparked much academic discourse. The following issues have been raised by commentators.

=== Use of foreign case law in deciding ISA cases ===
The reliance on Privy Council and Commonwealth case law by the Court has been noted by commentators as "an important precedent for a universalist approach to constitutional interpretation". However, Parliament disapproved of the Court's use of foreign case law as a guide in ISA cases because the "conditions [in those jurisdictions] are totally different from ours". This was relied on as a justification for the amendments which returned the law to that enunciated in Lee Mau Seng.

Professor Thio Li-ann notes that this represented "an attempt to 'freeze' the common law, whose very nature is to evolve incrementally". Furthermore, adopting the position of the majority in Liversidge v. Anderson, meant applying a test that had been formulated in World War II Britain in modern peace-time Singapore.

During the Second Reading of the Constitution of the Republic of Singapore (Amendment) Bill, the Minister for Home Affairs and Law S. Jayakumar said that the Singapore courts had no choice but to apply United Kingdom and other Commonwealth precedents because if they ignored them, the Privy Council would probably overrule the Court of Appeal. However, it has been noted that contrary to this suggestion, the Court of Appeal in Chng Suan Tze came to its decision after "a well-reasoned, careful examination of Commonwealth precedents".

=== Judiciary's role in national security ===
One of the Parliament's justifications for restricting judicial review in response to Chng Suan Tze was that national security is "not a judicial decision" and is not capable of "objective evaluation by the courts". Commentators have noted, though, that the role of the court as enunciated in Chng Suan Tze is merely to be convinced that there is a national security issue at hand, not to inquire into the executive action required to preserve it. In fact, the court applied the doctrine of justiciability which recognises that the limits of judicial review in politically sensitive issues is better left to the discretion of the executive.

It has also been argued that by introducing an ouster clause into the ISA, an externally imposed restraint on the judiciary, Parliament has exhibited distrust towards the judiciary's ability to exercise self-restraint in dealing with ISA cases.

=== Rule of law ===
The Court of Appeal in Chng Suan Tze has been lauded for its "desire to cultivate a robust conception of the rule of law that promoted government accountability". The judgment has also been praised for its "high valuation of human rights as against the government".

In purporting to reverse the Court's decision, the 1989 amendments have been criticised for being contrary to the rule of law. Thus, it has been commented that by amending Article 149 to include a notwithstanding clause, the Government had in fact exempted anti-subversion laws enacted under Part XII of the Constitution from the operation of various constitutional provisions. Furthermore, by deeming that such laws were not outside legislative power, Parliament and not the Constitution is supreme where the making of such "special powers" laws is concerned. Also, this gives the executive "a draconian power without any substantial checks".

In response to the potential for abuse of the wide powers conferred upon the executive, the Minister for Home Affairs and Law argued that the judiciary could not be an effective check as a bad government could abuse all discretionary powers and "pack the courts", rendering a judicial remedy "highly illusory". In his opinion, the best safeguard against abuse was for citizens "to ensure that the Government elected is composed of men of integrity, honesty and incorruptibility". However, this differed from the position he had taken 22 years earlier when he had recognised the possibility of an authoritarian, arbitrary government coming to power, and the need for a written constitution which would protect citizens against its oppressive measures. The subsequent affirmation of the constitutionality of the amendments in Teo Soh Lung has also been criticised as a commitment to "an anaemic version of the Rule of Law".

=== Alternative views ===
Alternative views have been expressed that the amendments were not seeking to replace the common law of judicial review. Instead, they borrowed from the common law by turning the clock back, and merely clarified the limits of judicial power in relation to the ISA. It has also been noted that the amendments do not compel the application of Lee Mau Seng, a High Court decision. If Lee Mau Seng is wrong, the Court of Appeal can still overrule it now.
