= Teo Soh Lung v Minister for Home Affairs =

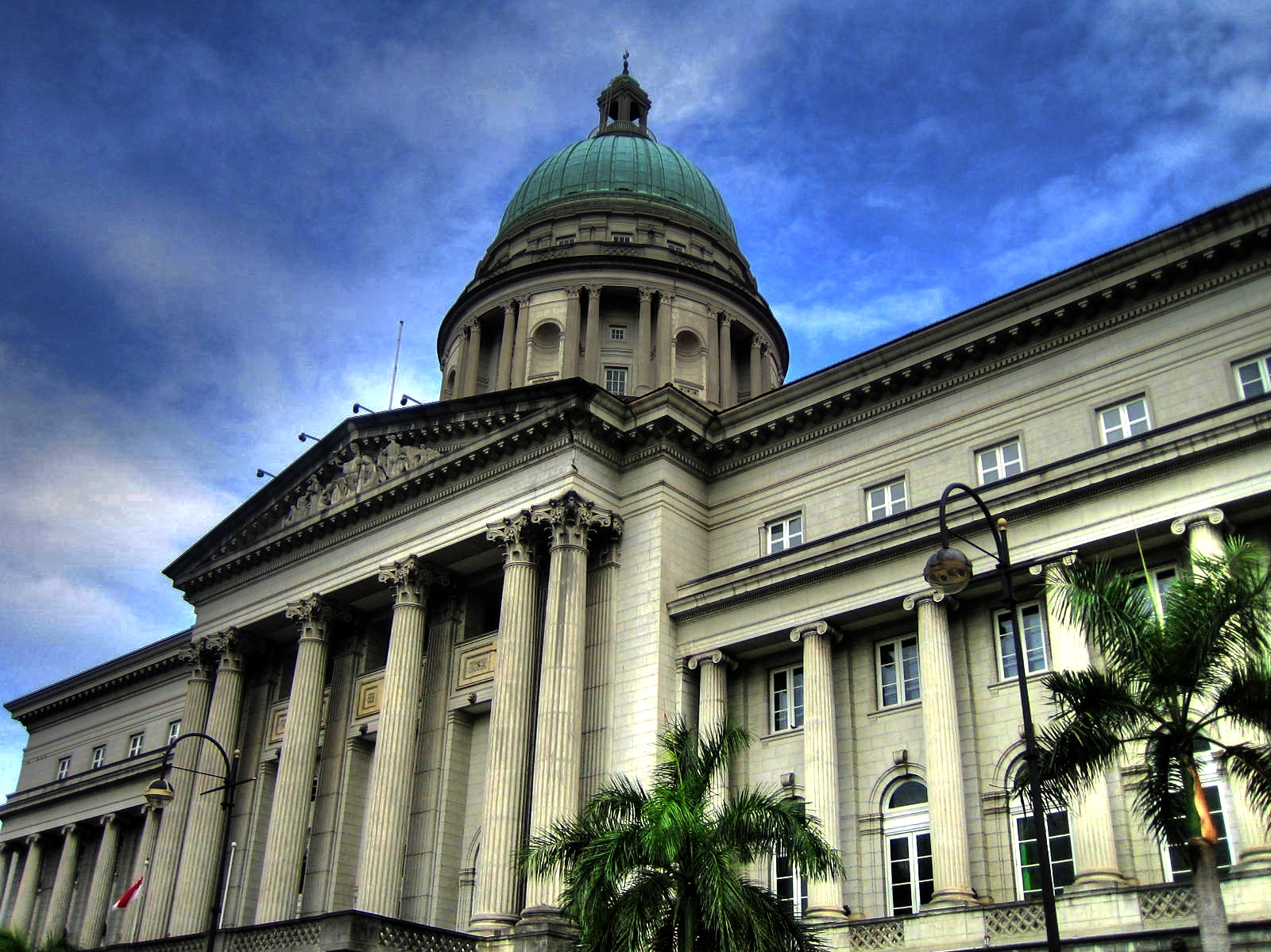
- The Old Supreme Court Building, photographed in April 2007
- Court: High Court of Singapore and Court of Appeal of Singapore
- Full case name: Teo Soh Lung v Minister for Home Affairs and others
- Decided: 25 April 1989 (H.C.); 3 April 1990 (C.A.)
- Citations: [1989] 1 S.L.R.(R.) 461, H.C.; [1990] 1 S.L.R.(R.) 347, C.A.

Case history
- Related actions: Teo Soh Lung v. Minister for Home Affairs [1988] 2 S.L.R.(R) 30, H.C.; Chng Suan Tze v. Minister for Home Affairs [1988] 2 S.L.R.(R) 525, C.A.; Cheng Vincent v. Minister for Home Affairs [1990] 1 S.L.R.(R.) 38, H.C.

Court membership
- Judges sitting: Frederick Arthur Chua J. (H.C.); Wee Chong Jin C.J., Thean Lip Ping J. and Chan Sek Keong J. (C.A.)

Case opinions
- 1989 amendments to the Constitution and the Internal Security Act (ISA) to reinstate a subjective test for judicial review of acts and decisions under the ISA were valid.

Teo Soh Lung v Minister for Home Affairs is the name of two cases of the Singapore courts, a High Court decision delivered in 1989 and the 1990 judgment in the appeal from that decision to the Court of Appeal. The cases were concerned with the constitutionality of amendments made to the Constitution of the Republic of Singapore and the Internal Security Act ("ISA") in 1989. The latter statute authorizes detention without trial on security grounds. These amendments had the effect of changing the law on judicial review of executive discretion under the ISA by re-establishing the subjective test enunciated in the 1971 High Court decision Lee Mau Seng v Minister for Home Affairs which had been overruled in 1988 by Chng Suan Tze v Minister for Home Affairs, and limiting the right of judicial review to ensuring compliance with procedures specified in the ISA. In other words, the amendments were intended to render the exercise of power by the President and the Minister for Home Affairs under the ISA to detain persons without trial not justiciable by the courts. Both the High Court and Court of Appeal found that these amendments were constitutional because Parliament had done nothing more than enact the rule of law relating to the law applicable to judicial review. Thus, the amendments validly operated to deprive the applicant Teo Soh Lung of the ability to apply to the courts for judicial review.

Another significant feature of these cases was the "basic features doctrine". A doctrine developed by the Supreme Court of India and now a part of Indian constitutional law, the High Court held that the doctrine, which curtails Parliament's ability to amend the Constitution, did not apply in Singapore as this would amount to usurpation of Parliament's legislative function contrary to Article 58 of the Constitution. A contrary opinion is that the basic features doctrine is necessary to provide a legal safeguard for the basic structure of the Constitution.

== Facts ==
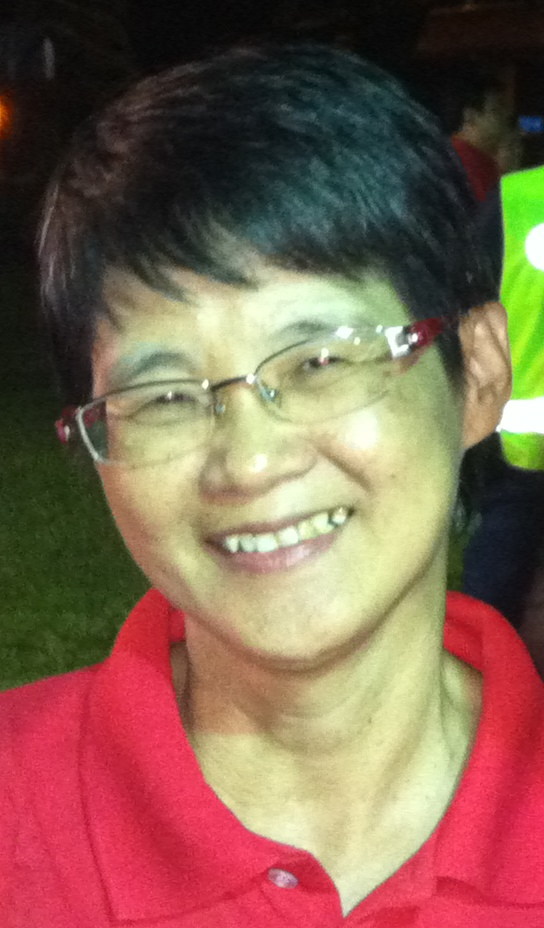
Teo stood as a candidate for the Singapore Democratic Party in the 2011 general election. She is pictured here at a rally in Clementi on 28 April 2011.

On 21 May 1987, Teo Soh Lung, a lawyer, was detained under the Internal Security Act ("ISA") of Singapore together with other persons for purported involvement in a conspiracy to overthrow the Government by force and replace it with a Marxist state. The detention order was suspended on 26 September 1987 subject to the execution of a bond and compliance with certain conditions. However, the suspension direction was later revoked by the Minister for Home Affairs on 19 April 1988 and Teo was rearrested and detained. Teo's application for a writ of habeas corpus succeeded before the Court of Appeal in Chng Suan Tze v. Minister for Home Affairs ("Chng Suan Tze") as there was insufficient evidence of the President's satisfaction that her detention without trial was necessary to prevent her from acting in a manner prejudicial to the security of Singapore or the maintenance of public order, pursuant to section 8(1) of the ISA. Although Teo was released on 8 December 1988, she was re-arrested almost immediately under a new detention order.

The Government responded to Chng Suan Tze within two weeks after the decision was made. It amended the Constitution of the Republic of Singapore and the ISA by enacting the Constitution of the Republic of Singapore (Amendment) Act 1989 and the Internal Security (Amendment) Act 1989, which respectively came into force on 27 and 30 January 1989. The amendments were expressed to operate retrospectively. The constitutional amendment inserted into Article 149 the italicized portions shown below:

Legislation against subversion

149.—(1) If an Act recites that action has been taken or threatened by any substantial body of persons, whether inside or outside Singapore —

(a) to cause, or to cause a substantial number of citizens to fear, organised violence against persons or property;
(b) to excite disaffection against the President or the Government;
(c) to promote feelings of ill-will and hostility between different races or other classes of the population likely to cause violence;
(d) to procure the alteration, otherwise than by lawful means, of anything by law established; or
(e) which is prejudicial to the security of Singapore,

any provision of that law designed to stop or prevent that action or any amendment to that law or any provision in any law enacted under clause (3) is valid notwithstanding that it is inconsistent with Article 9, 11, 12, 13 or 14, or would, apart from this Article, be outside the legislative power of Parliament.

...

(3) If, in respect of any proceedings whether instituted before or after the commencement of this clause, any question arises in any court as to the validity of any decision made or act done in pursuance of any power conferred upon the President or the Minister by any law referred to in this Article, such question shall be determined in accordance with the provisions of any law as may be enacted by Parliament for this purpose; and nothing in Article 93 shall invalidate any law enacted pursuant to this clause.

Article 149 is primarily directed against subversion and confers power on Parliament to make laws contrary to certain fundamental liberties guaranteed by the Constitution. The enactment of the ISA, which provides for detention without trial for up to two years, was a conspicuous exercise of this power. The 1989 amendments to the ISA inserted the following provisions into the Act:

Interpretation

8A. In this Part, "judicial review" includes proceedings instituted by way of —

(a) an application for any of the prerogative orders of mandamus, prohibition and certiorari;
(b) an application for a declaration or an injunction;
(c) any writ of habeas corpus; and
(d) any other suit or action relating to or arising out of any decision made or act done in pursuance of any power conferred upon the President or the Minister by any provision of this Act.

Law applicable to judicial review
8B.— (1) Subject to the provisions of subsection (2), the law governing the judicial review of any decision made or act done in pursuance of any power conferred upon the President or the Minister by the provisions of this Act shall be the same as was applicable and declared in Singapore on the 13th day of July 1971; and no part of the law before, on or after that date of any other country in the Commonwealth relating to judicial review shall apply.

(2) There shall be no judicial review in any court of any act done or decision made by the President or the Minister under the provisions of this Act save in regard to any question relating to compliance with any procedural requirement of this Act governing such act or decision.

No appeals to Privy Council
8C. Notwithstanding the provisions of any other written law, no appeal shall lie to the Judicial Committee of Her Britannic Majesty's Privy Council in any proceedings instituted by way of judicial review in respect of any decision made or act done under this Act or in respect of any question of interpretation of the provisions of Part XII of the Constitution or any law made thereunder.

Commencement provision

8D. Sections 8A, 8B and 8C shall apply to any proceedings instituted by way of judicial review of any decision made or act done under the provisions of this Act, whether such proceedings have been instituted before or after the commencement of the Internal Security (Amendment) Act 1989.

The legislative amendments were intended to revert the law to its position before Chng Suan Tze was decided, thus rendering the exercise of power by the President and the Minister under the ISA not justiciable by the courts. In addition, the addition of a reference to Articles 11 and 12 of the Constitution to Article 149(1) ensured that the ISA is valid even if it is inconsistent with five out of the eight fundamental liberties enshrined in Part IV of the Constitution. Parliament was able to pass these legislative amendments without difficulty to diminish the effect of Chng Suan Tze because a large majority of the Members of Parliament belong to one political party, the People's Action Party. Further, Singapore has a unicameral legislature, so all legislative power is concentrated in one body. The legislative body is "practically fused with the executive via the Cabinet".

In Teo Soh Lung, Teo applied again for habeas corpus to be released from detention. She sought to argue that the amendments did not deprive her of the right to judicial review of the legality, rationality and constitutionality of her detention and, in the alternative, if they did, the amendments were unconstitutional.

== High Court judgment ==
=== Exclusion of judicial review ===
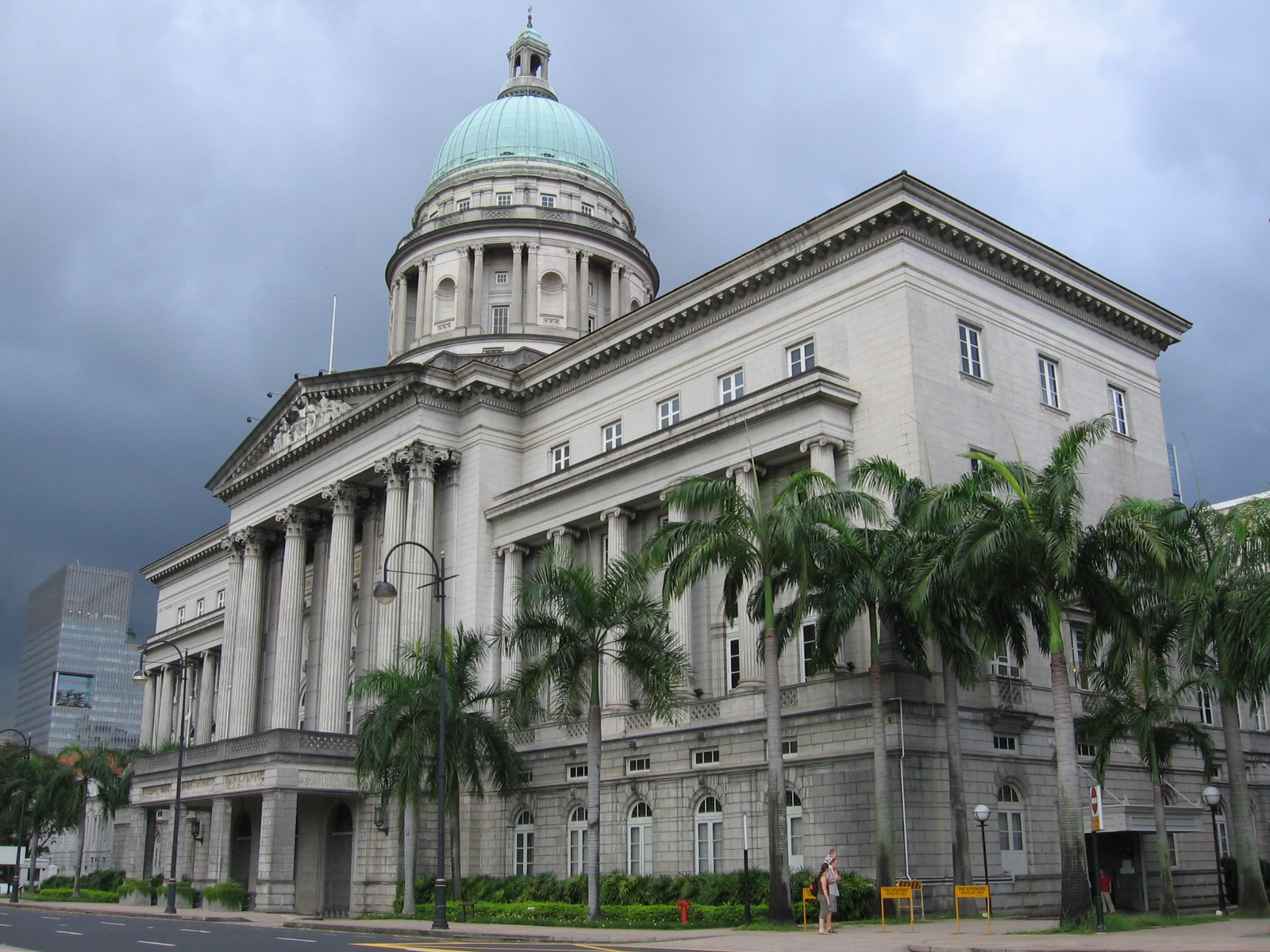
The Old Supreme Court Building, photographed in January 2006, where Teo Soh Lung's application for habeas corpus was heard by the High Court

Before the High Court, counsel for Teo, Anthony Lester Q.C., sought judicial review of the acts and decisions of the President or the Minister for Home Affairs which were purported to have been exercised under the powers conferred by section 8 of the ISA, submitting that the powers had been used for improper purposes, and in a manner which was illegal, irrational and unconstitutional. He also argued that since the Minister and the President, acting on advice of the Cabinet, had acted in bad faith and for improper purposes, they had acted outside the scope of the powers conferred by the ISA. Hence, the acts and decisions were null and void.

Justice Frederick Arthur Chua ruled that the amendments to Article 149 and to the ISA did have the effect of depriving the applicant of her right to judicial review of the legality, rationality and constitutionality of her detention under the ISA. The court observed that the Court of Appeal in Chng Suan Tze had allowed the appeal solely on a technical ground – that the respondents had not adduced sufficient evidence of the President's satisfaction. Other matters mentioned in that judgment were merely obiter dicta. Therefore, although it had been held in Chng Suan Tze that the President's satisfaction under section 8(1) of the ISA was objective and thus reviewable by the court, these observations did not apply to the present proceedings in the light of the new provisions in the ISA. Section 8B(1), which stated that the law governing the judicial review of any decision made or act done in pursuance of any power conferred upon the President or the Minister by the Act shall be the same as was applicable and declared in Singapore on 13 July 1971, reaffirmed the law governing judicial review as laid down in the High Court's 1971 decision Lee Mau Seng v. Minister for Home Affairs, which was rendered on that date. Thus, the section had the effect of making a subjective test applicable to the exercise of powers under sections 8 and 10 of the ISA. Section 8B(2) provided that there was to be judicial review only in regard to any question relating to compliance with any procedural requirement of the ISA governing such act or decision. If the discretion exercised by the President and the Minister under sections 8 and 10 was subjective, the court could not assess whether the powers conferred on the President and the Minister by sections 8 and 10 were exercised legally. The applicant had the burden of proof of showing that her detention was unlawful as the respondents had adduced a valid detention order and evidence of the President's subjective satisfaction that she should be detained. Furthermore, Lee Mau Seng had held that bad faith is not a justiciable issue in the ISA context.

Counsel for Teo argued that the House of Lords decision in Anisminic Ltd. v. Foreign Compensation Commission was applicable on the facts. In Anisminic it was held that an ouster clause in a statute does not deprive a court from exercising judicial review. Chua J. took the view that Anisminic was distinguishable. At the most, the case decided there was a presumption that an ouster clause did not prevent a court from inquiring whether a public authority had been acting outside its jurisdiction when making an administrative decision. However, it was clear from the provisions of the ISA that it was for the Executive to determine whether, as a matter of policy and judgment, certain activities were prejudicial to national security. Since the Minister had stated that the Cabinet and the President acting in accordance with the Cabinet's advice were satisfied that Teo had acted in a manner prejudicial to the security of Singapore by being involved in a Marxist conspiracy to establish a socialist state, allowing the court to investigate into the good faith of the President or the Minister would be inconsistent with the scheme intended by Parliament.

=== Constitutionality of the amendments and the basic features doctrine ===
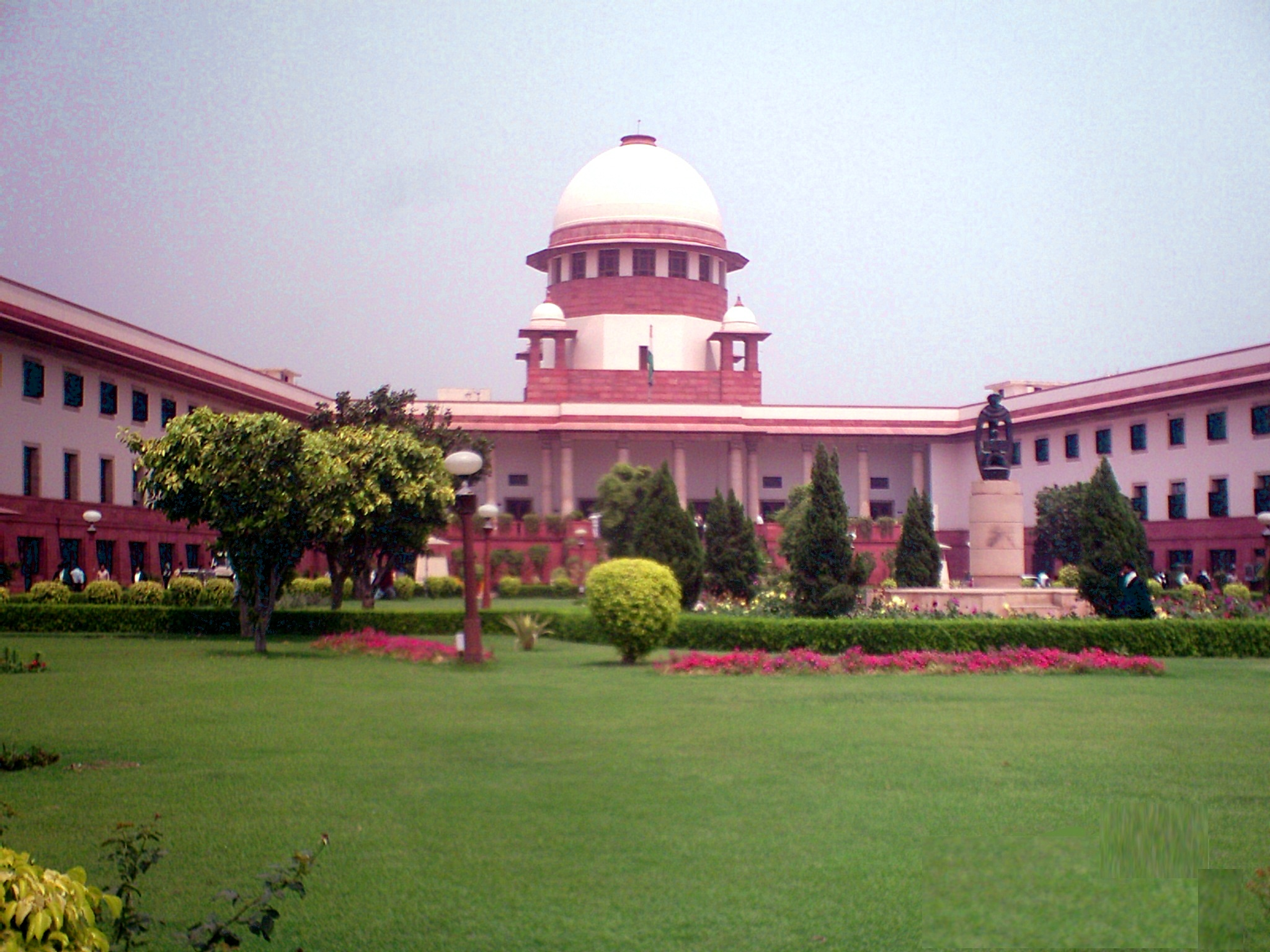
The Supreme Court of India photographed in May 2007. Counsel for Teo relied on a number of the Supreme Court's decisions to argue that Parliament could not amend the Constitution if the amendments violated the Constitution's basic structure.

Counsel for Teo also argued that the purported amendments to Article 149 of the Constitution were contrary to the supreme law of the Constitution and thus were not valid amendments. Alternatively, if the Article 149 amendments were valid, the ISA amendments did not come within the legislative powers conferred by Article 149 and were thus void. Under Article 5(1), the Constitution may be amended by a law enacted by the Legislature. However, the purported Article 149 amendments were not a "law" within the meaning of Article 5(1), as they were an attempt by the Government to cause Teo's pending court proceedings (a tort claim, a judicial review application and the present habeas corpus application) to fail. Therefore, they amounted to judicial rather legislative action. Further, relying on the Indian Supreme Court cases Kesavananda Bharati v. State of Kerala (1973), Minerva Mills Ltd. v. Union of India (1980) and P. Sambamurthy v. State of Andhra Pradesh (1986), Parliament's powers to amend the Constitution were limited by implied limitations derived from the basic structure of the Constitution itself. Since the Constitution was founded on the basis of separation of powers, Parliament was not empowered to amend the Constitution in a manner which acted retrospectively and allowed it to usurp judicial power, which amounted to judicial action.

Teo's counsel also submitted that Article 149(1) imposed the overriding requirement that legislation enacted pursuant to the new Article 149(3) had to be "designed to stop or prevent" subversive action of the kind specified in Articles 149(1)(a) to (e). The purported ISA amendments were void because they were not intended to stop or prevent subversive action. Rather, they were enacted to prevent "acts done and decisions made in bad faith, for improper purposes, irrelevant to the stopping or prevention of subversive action" from being judicially reviewed by a court, and to retrospectively deprive the applicant of the benefit of the judgment in her favour in Chng Suan Tze.

Chua J. rejected the application of the basic features doctrine in Singapore. He reasoned that a constitutional amendment, being part of the Constitution itself, can never be invalid if the procedure for amendment is complied with. If the framers of the Constitution had intended limitations on the power of amendment, they would have expressly provided for such limitations. Furthermore, if the courts were allowed to impose limitations on the legislative power to amend, they would be usurping Parliament's legislative function, contrary to Article 58. In any case, Chua J. did not agree that Parliament had violated the basic structure of the Constitution. The subjective test reinserted into the ISA had served the national security interests of Singapore for a long time. The amendments merely reaffirmed the law which the courts had followed since Lee Mau Seng, and ensured that the legislative intent behind the ISA was not disregarded. Moreover, nothing in the amendments was unrelated to national security. A reaffirmation of the original principles could not be said to be objectionable as usurping judicial power or being contrary to the rule of law. The rule of law had not been abolished by legislation, as Parliament had done no more than to enact the rule of law relating to judicial review. The legislation did not order the court to decide a case in a particular way or to dismiss it – the court was left to deal with the case on the basis of the amendments.

== Court of Appeal judgment ==
On appeal to the Court of Appeal, Teo made primarily the same arguments that had been raised before the High Court. Notably, regarding the freezing of common law via the statute, the Court of Appeal observed that the language of section 8B(1) of the ISA was plain and unambiguous, and excluded the application of any law in any Commonwealth country "before, on or after" 13 July 1971, the date of the decision of Lee Mau Seng. It reinstated Lee Mau Seng as "the applicable and declared law governing judicial review" under the ISA. The appeal was dismissed.

== Significance of the decisions ==
=== Exclusion of judicial review ===
The Teo Soh Lung decisions cannot be read apart from Chng Suan Tze and the series of legislative and constitutional amendments made by Parliament. The amendments had the effect of ousting review by the Judiciary and the Privy Council in situations of preventive detention.

Chng Suan Tze has been dubbed the "single most important constitutional decision in the Singaporean nation". It declared that the idea of any official power being non-justiciable is contrary to the Constitution. The Court's endorsement of the objective standard of review meant that judges could examine whether the Executive's action was in fact based on national security considerations, as well as whether such action fell within the scope of section 8(1) of the ISA. Chng Suan Tze departed from decades of the court abiding by the policy of non-justiciability, and held that "the notion of a subjective or unfettered discretion is contrary to the rule of law. All power has legal limits and the rule of law demands that the courts should be able to examine the exercise of discretionary power." It declared that the idea of any official power being non-justiciable violated equality before the law and equal protection of the law because a limitless power is a licence for the Executive to take arbitrary action.

Following the amendments to the Constitution and the ISA, the High Court in Teo Soh Lung had the opportunity to reassert the principles set down in Chng Suan Tze. However, it declined to strike down the amendments, instead holding that the amendments were constitutional because, among other reasons, Parliament had satisfied the formal requirements laid down in the Constitution for making the amendments. The view has been expressed that the Court took a "thin" and positivist approach, and that this reasoning seems to imply that the courts will not question any legislation as long as it is procedurally sound, a regression from Chng. Confining judicial review to ensuring compliance with procedures set out in the ISA diminishes the protective role of the Judiciary, and the Court failed to consider whether the safeguards in the ISA are sufficient once judicial supervision is removed.

Whether judicial review can be excluded through executive decision remains a live issue because the 1989 amendments to the ISA reverted the law on judicial review applicable to the ISA to the date that Lee Mau Seng was decided. However, Lee Mau Seng appears to be bad law since it was overruled by the Court of Appeal in Chng Suan Tze. Furthermore, as a High Court decision, Lee Mau Seng may not be the final word on judicial review of action taken under the ISA. In addition, if detainees allege procedural impropriety, this allows a court to consider if there are procedural defects in the Executive's decision-making process, such as the taking into account of irrelevant considerations. Finally, ouster clauses are not barriers to judicial review in modern administrative law because courts can still step in to prevent jurisdictional errors of law.

It is difficult to reconcile the Government's attempt to freeze the law relating to judicial review of acts and decisions taken under the ISA as at 13 July 1971 with doctrines such as the rule of law, judicial independence and the separation of powers. One academic view is that courts should not assume that the ISA has frozen the entirety of the law on judicial review as at 13 July 1971. This is because the statute "does not substitute a new, detailed regime covering all the various issues, such as grounds of review, the rules of natural justice, the meaning of ultra vires, remedies and locus standi". The further development of such matters in the common law should not be ignored. Furthermore, the freezing of the law rejects judicial independence. Rutter believes that as long as the subject matter of judicial review remains within the common law, "courts are the proper and only authentic expositors of what the law is at any given time".

=== Basic features doctrine ===
Teo Soh Lung is also significant because the High Court denied the application of the basic features doctrine in Singapore. This doctrine, first developed in Indian case law, prevents attempted constitutional amendments which abrogate any of its "basic structure" or "essential features" even if the procedural requirements for constitutional amendments are met. Chua J. held that the doctrine was not applicable to the Singapore Constitution: "Considering the differences in the making of the Indian and our Constitution, it cannot be said that our Parliament's power to amend our Constitution is limited in the same way as the Indian Parliament's power to amend the Indian Constitution."

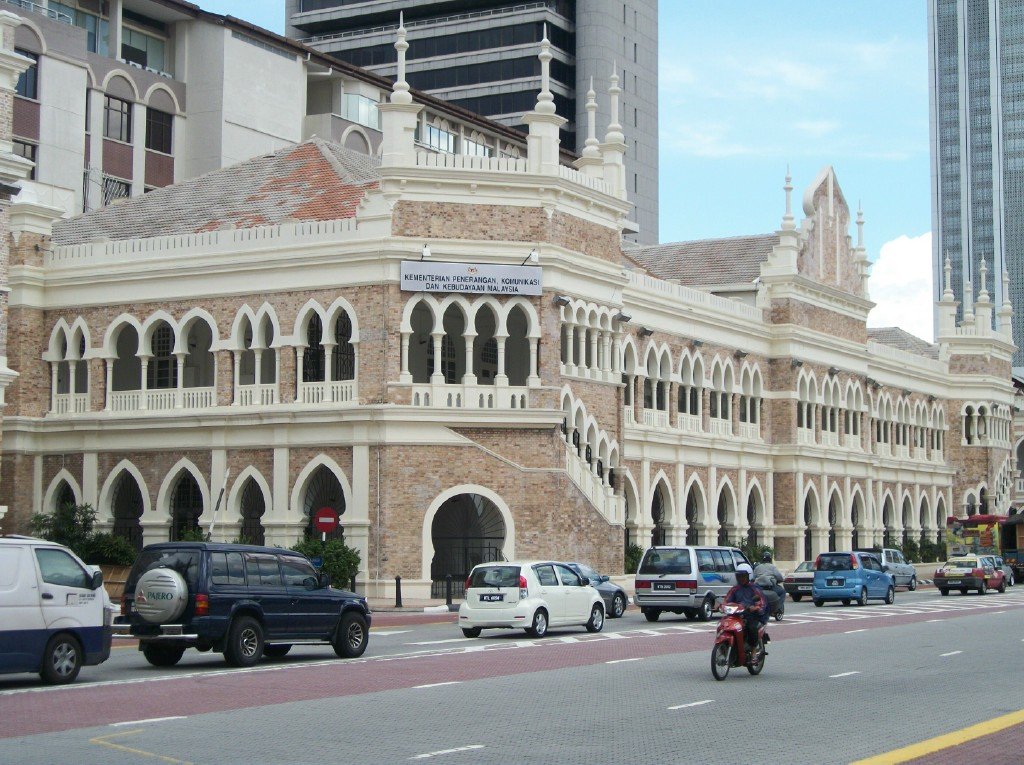
The Federal Court of Malaysia, then housed in the Sultan Abdul Samad Building in Kuala Lumpur, rejected the application of the basic features doctrine in Phang Chin Hock v. Public Prosecutor (1980). In Teo Soh Lung the High Court of Singapore declined to apply the doctrine, following the reasoning in that case.

In Malaysia, the basic features doctrine was also found to be inapplicable by the Federal Court in Phang Chin Hock v. Public Prosecutor. The Court remarked that the Indian Constitution was not drafted by "mere mortals", while the same could not be said for the Malaysian Constitution. The Indian Constitution was drafted by a constituent assembly representative of the Indian people in territorial, racial and community terms, while both the Malaysian and Singapore Constitutions were enacted by ordinary legislatures. Reliance on the drawing of distinctions between the Indian Constitution on the one hand and the Malaysian and Singapore Constitutions on the other on the basis of the history of their framing has been criticized as weak and inadequate.

A contrary opinion notes that the basic features doctrine is necessary to provide a legal safeguard for the basic structure of the Constitution. The less permanence judges attach to the Constitution the more easily it can be eroded, and the less stability is accorded to the "supreme law of the land". This fear can be reinforced by the example of Hitler's "legal" rise to power in 1933 – the lack of restrictions on constitutional amendment allowed him to diminish the Weimar Constitution and set up his dictatorship. With the dominance of one party in the Singapore Parliament, it is all the more important to protect the essential features of Singapore's Constitution.

Nonetheless, the rejection of the basic features doctrine may have paved the way for fundamental changes to be made to the Singapore Constitution over the years, including the introduction of Group Representation Constituencies, Non-constituency Members of Parliament, Nominated Members of Parliament and the Elected President. Such changes may not have happened or may have faced the possibility of being pronounced unconstitutional by the courts if the basic features doctrine was applicable in Singapore.
