= Internal Security Act (Singapore) =

Statute of the Parliament of Singapore

Internal Security Act 1960
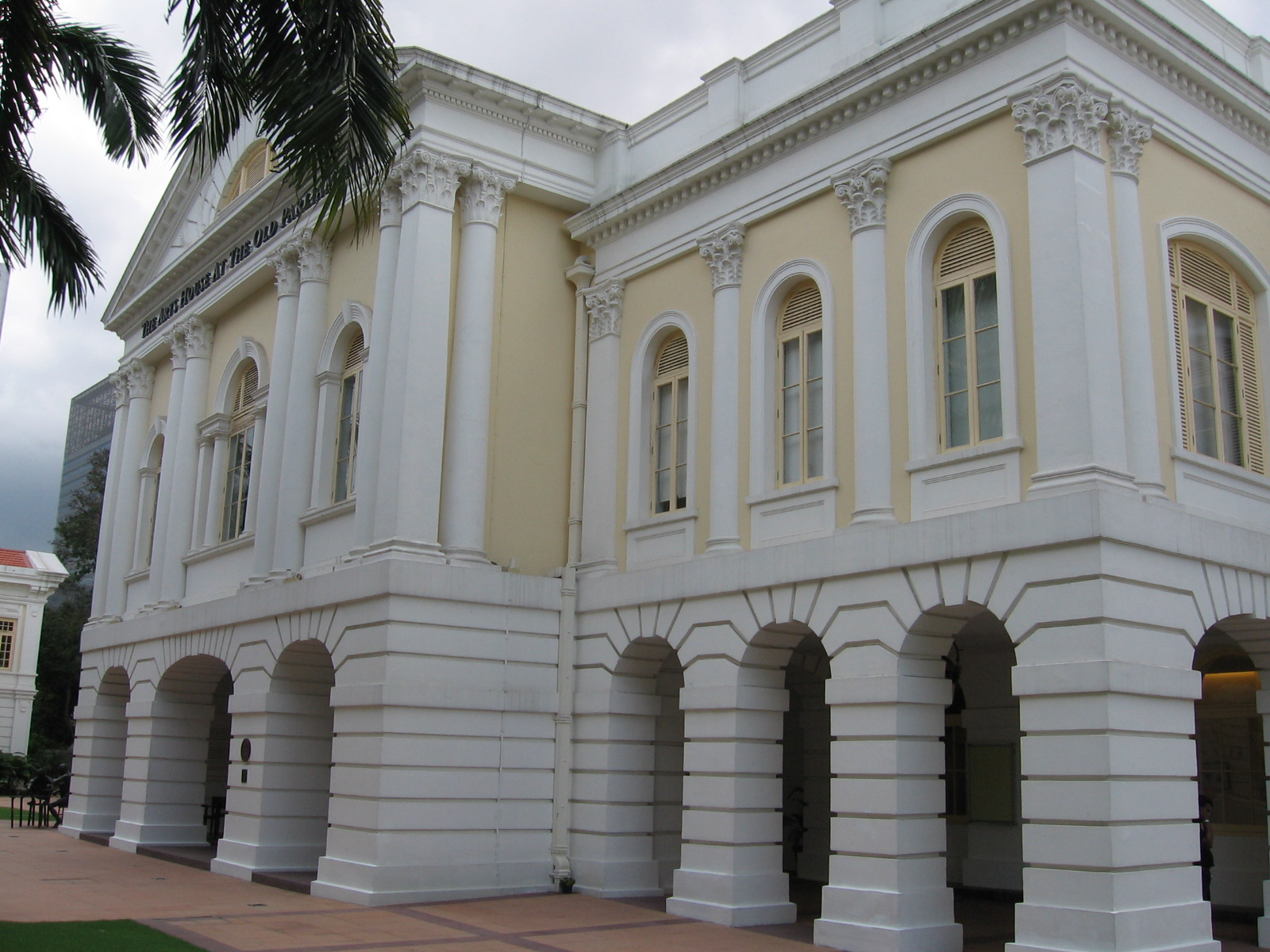

Parliament of the Federation of Malaya
- Long title: An Act to provide for the internal security of Singapore, preventive detention, the prevention of subversion, the suppression of organised violence against persons and property in specified areas of Singapore, and for matters incidental thereto.
- Citation: No. 18 of 1960 (Malaya), now Internal Security Act 1960 (Singapore)
- Territorial extent: Singapore
- Enacted by: Dewan Rakyat, Malaysia
- Enacted: 22 June 1960
- Enacted by: Dewan Negara, Malaysia
- Enacted: 6 July 1960
- Royal assent: 27 July 1960
- Commenced: Extended to Singapore on 16 September 1963 when it became part of Malaysia

Legislative history

Initiating chamber: Dewan Rakyat, Malaysia
- Bill title: Internal Security Bill 1960
- Bill citation: D.R.17/1960
- Introduced by: Tun Abdul Razak (Deputy Prime Minister)
- First reading: 20 April 1960
- Second reading: 21 June 1960–22 June 1960
- Third reading: 22 June 1960

Revising chamber: Dewan Negara, Malaysia
- Bill title: Internal Security Bill 1960
- Bill citation: D.R.17/1960
- Member(s) in charge: Leong Yew Koh (Minister of Justice)
- First reading: 29 June 1960
- Second reading: 6 July 1960
- Third reading: 6 July 1960
- Status: In force

The Internal Security Act 1960 (ISA) of Singapore is a statute that grants the executive power to enforce preventive detention, prevent subversion, suppress organised violence against persons and property, and do other things incidental to the internal security of Singapore. The present Act was originally enacted by the Parliament of Malaysia as the Internal Security Act 1960 (No. 18 of 1960), and extended to Singapore on 16 September 1963 when Singapore became a state of Malaysia.

Before a person can be detained under the ISA by the Minister for Home Affairs, the President must be satisfied that such detention is necessary for the purposes of national security or public order. In the landmark case of Chng Suan Tze v. Minister for Home Affairs (1988), the Court of Appeal sought to impose legal limits on the power of preventive detention by requiring the government to adduce objective facts which justified the President's satisfaction. Two months after the decision, a series of legislative and constitutional amendments was enacted that effectively reversed the Chng Suan Tze decision. These amendments were subsequently confirmed to be valid by the High Court and Court of Appeal in Teo Soh Lung v. Minister for Home Affairs (1989–1990), which held that it was sufficient for the President to be subjectively satisfied that a detainee is a threat to national security in order for a detention order to be issued under the ISA.

Notable ISA cases include Operation Coldstore in 1963, which led to the arrests of more than 100 left-wing politicians and trade unionists, including members of socialist opposition party Barisan Sosialis. Chia Thye Poh, an alleged Communist, was detained and subject to other restrictions on his liberty under the ISA from 1966 to 1998. The Chng Suan Tze and Teo Soh Lung cases resulted from a 1987 security operation called Operation Spectrum, in which 22 individuals were arrested and accused of being members of a Marxist conspiracy. The ISA also empowers the authorities to prohibit political and quasi-military organisations, ban subversive documents and publications, shut down entertainments and exhibitions that are or are likely to be detrimental to the national interest, and to suppress organised violence by declaring parts of Singapore to be security areas.

== History and developments ==
British colonial Malaya introduced the Emergency Regulations Ordinance 1948 on 7 July 1948 during the Malayan Emergency in response to a Communist uprising and guerrilla war. The regulations allowed the police to arrest anybody suspected of having acted or being likely to act in a way that would threaten security without evidence or a warrant, hold them incommunicado for investigation, and detain them indefinitely without the detainee ever being charged with a crime or tried in a court of law. In 1955, the Emergency Regulations were succeeded by the Preservation of Public Security Ordinance (PPSO), which was introduced by the Labour Front government as a result of the 1955 Hock Lee bus riots. Strong criticism of the PPSO came by the then-opposition People's Action Party (PAP). In 1958, the PAP's Lee Kuan Yew accused the Lim Yew Hock government of using the PPSO to stifle political dissent.

In 1960, three years after Malaya's independence, the Emergency was declared over. However, the Malayan Internal Security Act 1960 (ISA) was passed in place of the PPSO with much of the same powers. During parliamentary debates on the Act, Malayan prime minister Tunku Abdul Rahman stated that the ISA would only be applied against only the remaining Communist insurgents. The Malayan Communist Party (MCP) and its insurgents eventually surrendered in 1989. The Malayan ISA was drafted by British lawyer Hugh Hickling; in 1989, he commented his displeasure of its use "against political opponents, welfare workers and others dedicated to nonviolent, peaceful activities". When Singapore formed the federation of Malaysia – together with Malaya, Sabah, and Sarawak – in 1963, the Malayan ISA was extended to Singapore. The Act was retained in Singapore even after its separation from Malaysia in 1965. The current version of the Act is known as Chapter 143 of the 1985 Revised Edition.

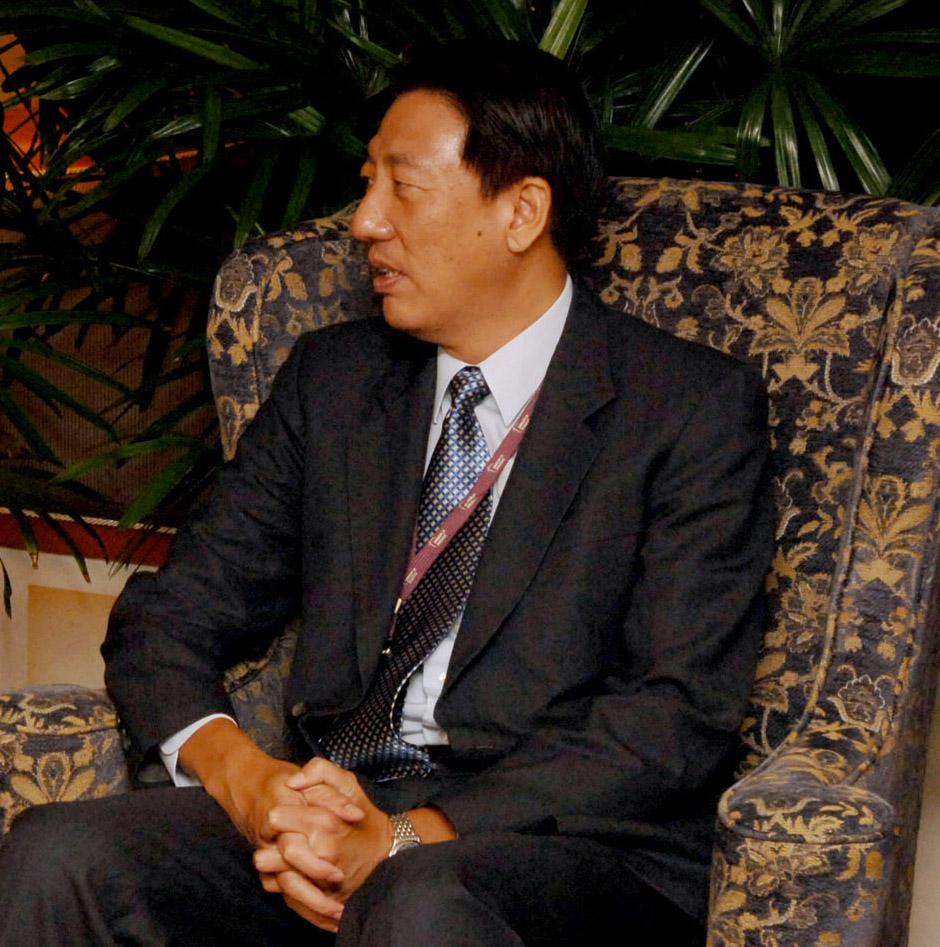
Home affairs minister Teo Chee Hean (pictured) justified the ISA in Parliament in 2011

In September 2011, the debate over whether the ISA should be retained was re-opened after Malaysia announced that it was considering repealing the ISA. Malaysian prime minister Najib Razak stated that the Act would be abolished and replaced by new laws to safeguard peace and order. The ISA was finally replaced and repealed by the Security Offences (Special Measures) Act 2012 on 31 July 2012 in Malaysia. The legitimacy and relevance of the ISA were subsequently debated by former ISA detainees, the Singapore government, and others. On 18 October 2011, Singaporean politician Janil Puthucheary stated in Parliament that although he was uncomfortable with detention without trial, he believed national security should take priority. However, he did support including stronger protections against the Act's misuse and discussing it more openly.

The following day, deputy prime minister and home affairs minister Teo Chee Hean explained the relevance of the ISA and its powers of preventive detention, as it had initially been used against communist threats in the 1960s and was later used against espionage and terrorism. He stated that preventive detention allowed authorities to act against security threats before they were committed, particularly in cases involving confidential information that could not be publicly disclosed. Opposition political parties have called for the ISA to be abolished. In its manifesto for the 2011 general election, the Workers' Party (WP) said that specific anti-terrorism and anti-espionage laws, which allow arrests and detention without trial only under strict conditions, should be enacted to replace the ISA. The National Solidarity Party took a similar stance in February 2013. Ahead of the 2025 general election, the WP again included repealing the act in its manifesto.

== Legislative authority for enactment ==
The legislative authority for the enactment of the ISA is Article 149 of the Constitution of Singapore, which appears in Part XII ("Special Powers against Subversion and Emergency Powers"). Entitled "Legislation against subversion", Article 149 states:

(1) If an Act recites that action has been taken or threatened by any substantial body of persons, whether inside or outside Singapore —

(a) to cause, or to cause a substantial number of citizens to fear, organised violence against persons or property;
(b) to excite disaffection against the President or the Government;
(c) to promote feelings of ill-will and hostility between different races or other classes of the population likely to cause violence;
(d) to procure the alteration, otherwise than by lawful means, of anything by law established; or
(e) which is prejudicial to the security of Singapore,

any provision of that law designed to stop or prevent that action or any amendment to that law or any provision in any law enacted under clause (3) is valid notwithstanding that it is inconsistent with Article 9, 11, 12, 13 or 14, or would, apart from this Article, be outside the legislative power of Parliament.

(2) A law containing such a recital as is mentioned in clause (1) shall, if not sooner repealed, cease to have effect if a resolution is passed by Parliament annulling such law, but without prejudice to anything previously done by virtue thereof or to the power of Parliament to make a new law under this Article.

(3) If, in respect of any proceedings whether instituted before or after 27th January 1989, any question arises in any court as to the validity of any decision made or act done in pursuance of any power conferred upon the President or the Minister by any law referred to in this Article, such question shall be determined in accordance with the provisions of any law as may be enacted by Parliament for this purpose; and nothing in Article 93 shall invalidate any law enacted pursuant to this clause.

To satisfy the requirements of Article 149(1), the preamble to the Malaysian ISA, which has been retained in Singapore's ISA, contains the following recital:

Whereas action has been taken by a substantial body of persons to cause a substantial number of citizens to fear organised violence against persons and property:

And Whereas action has been taken and threatened by a substantial body of persons which is prejudicial to the security of Malaya:

And Whereas Parliament considers if necessary to stop or prevent that action:

Now therefore pursuant to Article 149 of the Constitution be it enacted by the Duli Yang Maha Mulia Seri Paduka Baginda Yang di-Pertuan Agong with the advice and consent of the Dewan Negara and Dewan Ra'ayat in Parliament assembled, and by the authority of the same, as follows ...

== Provisions relating to internal security ==
Part II of the ISA, the first substantive part of the Act, contains provisions relating to internal security. It is divided into six chapters:

I. Prohibition of organisations and associations of a political or quasi-military character and uniforms, etc.
II. Powers of preventive detention.
III. Special powers relating to subversive publications, etc.
IV. Control of entertainments and exhibitions.
V. Other powers for the prevention of subversion.
VI. Miscellaneous.

=== Prohibition of political or quasi-military organizations ===
Chapter I of Part II of the ISA empowers the Minister for Home Affairs to take action against political or quasi-military organisations and associations. It is a criminal offence to be a member or adherent of any association of persons who are organised, trained, or equipped to enable them to be employed "in usurping the functions of the police or of the Singapore Armed Forces" or "for the purpose of enabling them to be employed for the use or display of physical force in promoting any political or other object, or in such a manner as to arouse reasonable apprehension that they are organised or trained or equipped for that purpose". It is a more serious crime to promote or conspire with someone else to promote, or to participate in the control or management of, the association, or to organize or train any member or adherent of the association.

The universal symbols of Communism – the five-pointed red star and the hammer and sickle – are prohibited if used in a manner deemed "prejudicial" to the national interests of Singapore.

The Minister is empowered to prohibit any clothing worn in public by members or adherents of a political or quasi-military association involved in such activities, or any clothing indicating an association with a political organisation or with the promotion of a political object. Wearing such clothing is considered an offence. In addition, if the Minister considers it to be in the national interest to do, he may prohibit the "manufacture, sale, use, wearing, display or possession of any flag, banner, badge, emblem, device, uniform or distinctive dress or any part thereof". Currently, the only emblem or device that is prohibited is one "in the form of a 5-pointed red star or a hammer and sickle in circumstances which raise a reasonable presumption that the emblem or device was intended or was likely to be used in a manner prejudicial to the interests of Singapore or to promote or foster a purpose prejudicial to or incompatible with peace, welfare or good order in Singapore".

It is a crime to be present at or to attend any meeting or assembly that aims to train or drill participants "in the use of arms [...] or for the purpose of practising military exercises, movements or evolutions". It is also a crime to train or drill others in these manners or to take part in the control or management of an association whose members are so trained. The prohibition does not apply to members of the Singapore Armed Forces, the police, a legally constituted volunteer or local force, a visiting force lawfully present in the country, or any organisation or association exempted by the Minister.

=== Preventive detention ===
Chapter II of Part II of the ISA, which allows for preventive detention (also known as detention without trial), is the most conspicuous feature of the Act. It confers on the executive a discretionary power to arrest and detain without trial, when necessary, a person with a view to prevent "that person from acting in any manner prejudicial to the security of Singapore or any part thereof or to the maintenance of public order or essential services therein". For the purposes of this provision, essential services means services relating to water, electricity, public health, fire, prisons, post, telephony, telegraphy, radio communication (including broadcasting and television), ports, docks, harbours, public transport, and the bulk distribution of fuel and lubricants. Instead of detaining a person for the purposes mentioned above, the executive may impose other restrictions upon the person's liberty such as curfews, requiring the reporting of their movements, prohibiting the person from speaking at public meetings or taking part in political activities, and travelling beyond Singapore or any part of the country.

==== Procedure ====
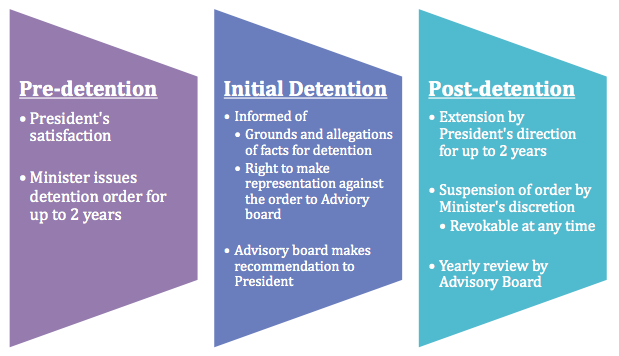
A summary of the procedure for preventive detention under the ISA

Before a person can be detained under the ISA, the President must be satisfied that such detention is necessary for the purposes of national security or public order. This is a precondition for the valid exercise by the Minister for Home Affairs of the power to order the detention. The detention order is supplemented by section 74 of the ISA which empowers the police to arrest and detain any person pending enquiries without a warrant under section 8.

Once an individual has been detained, there are administrative processes which the executive is required to follow under sections 9, 11, and 12 of the Act. The detainee is to be informed of the grounds of detention as soon as possible, unless their disclosure is against the national interest. They are to be served with a copy of the detention order as well as the grounds and allegations of fact on which the detention order was made.

The detainee is also to be informed within 14 days of their right to make representations against the order to an advisory board, which is required to hear and consider the detainee's representations. Each advisory board is chaired by a Supreme Court judge appointed by the President, and has two other members appointed by the President in consultation with the Chief Justice. The board has the powers of a court to summon and examine witnesses, and to order that documents be produced. It evaluates the evidence and must make recommendations to the President concerning the matter within three months of the date of detention. When the advisory board recommends the release of the detainee against the Minister's decision, the President exercises personal discretion whether the detainee should be released. Before exercising his discretion, the President is required to consult the Council of Presidential Advisers.

Non-citizens detained under the ISA do not have a right to make representations to an advisory board. They may, within two months from the date of the detention order, make written representations to the Minister. The Minister may, but is not bound to, refer the representations to an advisory board. Any decision on such representations by the Minister is final and cannot be called into question in any court. The burden of proving that a person is a citizen lies on the person claiming to be one, and again the Minister's decision on the matter is final.

The initial order of the Minister for Home Affairs may direct that an individual be detained for up to two years. This may be further extended by directions issued by the President for further periods of up to two years at a time. The Minister is empowered with discretion to suspend a detention order, but also has the authority to revoke the suspension at any time, which reactivates the detention order. Detention orders must be reviewed at least once every 12 months by an advisory board which thereafter makes its recommendation to the Minister. If an advisory board recommends the release of a detainee and the Minister disagrees, the President may exercise personal discretion to order the release. The requirement for regular reviews of detention orders does not apply to detainees who are not citizens. When a detention order is extended, the Minister is not required to provide the detainee with the grounds justifying the extension order or give the detainee an opportunity to appeal against the extension.

==== Criticisms of preventive detention ====
In 2006, the United States Department of State noted that although the ISA had not been used against the Singapore government's political opponents for some time, prior references had occasionally been made by the government threatening speeches deemed critical with the ISA. The government itself has regularly raised the need to prevent national security threats from materialising as a justification for preventive detention. However, the lawyer Michael Hor suggests that the criminal law is apt for dealing with such a matter. Crimes of accessory liability such as abetment, conspiracy, and unlawful assembly in the Penal Code may apply even if harm has not actualized. Furthermore, restrictions imposed by the Societies Act, as well as the offences in the Sedition Act, may be viable alternatives to preventive detention.

Preventive detention has been preferred over open court trials, as it has been suggested that the criminal trial could be used as a platform for radicals to publicise their views, and that it might confer the honour of martyrdom on accused persons. However, it has been suggested by the author Yang Zhiliang that an open trial which details the impact of terrorism could educate the public and potentially unite the various communities in the country. Under the framework of the ISA, detainees are theoretically accorded due process. For instance, detainees have a right to make representations against their detention to an advisory board. However, Article 151(3) of the Constitution prevents any government authority from disclosing any information which would, "in its own opinion, be against national interest". Therefore, there are no means to compel the authorities to disclose information which may be pertinent for the detainee to make a proper representation to an advisory board, thus compromising due process.

Moreover, the secrecy of advisory board hearings has been criticised as it may lead to the public questioning the legitimacy of the hearings, and to an impression that justice has not manifestly been done. Due to the limited form of judicial review available under the ISA, whether a person remains under detention depends largely on the Ministry of Home Affairs. This raises the question quis custodiet ipsos custodes?, as if preventive detention is applied illegitimately in a manner that cripples lawful democratic opposition, the absence of judicial review would preclude the exposure of such abuse. It has been submitted that the voice of public opinion is most suited for this purpose.

=== Subversive documents ===
Under Chapter III of Part II of the ISA, the minister responsible for printing presses and publications – currently the Minister for Communications and Information – is authorised to ban documents and publications that are subversive or otherwise undesirable. The Minister may prohibit (absolutely or conditionally) the printing, publication, distribution, or possession of any document that incites violence, encourages disobedience to the law or lawful orders, is likely to disturb public order or promote hostility between racial or social groups, or is prejudicial to Singapore's national interest, public order, or security.

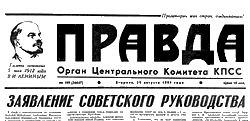
The masthead of a 1950s issue of the Russian newspaper Pravda, which is a periodical publication prohibited under the ISA

The prohibition order extends to any previous or future issue of a periodical publication, along with other publications which have been published under the same publisher which issued the prohibited publication. It is a criminal offence to print, publish, sell, issue, circulate, reproduce, or possess a prohibited publication or an extract from it; and to import, abet the importation of, or have in one's possession any imported prohibited publication. A person is presumed to know the contents and nature of a publication once it comes into their possession. However, this presumption may be rebutted if it can be proven that the publication was distributed without their authority, consent, or knowledge, and that they had no reason to suspect its nature. Among the publications that have been interdicted under the Act are works by Vladimir Lenin and Mao Zedong, and the Russian political newspaper Pravda.

A crime is committed if any person posts or distributes a document which contains an incitement to violence, encourages disobedience to the law, or is likely to lead to a breach of the peace. Spreading false reports or making false statements likely to cause public alarm is also an offence. It is also an offence to carry or have in one's possession or under one's control a subversive document. A document is deemed to be subversive if it tends to encourage violence, support actions against the country's security or public order, promote disobedience to the law or lawful orders, or solicit support or funds for persons involved in such unlawful activities.

A document that purports to be a subversive document is presumed to be one until the contrary has been proved, and if it is proved that a person was handling a subversive document, they are considered to know of its contents and nature. Nevertheless, a person may defend themself by proving that they were unaware of the contents and the nature of the contents of the document, and that they did not have reasonable cause to believe or suspect that the document was subversive. The ISA places a duty on any person who receives a subversive document to deliver it to a police officer without delay. Failure to do so without police authorisation, or communicating the contents of such a document to others or publishing them is an offence.

=== Control of entertainments and exhibitions ===
The Home Affairs Minister may, under Chapter IV of Part II of the ISA, order that any entertainment or exhibition be closed if it "is or is likely to be in any way detrimental to the national interest". Entertainment is defined by the Act as "any game, sport, diversion, concert or amusement of any kind to which the public has or is intended to have access and in which members of the public may or may not take part, whether on payment or otherwise", while exhibition "includes every display of goods, books, pictures, films or articles to which the public has or is intended to have access, whether on payment or otherwise". It is an offence to promote, assist in promoting, or operate premises used for an entertainment or exhibition held in violation of a closure order. However, it is a defence if it can be proven that the event was conducted without their knowledge, consent, or authority, and that they exercised due care and were not negligent.

Alternatively, to ensure that an entertainment or exhibition is not detrimental to the public interest, the Minister can impose conditions relating to the holding of the event on its promoter, people assisting in its promotion, and the operator of the premises. Failure to comply with any of such conditions is an offence, unless the person involved is able to show they were not responsible for the breach and exercised due care and caution. The authorities are empowered to close an entertainment or exhibition operated in breach of any condition, or kept open in contravention of an order by the Minister.

To enable the Minister to determine whether an entertainment or exhibition should be banned or allowed to be held subject to conditions, the Minister can require that its promoter, people assisting in its promotion, and the operator of the premises provide information on those involved in the organisation and participation, the interests they represent, how any profits are used, and any other matters specified by the Minister. Furnishing false or incomplete information is an offence, and also entitles the Minister to prohibit an event from being held or direct it to be closed. The person providing the information also commits a crime if the event is held in a manner contrary to the information provided.

=== Other powers ===
Chapter VI of Part II of the ISA confers additional powers on the Home Affairs Minister to prevent subversion. If a written law confers power on a person, body, or authority to appoint people to positions, the Minister can order the list of applicants from which the appointment will be made, and other information. The Minister can then direct that people whose appointment would go against the interests of Singapore to not be instated. Furthermore, no person is permitted to disclose any communication received from the Minister except in the course of official duty. The Minister may order the closure of a school or educational institution for up to six months if it is being used in a way that is considered harmful to Singapore's interests or the public, for instruction deemed harmful to pupils or the public, or as a meeting place for an unlawful society. The school's board may object to the order to the President, whose decision is final and may not be questioned in any court. The Minister's power does not extend to places where the teaching "is of a purely religious character, or for a purely religious purpose".

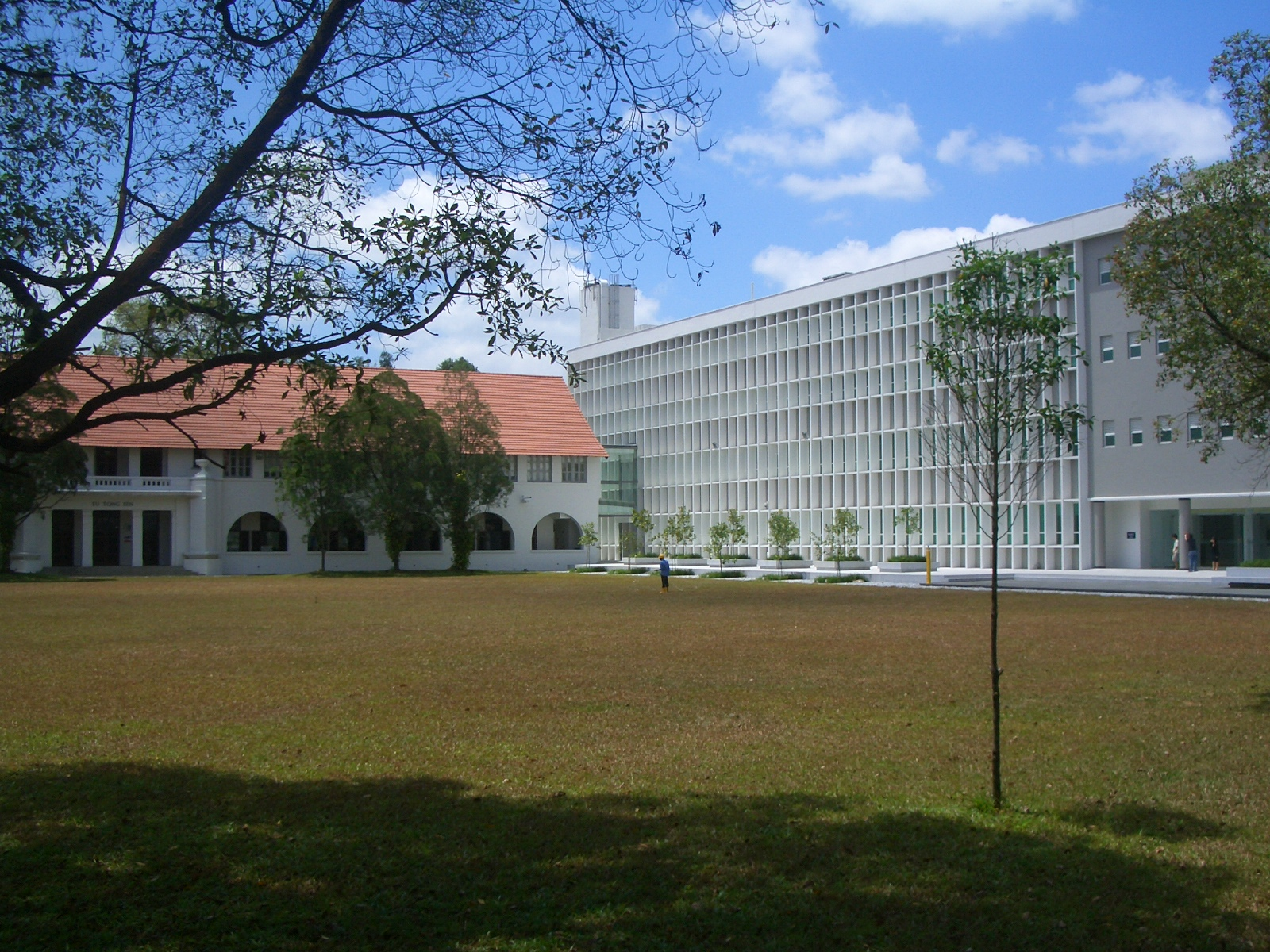
The Faculty of Law of the National University of Singapore. Under the ISA, people can be required to obtain certificates of suitability for admission to institutions of higher learning.

A person who requires a certificate of suitability for admission to an institution of higher education must apply to the Director of Education, who must not issue a certificate if they reasonably believe that the applicant would be likely to go against Singapore's interests and security. A person who does not hold a certificate of suitability may not be admitted to an institution of higher learning as a student. A person who has been refused a certificate may appeal to the Minister, whose decision on the matter is final and cannot be called into question in any court.

The Minister can forbid pupils, students, teachers, or members of educational institutions or student organisations outside Singapore – whether individually or in groups – from entering or travelling within Singapore unless police permission has been obtained. An individual pupil, student, teacher or member can also be barred from Singapore if they intend to carry out within the country a common goal of the group to which they belong. The police can grant permission for such travel subject to conditions.

If the Commissioner of Police has reason to believe that a person subject to a travel restriction order has entered Singapore without complying with its conditions, has not been resident for more than three months, does not hold a valid Singapore identity card with a local address, or has breached the conditions of the order, the Commissioner may require the person to leave Singapore and remain outside for up to six months. Alternatively, the person may be taken into custody and removed from Singapore, in which case they must remain outside Singapore for up to six months. Failure to comply with any order by the Minister or a breach of the conditions of any permission to travel to Singapore is an offence. The above provisions do not authorise the removal from Singapore of any citizen of Singapore ordinarily resident in the country.

== Scope of judicial review of ISA orders ==
Under administrative law, judicial review is an exercise in which the High Court scrutinises the executive's decisions and orders to ensure that they conform with the law. If the decisions and orders are not authorised by statute or if they have been made in contravention of administrative law principles, the Court can invalidate them. Similarly, if any exercise of power by an executive body contravenes the Constitution, the Court has a duty to declare it invalid.

=== History ===
==== Before 1988: Lee Mau Seng v. Minister for Home Affairs ====
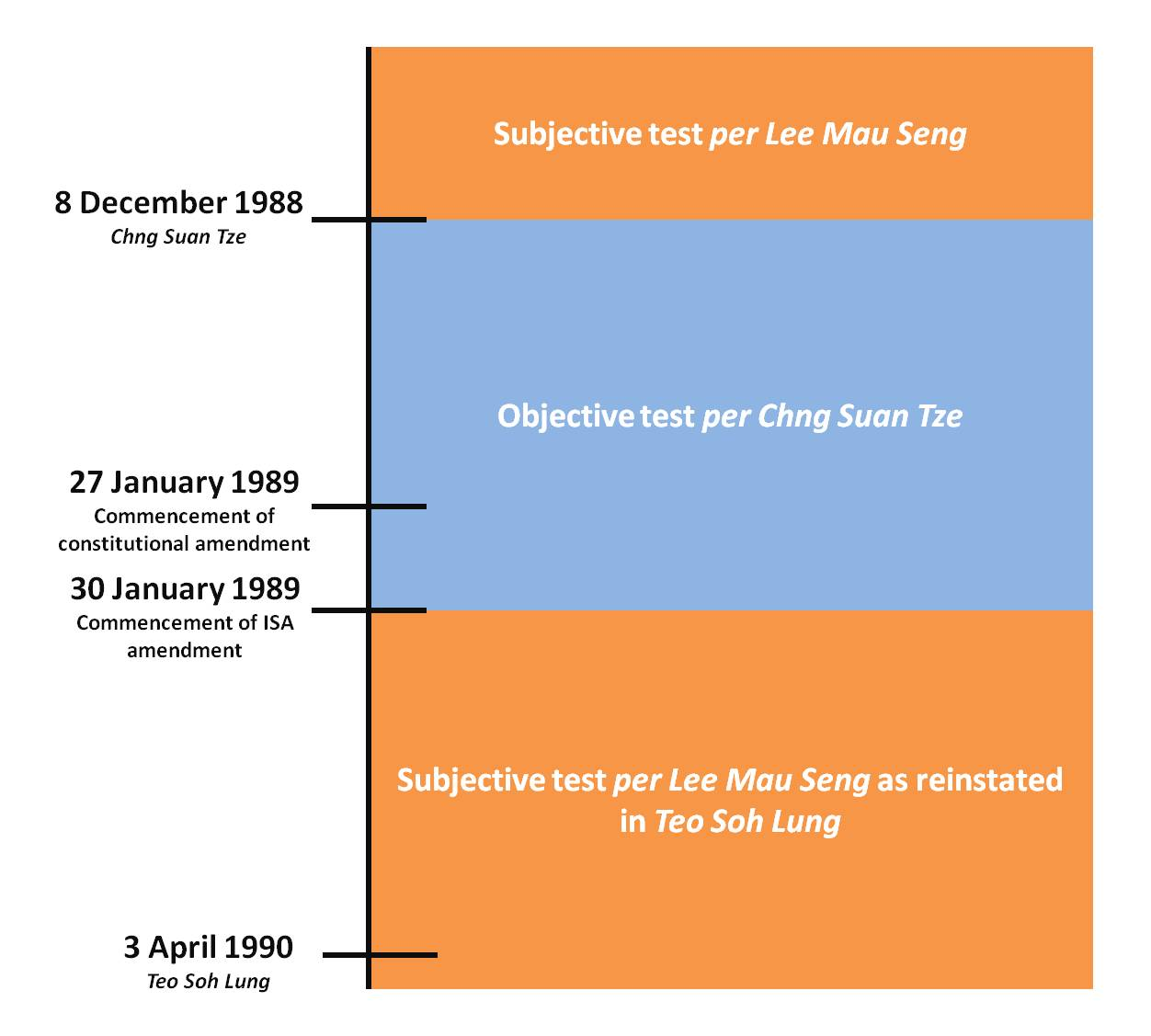
Timeline of legal developments concerning the exercise of discretion under the ISA

Prior to 1988, the Singapore case of Lee Mau Seng v. Minister for Home Affairs (1971) was authority for the application of the subjective discretion test for judicial review of executive power exercised under the ISA. The subjective test precludes the court from inquiring into the facts and grounds that are relied upon by the executive body in exercising its discretion. It is based on the literal interpretation of the words "[i]f the President is satisfied" that appear in section 8 of the ISA, such that no more is required than the subjective satisfaction of the President. This reasoning applies similarly to section 10 of the ISA, which requires the Minister's satisfaction for the suspension of detention orders.

==== 1988–1989: Chng Suan Tze v. Minister for Home Affairs ====
In a 1988 case, the Court of Appeal expanded the scope of judicial review by adopting an objective test when reviewing the exercise of executive discretion. In contrast to the subjective test, the objective test permitted the court to examine whether the decision-maker's satisfaction was based on objective facts which fell within the scope of the purposes specified by the ISA. However, the subjective test was rejected by the Court of Appeal for multiple reasons, including that it would render the provision unconstitutional. Furthermore, the Court rejected the subjective test on the basis that "the notion of a subjective or unfettered discretion is contrary to the rule of law", which required the courts to examine the exercise of discretionary power and ensure that executive power is exercised within its legal limits.

The Court of Appeal also held that legal precedents from other Commonwealth jurisdictions – such as in Liversidge v. Anderson (1941) – supported a rejection of the subjective test in favour of the objective test. Although sections 8 and 10 of the ISA concern matters of national security, the Court held that this concern does not preclude the objective review of executive discretion. Following the case of Council of Civil Service Unions v. Minister for the Civil Service (1983), the Court of Appeal decided that it was up to the courts to determine whether a decision is in fact based on grounds of national security. Similarly, it should also be within the court's purview to determine whether the matters relied upon in exercising powers under the ISA fall within the scope of purposes specified by sections 8 and 10.

==== 1989 amendments and Teo Soh Lung v. Minister for Home Affairs ====
Following the decision in Chng Suan Tze, Parliament subsequently passed the Constitution of the Republic of Singapore (Amendment) Act 1989 and the Internal Security (Amendment) Act 1989, which restored the prior 1971 legal position, when Lee Mau Seng was decided. In Teo Soh Lung v. Minister for Home Affairs (1990), the Court of Appeal held that these amendments reinstated the legal position established in Lee Mau Seng, thus prompting a return to the subjective test in reviewing the exercise of executive discretion under the ISA.

In Teo Soh Lung, the Court of Appeal held that it was not necessary for it to decide if the subjective test in Lee Mau Seng precluded judicial review in the case. Hence, the position remained to be confirmed by the courts. The test for judicial review on matters not relating to the ISA remained the objective test. In Kamal Jit Singh v. Minister for Home Affairs (1992), the High Court held that validity of detention under the Criminal Law (Temporary Provisions) Act is not dependent on the Minister's subjective satisfaction. Rather, the Minister must be objectively satisfied that the person was associated with criminal activities.

=== Academic views ===
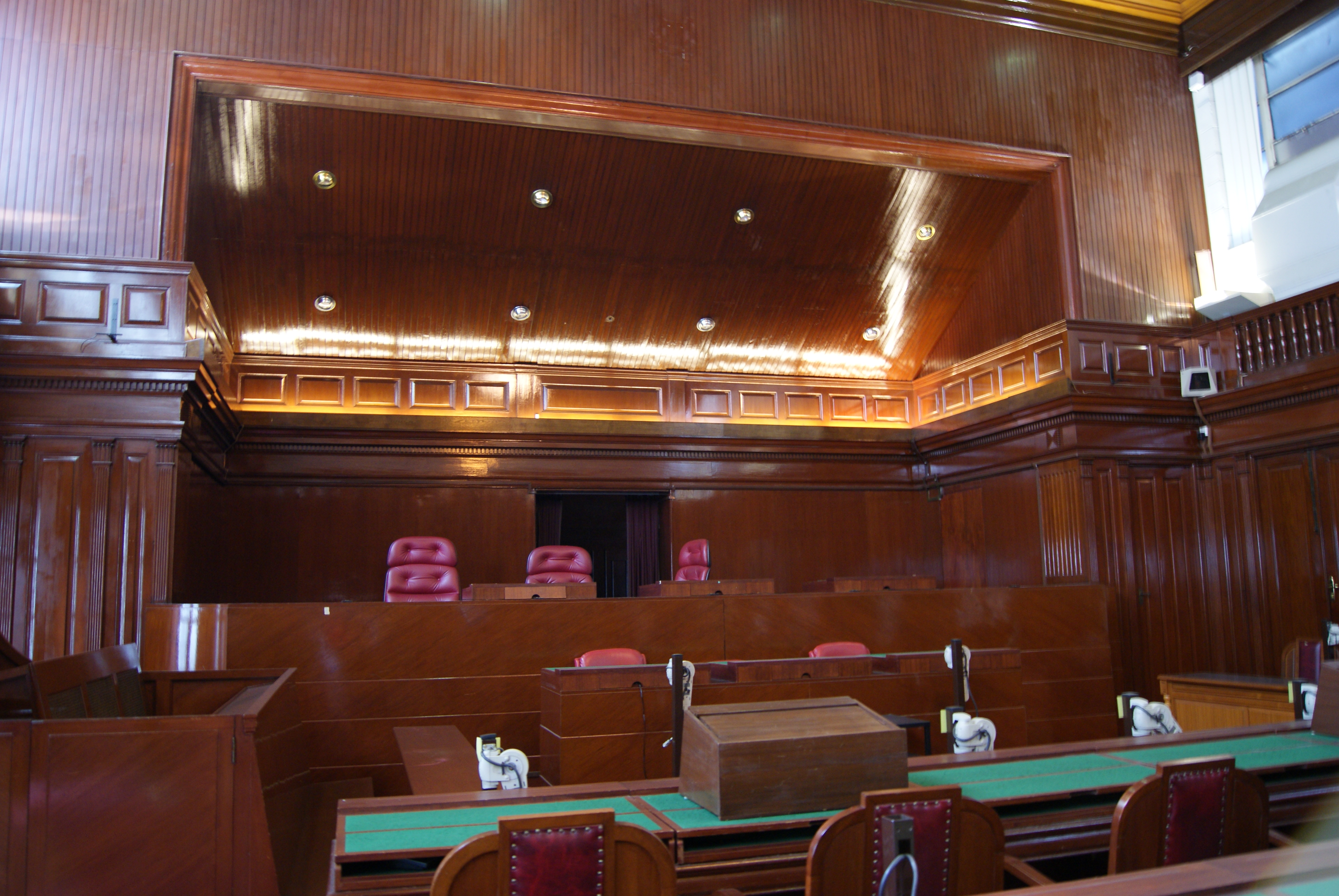
The courtroom of the Court of Appeal in the Old Supreme Court Building

While the current law in Singapore holds that the Minister's decision is subjective and not judicially reviewable, there is uncertainty whether exceptional situations will appear in which the courts may need to practice judicial review, even though the ISA deals with national security matters. Academics have discussed the extent to which judicial review remains available under the ISA, particularly in cases with allegations of mala fides. In Lee Mau Seng, the High Court said that mala fides was not a justiciable issue in relation to the ISA, while in Teo Soh Lung, the Court of Appeal said that it did not need to decide whether Lee Mau Seng had precluded judicial review in mala fides situations until such a case appears. The author Tham Chee Ho opined that the mala fides used by the courts in Lee Mau Seng was unreasonableness, and not mala fides in the view of dishonesty or bad faith. The lawyer Christine Chinkin wrote that the meaning of mala fides in Lee Mau Seng differed from cases such as Cannock Chase District Council v. Kelly (1977), and an allegation of bad faith in the narrow sense could permit review by the courts.

There has also been discussion of whether the 1989 amendments affected the development of the common law, seeing as they did not amount to a codifying or declaratory Act seeking to replace the common law of judicial review, with the author Michael Rutter asserting that the common law will indeed continue to change. While the Parliament has the power to reverse the common law, "the Parliament is powerless to stop the clock from running" and "as soon as the clock is placed back in the hands of the judiciary, the hands might race forward again". Rutter's stance implies that the High Court and Court of Appeal would not be bound by Lee Mau Seng. It could be ruled that situations involving mala fides are judicially reviewable, or completely re-adopt the legal position stated in Chng Suan Tze. Section 8B(2) of the ISA, an ouster clause that restricts judicial review in Singapore law, has also been a subject of discussion. In Teo Soh Lung, the Court of Appeal did not address the constitutionality or full interpretation of the provision, which the lawyer Michael Hor described as "an elegant piece of judicial 'kung fu'". Tham opined that where a jurisdictional error of law is involved, judicial review will be available despite the presence of an ouster clause. However, an ouster clause still precludes judicial review of non-jurisdictional errors of law.

==== Role of the judiciary in national security matters ====
There are competing views over the role of the judiciary in relation to preventive detention under the ISA. The legislative and constitutional amendments relating to judicial review under the ISA were intended to limit the role of the courts in national security matters. In 1989, law minister S. Jayakumar argued that allowing judicial review would shift responsibility for national security matters to the courts. Therefore, the subjective test was considered necessary to allow the government to deal effectively with security threats. Tham contends that, based on the objective test set out in Chng Suan Tze, the fear that the courts will take over responsibility for national security matters is misplaced. This is because the courts did not review the actions taken by the executive for national security purposes, but merely determined whether the situation in fact involves national security issues. Jayakumar also justified the limited role of the judiciary by stating that it would be unsuitable for deciding preventive detention issues, and that the court would be ill-equipped to determine whether there were suspicious circumstances which justify pre-emptive action.

Tham agreed with this view, but argued that it applied only where the courts reviewed the exercise of executive power. He distinguished the objective test applied in Chng Suan Tze from the situation mentioned by Jayakumar, since the court is only interested in whether there is a national security issue involved. The lawyer Thio Li-ann considered the 1989 measures taken to limit judicial checks on executive power to have shown a preference for non-legal institutional checks, as such checks are weak and cannot replace judicial review. She contends that since Article 149 of the Constitution permits the enactment of repressive laws which contravene constitutional liberties, meaningful restraints should be placed on the wide discretionary powers under the ISA.

The author Eunice Chua argued against adopting the subjective test and limiting judicial review to breaches of the procedures stated in the ISA. She suggested that Article 151, should be read liberally in favour of detainees in order to ensures their protection. Conversely, Jayakumar has also argued that judicial review is an inappropriate safeguard in preventing abuse of ISA detention powers, as courts may be unable to assess the security risks under a dishonest government.

== Notable PPSO and ISA cases ==
In 1956, during the Chinese middle school student riots, the Singapore government arrested 234 people suspected of supporting the rioters under the PPSO. Among them included prominent trade union leaders such as Lim Chin Siong, James Puthucheary, Fong Swee Suan, S. Woodhull, and Devan Nair. These arrests were made under the government's plan to remove "subversive elements". Following the People's Action Party's (PAP) landslide victory at the 1959 general election, PAP leader Lee Kuan Yew announced that several PAP detainees would be released. In 1963, Operation Coldstore, a joint Malaysian–Singaporean anti-communist operation, led to the arrest of 133 people. On 30 October 1966, Chia Thye Poh, leader of the leftist political party Barisan Sosialis, was detained. He was subsequently held for 32 years pursuant to the ISA, with all restrictions being lifted on 27 November 1998. As of that date, the South China Morning Post referred to him as "the world's second longest serving prisoner-of-conscience after South Africa's Nelson Mandela".

In 1976, playwright Kuo Pao Kun and his wife Goh Lay Kuan were among 50 people arrested over an alleged communist plot. In 1987, in a security operation known as Operation Spectrum, 22 Roman Catholic church workers, social activists, and professionals were detained under the ISA, following accusations of their involvement in a Marxist conspiracy. The detentions led to, among others, the Chng Suan Tze and Teo Soh Lung cases. In May 1988, former solicitor-general and Law Society president Francis Seow was detained for allegedly receiving political campaign finance from the United States during the 1988 general election as a WP candidate. Two people were arrested in 1997 and four in 1998 for suspected espionage activities. Of those arrested in 1997, one was a male permanent resident who was a deep-cover operative of a foreign intelligence service who had used the other person, a female Singaporean, as a collaborator. Three of the people arrested in 1998 were agents for a foreign intelligence agency. One of them had recruited the fourth person to collect intelligence on and to subvert a local community organization. All the detainees were subsequently released.

From 2001, the ISA was mainly used against al-Qaeda-inspired terrorists in Singapore. In December that year, 15 members of the Jemaah Islamiyah (JI) militant group were arrested for their involvement in the Singapore embassies attack plot. JI member Mohamed Khalim bin Jaffar was detained in January 2002 (and later released in September 2011), and another 21 members were arrested and detained in August 2002. In February 2006, alleged JI head Mas Selamat Kastari was extradited from Indonesia and detained under the ISA. He escaped from custody on 27 February 2008 and was only rearrested by the Malaysian authorities on 1 April 2009. He was transferred back to Singapore for detention under the ISA on 24 September 2010. Between November 2006 and April 2007, four Singaporean JI members were detained under the ISA. In February 2007, lawyer and lecturer Abdul Basheer s/o Abdul Kader was detained for preparing to engage in militant activities in Afghanistan. He was released on 21 February 2010, but rearrested in September 2012 and detained under the ISA the following month for planning to resume jihadist terrorism against foreign military operations abroad. Full-time National Serviceman Muhammad Fadil Abdul Hamid was detained on 4 April 2010. He was described by the media as self-radicalised, having been deeply influenced by the lectures of Feiz Mohammad and Anwar al-Aulaqi which he had accessed online. Around this time, two other people influenced by al-Aulaqi were placed under restriction orders.

Between January and July 2011, three Muslim radicals were deported to Singapore from other countries and detained. JI members Jumari bin Kamdi and Samad bin Subari were arrested in Malaysia and Indonesia respectively; while Abdul Majid s/o Kunji Mohammad, a member of the Moro Islamic Liberation Front (MILF), was arrested in Malaysia. As of 13 September 2011, there were 17 people on orders of detention, one whose detention had been suspended, and 49 people on restriction orders. In March 2013, it was mentioned in Parliament that 64 people had been detained under the ISA for activities related to terrorism since 2002. In September 2013, Asyrani Hussaini had been detained in March that year and was the fifth Singaporean to have been influenced by radical ideology he had read online. He had entered Thailand illegally to take part in the armed insurgency in Southern Thailand, but was arrested and deported to Singapore. Another Singaporean, Mustafa Kamal Mohammad, was placed on a two-year restriction order from September 2013 for being a member of the MILF in the Philippines. Three Singaporean former JI members had their restriction orders lifted; they were Jahpar Osman and Samad Subari, and Abdul Majid Kunji Mohamad who had trained with the MILF.

In January 2021, the Internal Security Department (ISD) confirmed it had detained a 16-year old under the ISA for plotting to attack the Assyafaah and Yusof Ishak Mosques on the anniversary of the Christchurch mosque shootings. In March 2021, the ISD confirmed it had detained 20-year old national serviceman Amirull Ali under the ISA for plotting to attack three Jewish worshippers at the Maghain Aboth Synagogue in solidarity for the Palestinians. In January 2024, the ISD issued a restriction order under the ISA against a 16-year old who had aspired to carry out overseas attacks against African Americans, Arabs, and LGBTQ+ individuals in North America and Europe. The youth had participated in far right online chat groups and been radicalised by far right ideologies. He identified as a White supremacist and subscribed to the Great Replacement theory. In mid-July, the ISD issued restriction orders against a 14-year old and former public servant An'nadya An'nahari, who had both been radicalised in response to the Gaza war. The teenager had wanted to fight for a prophesied Muslim army called the "Black Flag Army" and attempted to recruit classmates for terror attacks in Singapore. An'nahari had expressed support for the Axis of Resistance and advocated violence against Israelis and Jews.

== Provisions relating to security areas ==
Part III of the ISA deals with security areas. Under section 48, the President, acting on Cabinet's advice, may proclaim any area of Singapore a security area if public security is seriously threatened by organised violence, or the threat of such violence, and the declaration is considered necessary to suppress it. A proclamation of a security area must be published by the Home Affairs Minister. It comes into effect once notice has been given, even if it has not yet been published in the Government Gazette. A proclamation remains in force until the President revokes it or Parliament annuls it by passing a resolution.

=== Preservation of public security ===
Chapter II of Part III of the ISA empowers the Minister to take various steps to preserve public security. Within a security area, the Minister may declare areas to be danger areas, controlled areas, or protected places. No person is allowed to enter or remain in such areas unless escorted by a member of a security force, and security forces can take all necessary measures to ensure prohibition. The declaration of an area as a controlled area enables the Minister to order that people within the area only reside within specific portions declared to be "residential part[s]", being unable to venture beyond the residential part during certain hours. Failure to comply with such orders is a criminal offence.

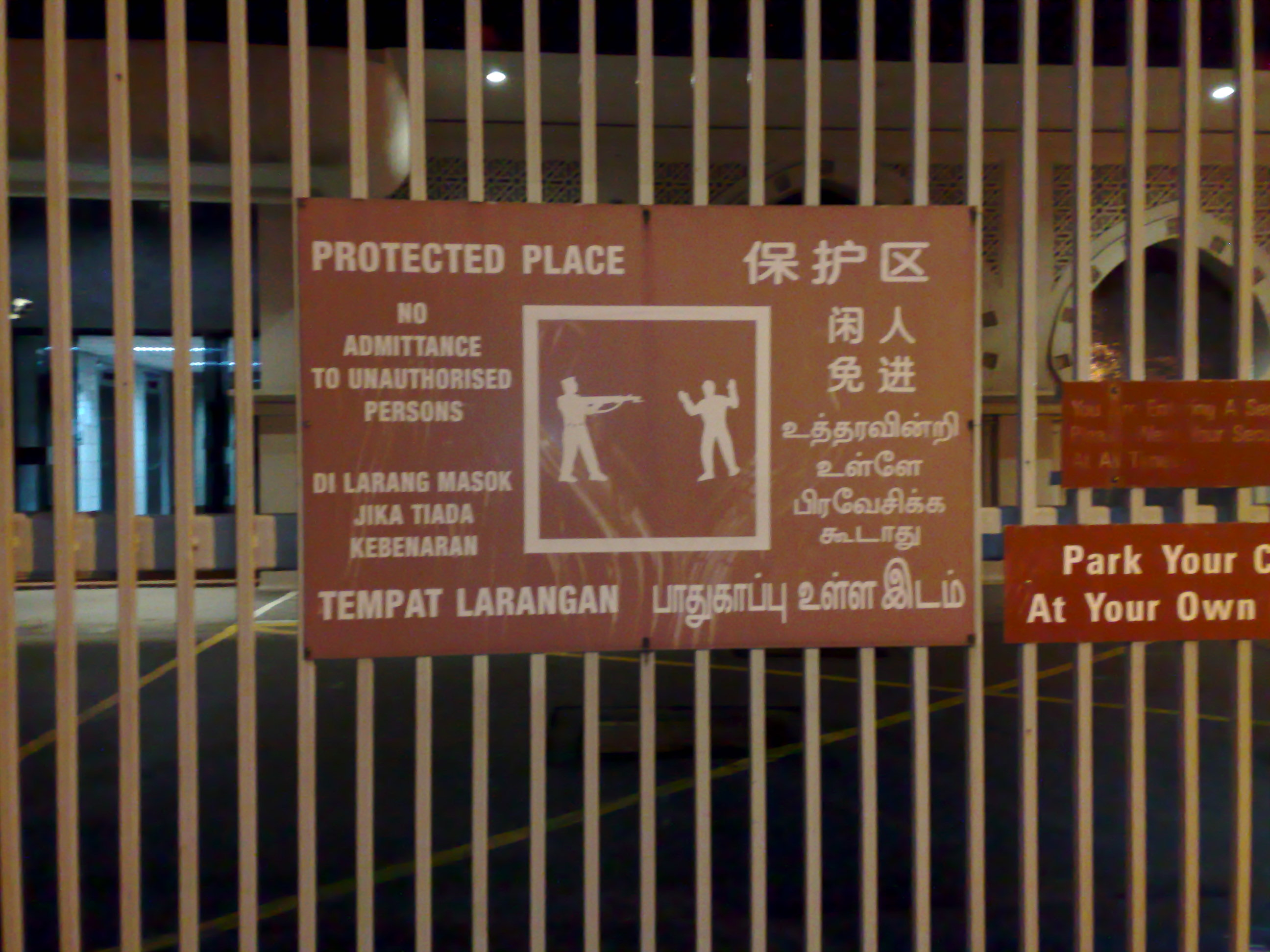
A "protected place" sign on the gate of Telephone House and Central Exchange along Hill Street, and together with "No Unauthorised Photography or Filming" sign. These premises were declared to be a protected place under the Infrastructure Protection Act (Cap. , 2017 Rev. Ed.) rather than the ISA.

If the Commissioner of Police considers it necessary for public security or order, a place within a security area may be declared a protected place; while in force, entry or remaining in the area is prohibited without permission from the authorised person or authority. Persons wishing to enter a protected place must submit to being searched by police officers and other authorised persons, and must comply with directions concerning their conduct, otherwise they will be removed from the protected place. It is an offence to be present in a protected place without permission, and to wilfully fail to stop after being challenged by a police officer or refuse to a search. The Commissioner of Police can take steps considered necessary to secure a protected place, including those that endanger the life of anyone entering the place.

The Minister can declare any fence or barrier surrounding a part of a security area to be a perimeter fence. The Commissioner of Police is permitted to take steps to prevent people from crossing the fence or passing articles over, including defensive measures. If the measures are performed outside the perimeter fence, the Commissioner must take precautions – including displaying prominent warning signs – to ensure that people do not accidentally enter the area. If anyone is injured or dies as a result of a defensive measure, no compensation is payable unless the Minister certifies that it is just and equitable for such compensation to be paid. It is an offence to cross or attempt to cross, or pass or attempt to pass any article over, though or under a perimeter fence except at an authorised entry point; and to damage, attempt to damage, or tamper with any fence or any gate or movable barrier at an entry point.

In the interests of public safety, the Minister can make a clearance order requiring land near railways, roads, perimeter fences, or agricultural areas within a security area to be cleared of vegetation, undergrowth, and other specified items, except permanent buildings. Landowners and occupiers must also maintain the land's cleanliness thereafter. Failure to comply is a criminal offence. If the Minister considers it "necessary or expedient [...] in the interests of public security, or for the accommodation of any security forces", they may take possession of any land or building in a security area. Police officers are permitted to use reasonable force when effecting the taking of possession, and the Minister can require the owner or occupier of the land or building to provide information relating to it. Once land or a building is in the Minister's possession, they have broad power over its use; including disregarding legal restrictions on its use, authorising others to use the property, and restricting rights of access or other rights relating to the land or building. Anyone who feels aggrieved by the Minister taking possession of land or a building can lodge an objection with an advisory committee, which will consider the objections and make recommendations to the Minister. The Minister can give "such directions [on the recommendations] as he may think fit", and award compensation.

If a building in a security area is left unoccupied and the police believe it may be used by persons acting against public security or harbouring such persons, they may authorise its destruction if preventing such use is impracticable. Compensation is payable if the owner can demonstrate that the building was lawfully constructed and was used for such purposes without their knowledge or consent despite enacting due diligence.

=== Offences ===
==== Firearms, ammunition, and explosives ====
It is an offence to carry, or have in one's possession or under one's control in a security area without lawful excuse, any firearm, ammunition, or explosive without lawful authority. The penalty for such offence is death. The onus is on the person charged to prove that they have a lawful excuse for having the item, and this can only be done by demonstrating that they acquired the item in a lawful manner for a lawful purpose, and did not act "in a manner prejudicial to public security or the maintenance of public order" while in possession of or having control of it. Furthermore, the person charged has lawful authority to have the item only if they are a member of the police force, security forces, or Prisons Department; are licensed or authorised to have the item; or have been granted an exemption by an officer or Commissioner of Police-designated individual. However, a person can still be regarded as not having lawful authority – even if they are allowed the weapon – if they are using it against public interests or security.

It is a crime, while in a security area, to consort with or to be found in the company of a person carrying or having possession of or having under their control a firearm, ammunition or explosive in contravention of the offence mentioned above, if the circumstances raise a reasonable presumption that the person consorting intends or is about to act or has recently acted with the person having the item in a manner prejudicial to public security or the maintenance of public order. The penalty is either death or life imprisonment. It is a slightly less serious offence to be in a security area and consort with or be in the company of another person if it is reasonable for the person consorting to know that the other person had one of the above items. The penalty for this offence is imprisonment not exceeding ten years. If a person is carrying or has in their possession or under their control a firearm, ammunition or explosive, there is a rebuttable presumption that the person was acting in contravention of the offence mentioned above.

==== Supplies ====
It is an offence for a person, whether inside or outside a security area, to demand, collect or receive supplies from another person under circumstances which raise a reasonable presumption that: the first person intends or is about to act, or has recently acted, in a manner prejudicial to public security or the maintenance of public order; or the supplies are intended for someone who intends or is about to act, or has recently acted in such a manner, or are for a terrorist to use. It is also an offence, inside or outside a security area, to be found in possession of supplies which cannot be satisfactorily accounted for, or to directly or indirectly provide supplies to another person, in circumstances which raise the reasonable presumption referred to above. The penalty for all these offences is life imprisonment. However, in the latter situation, a person will not be convicted if they voluntarily provide full information of the offence to a police officer before being accused of or charged with the offence.

==== Other offences ====
A person inside or outside a security area who knows or has reasonable cause to believe that another person has committed an offence under Part III of the ISA, or has information about the present or intended movements or whereabouts of another person whom they know or have reasonable cause to believe to be a terrorist, but who fails to report the matter to a police officer, commits an offence punishable by imprisonment for up to ten years. However, if the person voluntarily gives full information to a police officer before being accused of or charged with an offence, they will not be convicted. It is also an offence to attempt to commit an offence under Part III; to assist someone that one knows or has reasonable cause to believe has committed an offence to prevent, hinder or interfere with that person's arrest, trial or punishment; or generally to contravene or fail to comply with any provision of Part III or any order made, direction given or requirement imposed under Part III, or to abet any contravention or failure by another person.

== Miscellaneous provisions ==
A police officer is entitled to use such force as is reasonably necessary in the circumstances, including lethal weapons:

- to arrest a person subject to a detention order;
- to arrest a person in respect of whom the officer has reason to believe that there are grounds justifying their preventive detention, or that they have acted or are about to act or are likely to act in a manner prejudicial to national security;
- to arrest a person suspected of having committed an offence under the ISA, the Corrosive and Explosive Substances and Offensive Weapons Act, or sections 435 or 436 of the Penal Code which criminalize the commission of mischief by fire or an explosive substance to damage property or destroy a building;
- to overcome forcible resistance by a person to such an arrest; or
- to prevent an arrested person from escaping or being rescued from arrest.

A person who has been arrested for any of the offences mentioned above must, as soon as possible after arrest, be "clearly warned of his liability to be shot at if he endeavours to escape from custody". In addition to a police officer, the power to use force can be exercised by a member of the security forces, any guard or watchman in a protected place, and any person authorised by the Commissioner of Police.

Provisions exist in the ISA to make it easier to admit statements made by people charged with offences under the Act or certain offences under other laws specified in the Second Schedule to the Act. A statement is admissible in evidence in a trial and, if the person who made the statement chooses to testify during a trial, it may be used in cross-examination and to impeach their credit, "whether the statement amounts to a confession or not or is oral or in writing, made at any time, whether before or after that person is charged and whether in the course of a police investigation or not and whether or not wholly or partly in answer to questions, by that person to or in the hearing of any police officer of or above the rank of sergeant and whether or not interpreted to him by any other police officer or any other person concerned, or not, in the arrest". This is subject to two limitations:

- A statement is not admissible "if the making of the statement appears to the court to have been caused by any inducement, threat or promise having reference to the charge against that person, proceeding from a person in authority and sufficient in the opinion of the court to give that person grounds which would appear to him reasonable for supposing that by making it he would gain any advantage or avoid any evil of a temporal nature in reference to the proceedings against him".
- If a statement has been made by a person after being arrested, it is only admissible if the court is satisfied that a caution along the following lines was administered: "It is my duty to warn you that you are not obliged to say anything or to answer any question, but anything you say, whether in answer to a question or not, may be given in evidence." However, if a person makes a statement before there is time to administer a caution, the statement remains admissible if the caution is then administered as soon as possible.

Once a person has been cautioned, they have a right to remain silent and are not required to answer any questions.

== See also ==
- Internal Security Act 1960
- Criminal Law (Temporary Provisions) Act (Singapore)
- Judicial independence in Singapore
- Hong Kong national security law
