= Article 11 of the Constitution of Singapore =

Article 11 of the Constitution of the Republic of Singapore forbids ex post facto laws, cruel and unusual punishment, and double jeopardy.

== Text of Article 11 ==
Article 11 of the Constitution of the Republic of Singapore states:

11.—(1) No person shall be punished for an act or omission which was not punishable by law when it was done or made, and no person shall suffer greater punishment for an offence than was prescribed by law at the time it was committed. (2) A person who has been convicted or acquitted of an offence shall not be tried again for the same offence except where the conviction or acquittal has been quashed and a retrial ordered by a court superior to that by which he was convicted or acquitted.

== Where Double Jeopardy does not Apply ==
Double jeopardy does not apply in cases where a person is acquitted of criminal charges in a court of law, but faces disciplinary action from professional associations on the same set of facts.
