= List of Singaporean dissidents =

This is a list of Singaporean political dissidents since 1959.

== Detained by Operation Coldstore (1963) and Spectrum (1987) ==
- Chia Thye Poh, Operation Coldstore detainee
- Lim Chin Siong, Operation Coldstore detainee
- Said Zahari, Operation Coldstore detainee
- Fong Swee Suan, Operation Coldstore detainee
- James Puthucheary, Operation Coldstore detainee
- Lim Hock Siew, Operation Coldstore detainee
- Linda Chen, Operation Coldstore detainee
- Poh Soo Kai, Operation Coldstore detainee
- Sandrasegaran Woodhull, Operation Coldstore detainee
- Tan Wah Piow, alleged Operation Spectrum mastermind
- Tang Fong Har, Operation Spectrum detainee
- Vincent Cheng Kim Chuan, Operation Spectrum detainee

== Other dissidents ==
- J. B. Jeyaretnam
- Devan Nair
- Lee Siew Choh
- Tang Liang Hong
- Francis Seow
- Chee Soon Juan
- Martyn See
- M Ravi
- Kirsten Han
- Thum Ping Tjin
- Alex Tan
- Roy Ngerng
- Jolovan Wham
- Han Hui Hui
- Charles Yeo
- Amos Yee

== See also ==
- Internal Security Act
- List of Singaporeans
- Human rights in Singapore
