= Martyn See =

- Occupation: Filmmaker

Martyn See is a Singaporean filmmaker and the former Executive Secretary of the now defunct Singaporeans for Democracy, a human rights non-governmental organization.

== Life and career ==
See has been a feature editor for local Singaporean films, some of which include Mee Pok Man (1995, Eric Khoo), That One No Enough (1999, Jack Neo), I Do I Do (2005, Wen Hui, Jack Neo), Singapore GaGa (2005, Tan Pin Pin), Just Follow Law (2007, Jack Neo), and Money No Enough 2 (2008, Jack Neo).

In 2004, See made the 26-minute documentary film Singapore Rebel, about Chee Soon Juan, the leader of opposition party Singapore Democratic Party (SDP). In March 2005, government movie censors ordered the withdrawal of his film from the Singapore International Film Festival. See was put under police investigation by the Singapore government, and threatened with prosecution under the Films Act, requiring him to surrender his video camera, taped footage of the documentary, and materials related to the production. See could face up to two years in jail or a fine of up to S$100,000.

In 2006, See made a new 49 minute documentary entitled Zahari's 17 Years, on Singapore's late ex-political prisoner Said Zahari, who spent a total of 17 years in detention without trial as a result of Operation Coldstore, a covert security operation in Singapore. The film has been banned by the Singapore Government.

On 14 July 2010, the Ministry of Information, Communications and the Arts banned his latest film, Dr Lim Hock Siew, about Lim Hock Siew's similar plight.

== See also ==
- Operation Coldstore
- Lim Hock Siew
