= University Socialist Club =

Left-Wing Student Group (1953-1971)

The University Socialist Club (abbrev: USC) was a left-wing student group active from 1953 to 1971 that played an important role in the politics of colonial Malaya and post-colonial Malaysia and Singapore. Members of the club played a significant role in bringing independence from the British Empire and in debates over the shape of the post-colonial nation. The club was instrumental in the formation and early success of the People's Action Party (PAP) and later, Barisan Sosialis (BS). Prominent members of the Club included Wang Gungwu, S.R. Nathan, Poh Soo Kai, Sydney Woodhull, Lim Hock Siew, and Tommy Koh and M. K. Rajakumar.

== Background ==
As the end of World War II fostered national independence movements across the world, increasingly nationalistic sentiments in British colonies threatened the British pre-war empire. Decolonization was expected by both the local nationalists and the British rulers. At the same time, the burgeoning Cold War was also driving cultural and ideological change. When the club was formed, Singapore was still under the control of the Emergency Regulation, which was imposed by the colonial regime throughout the peninsular Malaya and Singapore against the communist insurgency. Underground activities of the Malayan Communist Party (MCP) was seen as a threat by the British. In one typical example of anti-British activity and response, 35 students of the University of Malaya were arrested in January 1951 for participating in the anti-colonial movement as the members of the Anti-British League (ABL). The socialist club was formed in 1953 under the influence of nationalism, decolonization and modernism.

== History ==
The beginnings of the club can be traced back to the political discussions held by the medical students of the University of Malaya. The discussion then expanded to include students from arts and science faculty at the Bukit Timah campus (13). In October 1952, the medical and arts students held a debate in the lounge of the Road Hostel, proposing the concept of a general political debating club.

On 21 February 1953, the inaugural meeting of the club was held. During the meeting, the proposal to call the club as a socialist club was adopted. The members of the Central Working Committee (CWC) were elected; Wang Gungwu was elected as the first president of the club with Oorjitham as secretary general and Woodhull as publication secretary. The constitution of the University Socialist Club was drafted as follow:

1. To stimulate student political discussion and activists.
2. To propagate socialist thought.
3. To support the University of Malaya Students' Union in demands of students' rights.
4. To study the means of unity in Malaya.

Also reflected in the constitution of Club above, the club was made in a flexible and open manner so the membership can be given to any individuals who have alternative political views as long as those opinions are in favor of anti-colonialism.

In February 1954, the magazine issues by the club which was mainly circulated within the campus known as the organ of the Socialist Club adopted the name of Fajar (Fajar means "dawn" in Arabic). In March, the first issue of Fajar was produced.

=== The Fajar Trial ===
In May 1954, nine members of the Fajar editorial board were arrested for publishing an allegedly seditious article named "Aggression in Asia". Jeyaraj C. Rajarao resigned from the board after his arrest and interrogation and was not put on trial. The other eight members of the Fajar editorial board at the trial were James Puthucheary, M.K. Rajakumar, Lam Khuan Kit, Kwa Boo Sun, Arudsothy, Edwin Thumboo and Thomas Varkey. English Queen's Counsel Denis Pritt acted as the lead counsel with Lee Kuan Yew and Tann Wee Tiong assisting him as junior counsel. After three days of the trial, Fajar members were released.

Pritt played a significant role in the trial. However, it was unknown who invited Pritt to defend the students. According to the book Men in White, written by journalists Sonny Yap, Leong Weng Kam, and Richard Lim, it was Lee who arranged the service of Pritt(35). While accordingly to Poh's memories, it was John Eber, a former leader of the Malayan Democratic Union, who offered the arrangement of the free legal services of Pritt to defend the students. While it remained unclear on who invited Pritt, Lee enjoyed a widespread reputation after achieving "the tremendous victory for freedom of speech" which was proclaimed in The Straits Times on 26 August.

=== The Impact of Fajar Trial ===
Fajar trial was the first sedition trial in the post-war Malaysia and Singapore; the club's final victory stands out as one of the notable landmarks in the progress of decolonization of this part of the world.

Firstly, the Fajar trial witnessed the historical period when Nationalist trends of thoughts exerted great influence on people of different backgrounds in Malaya. Left-leaning individuals and organizations including the Chinese school students and workers contributed generously to the defense fund of the club. Numerous academics and scholars stood out to openly support the club.

Secondly, for the Club itself, this unexpected victory undoubtedly was an effective and stimulant result for the members to propagate the ideas of socialism in Singapore, and even through the work of the Pan Malayan Students Federation to stir waves in Malaya. After the trial, the passionate Club started to target the non-university students as well to expand the influence of its talks and forums. On the other hand, the trial also affected the organization structure of the club. In the initial year of the club's founding, it had a mix of left-wing socialists and those of a more centrist leaning. The Fajar trial led to the departure of the latter from the club.

==== Involvement with PAP ====
Additionally, the Fajar trial not only paved the way for Lee's political career but also laid the foundation for the future collaboration relationship between the Club and the PAP that Lee launched soon. After the trial, Lee was praised by all the Singaporeans as a diligent, trustworthy socialist lawyer who devoted himself into the national liberation endeavour against colonialism. With this cooperation, Lee gained the trust of several Club members involved in the trial; those people subsequently helped Lee to start the PAP in November 1954. The USC were involved in discussions on the aims and directions of the party and on its draft constitution. More importantly, the club, while having impact through the different social classes support the founding of the PAP. Even in PAP's very first election with only four candidates, the club members made painstaking effort to canvass for its candidates.

=== Involvement with BS ===
In 1961, disagreements on the proposed merger plan to form Malaysia and long-standing internal party power struggle led to the split of the left-wing group from the PAP. The university socialists left the PAP and form BS. Numerous club members and alumni supported the BS's critique of Malaysia as a neocolonial plot and the party. Sydney Woodhull, Poh Soo Kai, Lim Hock Siew and Puthucheary served in the twelve-member executive committee (Woodhull was vice-chairman, Lim Shee Pingon the committee, Lim Hock Siew was editor of the party magazine Plebeian). Others such as Philomen Oorijtham, Tan Jing Quee, Albert Lim Shee Ping and Sheng Nam Chim were ordinary members.

=== Operation Coldstore ===
On 2 February 1963 (156), Operation Coldstore was carried out and numerous Club alumni were arrested and sentenced to the prison: Lim Hock Siew for 16 years; Poh for 15 years until 1973 and again three years later. Others included Woodhull, Jamit Singh, A. Mahadeva, Albert Lim Shee Ping, Ho Piao and Puthucheary. Subsequently, Fajar and five Nanyang University publication were banned in Singapore in February.

The USC was viewed as a pro-communist organization in the documentation of Operation Coldstore. However many scholars or writers defended USC in various ways.

In 2010, Poh argued the club was labelled based on the shallow and oversimplified logic of "we were genuine and sincere so were communists then we were labelled as communists". He also defended this by giving numerous reasons including Lee's friendship with Woodhull, the isolation of the club from political parties, their broad concept of socialism and the diverse ideologies under one consensus that is against western aggregation and imperialism and for civil rights and democracy.

According to Loh Kah Seng, a Singaporean historian, he argued that, except for the initial year of the club and the period of Tommy Koh's stewardship, the Club adopted a Marxian form of socialism; however, it was not a front for the Malaya Communist Party.

According to Lee Ting Hui in his book The Open United Front, he contended that USC can not be counted as a mass organization of the CPM despite the fact that some of the CPM people joined it (73). He also refers to Lim Shee Ping's insight of USC to point out the mutual exclusion of CPM and USC. The latter says "the socialist club were considered by them (ABL and the party) as immature and unreliable by the standards of them".

=== Post Operation Coldstore ===
The club was deregistered in 1971.

== The Student Move for University Autonomy in the mid-1960s. ==
According to Loh, in the progress of shaping the new nation, multitudinous student organizations made the contribution to this historical period despite their diverse beliefs and political views. In the mid-1960s, the student politics represented the large-scale convergence of the student organizations regardless their educational background. Both English-educated groups and the Chinese-educated ones appeared to be issue-oriented and managed to seek common ground while reserving differences, respecting each other and pursuing collectively for the university autonomy.

In the student activities in the 1960s, the Club still maintain an influential power on the campus and raised the banner to ally itself with alternative student groups to defend the student right and freedom of speech from the intervene of the government who was its reliable ally in the 1950s. The period from 1966 when the student move broken out to 1971 witnessed the club's final struggle under growing social control of the PAP-ruled government.

The club played an active role in the work of the Joint Activities Committee which was formed in October 1960 by the Socialist Club, the Singapore Polytechnic Political Society and the Nanyang University Political Science Society to fight against the PAP government's intervention of university autonomy and student right the alliance.

After PAP came to power and gained the absolute control over the new-born nation, the relationship between it and the club has experienced an essential change. In 1966, the Ministry of Culture ordered the Socialist Club to obtain a permit for the publication of Siaran or cease publication; the club is told to register with the Registrar of Societies under the Societies Act.

In 1975 the government reconstructed the University of Singapore Student Union; students lost the right to elect the leaders by themselves, and the funds of the Union was put under the control of the university administration. Those regulations were a forceful confinement of the student activities. C. M. Turnbull argued it was a landmark event recording the end of student activism.

== Impact ==
The role of the club to connect different groups of diverse backgrounds was highly visible in numerous activities in which it participated. Without a direct impact on the political area, the club took advantages of its forums, magazine and seminars to speak out the voice of people of all social stratum. For most of the 1950s, the club went outside the campus to mobilize people from various socioeconomic groups, such as the working class and peasantry, facilitating the national coalition as the social bridge.

At the same time, the socialist ideology of the club was reflected by various decisions made by the club in its progress of pursuing a nation-state. Although the club members saw themselves as a group of English-educated intellectuals; in the 1960s, they described Fajar as "the only journal of the English-educated leftwing." Loh questions the oversimplified classification of the club as an English-educated groups by emphasizing the fact that club enthusiastically supported the idea of promoting Malay as a national language instead of English.

At the time, both the Alliance government and the PAP government was trying to promote the use of Malay as the national language. In 1959 the club held a two-day seminar named the national language seminar to discuss the pros and cons of the use of Malay. Loh calls this "a modernist approach to engineering a new nation-state's unifying language". The seminar was the effort of the club to connect the English and non-English-educated community in Singapore. The language used during the seminar and the target of it were English and English-educated intellectuals respectively (99). They also appealed to the English-speaking groups to sacrifice their vested interest for a national identity.

The club, based on its socialist thinking, made a significant contribution to the progress of decolonization by achieving the coalition of the diverse group against colonialism in its way. The book of Fajar generation memorises the club by arguing "the Club was founded at a time of much promise for an opening in public discourse but ended when the basis of such public discourse was denied. It marked a closing of the mind from which a new opening must surely come at some future".
