= Dissident =

Person who actively challenges an established political or religious system

A dissident is a person who actively challenges an established political or religious system, doctrine, belief, policy, or institution. In a religious context, the word has been used since the 18th century, and in the political sense since the 20th century, coinciding with the rise of authoritarian governments in countries such as Fascist Italy, Nazi Germany, Imperial Japan, Francoist Spain, the Soviet Union (and later Russia), North Korea, China, Turkmenistan and the Middle East.

In the Western world, there are historical examples of people who have been considered and have considered themselves dissidents, such as the Dutch philosopher Baruch Spinoza. Dissidents in democratic or semi-democratic states often faced defamation lawsuits, anti-terrorism laws and "disguised repression" (using non-political charges) to silence, induce self-censorship or undermine public support for dissidents. In totalitarian countries, dissidents are often incarcerated or executed without explicit political accusations, or due to infringements of the very same laws they are opposing, or because they are supporting civil liberties such as freedom of speech.

== Modes of operation ==
Dissidents operate by actively challenging established political or religious systems through strategies designed to evade state surveillance, build popular support and impose governance costs on the authorities and the ruling elites. Their methods range from nonviolent civil disobedience to clandestine, underground operations, often relying on digital technologies for secure communication and dissemination of information.

Dissidents and activists were among the earliest adopters of encrypted communications technology such as Tor and the dark web, turning to the technology as ways to resist totalitarian regimes, avoid censorship and control and protect privacy.

Tor was widely used by protestors against the Mubarak regime in Egypt in 2011. Tor allowed Egyptian dissidents to communicate anonymously and securely, while sharing sensitive information. Also, Syrian rebels widely used Tor in order to share with the world all of the horrors that they witnessed in their country. Moreover, anti-government dissidents in Lebanon, Mauritania, as well as other nations affected by the Arab Spring, widely used Tor in order to stay safe while exchanging their ideas and agendas.

== States ==
=== Eastern Bloc ===
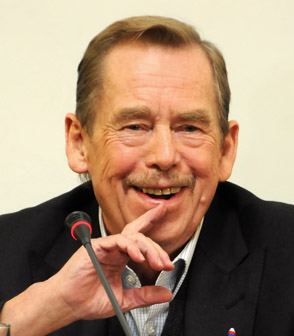
Václav Havel, playwright and former dissident. Leader of the Velvet Revolution, last president of Czechoslovakia and the first president of the Czech Republic.

The term dissident was used in the Eastern Bloc, particularly in the Soviet Union, in the period following Joseph Stalin's death until the fall of communism. It was attached to citizens who criticized the practices or the authority of the communist party. Writers for the non-censored, non-conformist samizdat literature were criticized in the official newspapers. Soon, many of those who were dissatisfied with Eastern Bloc regimes began to self-identify as dissidents. This radically changed the meaning of the term: instead of being used in reference to an individual who opposes society, it came to refer to an individual whose non-conformism was perceived to be for the good of the society. In Hungary, the word disszidens was used in contemporary language for a person who had left for the West without permission (i.e. a defector), by illegally crossing the border or travelling abroad with a passport, but not returning and (sometimes) applying for asylum abroad. Such persons' citizenship was usually revoked, and their left behind property (if there was any to their name) would revert to the state.

==== Soviet ====
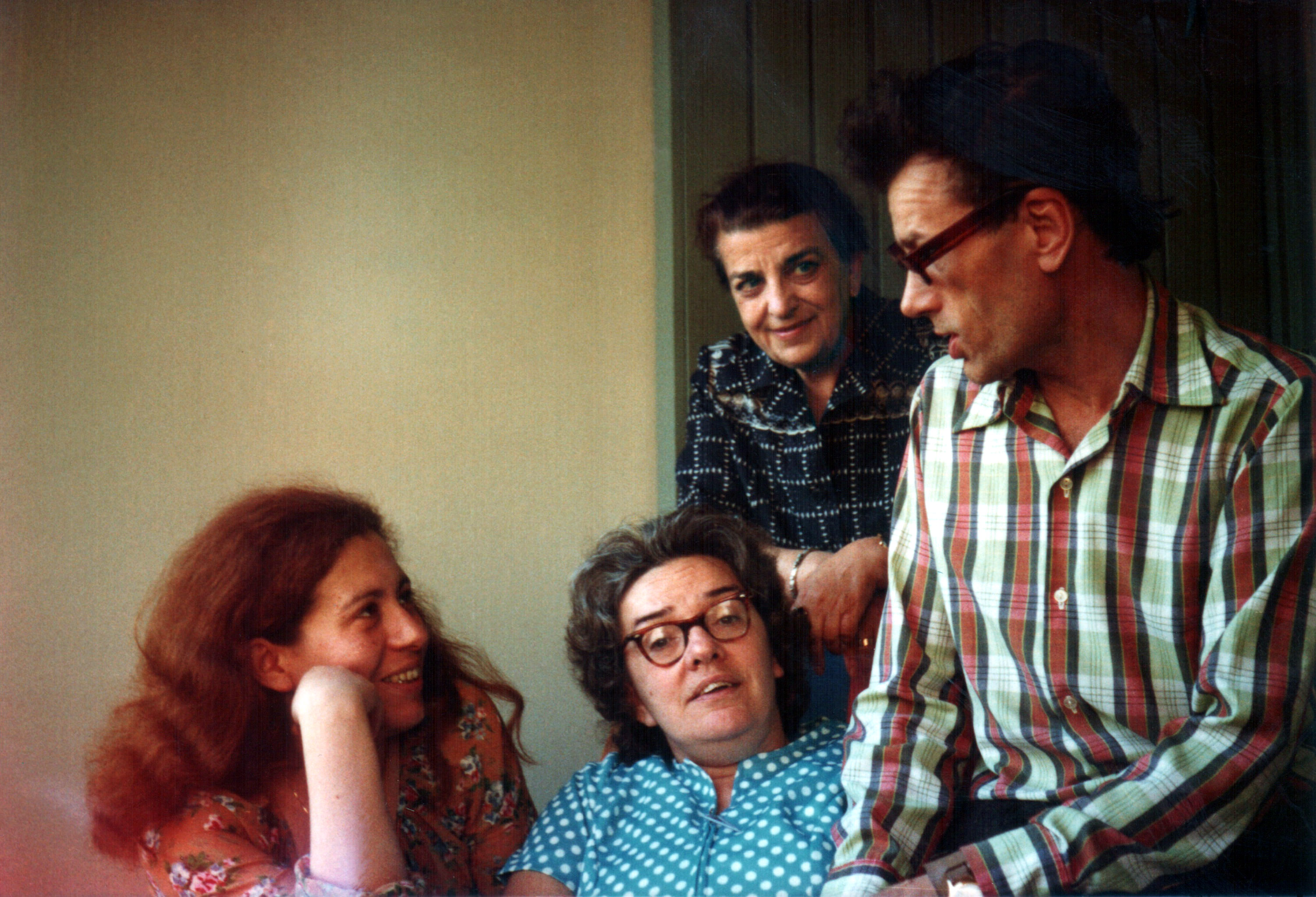
Moscow Helsinki Group members Yuliya Vishnevskaya, Lyudmila Alexeyeva, Dina Kaminskaya, Kronid Lyubarsky in Munich, 1978

Soviet dissidents were people who disagreed with certain features in the embodiment of Soviet ideology and who were willing to speak out against them. The term dissident was used in the Soviet Union in the period following Joseph Stalin's death until the fall of communism. It was used to refer to small groups of marginalized intellectuals whose modest challenges to the Soviet regime met protection and encouragement from correspondents. Following the etymology of the term, a dissident is considered to "sit apart" from the regime. As dissenters began self-identifying as dissidents, the term came to refer to an individual whose non-conformism was perceived to be for the good of a society.

Political opposition in the USSR was barely visible and, with rare exceptions, of little consequence. Instead, an important element of dissident activity in the Soviet Union was informing society (both inside the Soviet Union and in foreign countries) about violation of laws and of human rights. Over time, the dissident movement created vivid awareness of Soviet Communist abuses.

Soviet dissidents who criticized the state faced possible legal sanctions under the Soviet Criminal Code and faced the choice of exile, the mental hospital, or penal servitude. Anti-Soviet political behavior, in particular, being outspoken in opposition to the authorities, demonstrating for reform, or even writing books – was defined as being simultaneously a criminal act (e.g., violation of Articles 70 or 190–1), a symptom (e.g., "delusion of reformism"), and a diagnosis (e.g., "sluggish schizophrenia").

==== Czechoslovak ====
Czechoslovak dissidents became significant after the 1948 Communist coup and especially after the Warsaw Pact invasion, which ended the liberalizing moment of the Prague Spring and led to much of the elite being removed from political and intellectual positions. In the ensuing era of normalization, the unlikely dissident union of former Communists, counter-cultural youth and Christians formed a so-called underground or 'parallel' culture. This underground created Charter 77 and related movements, eventually meeting success in the Velvet Revolution, in which the formerly imprisoned writer and Charter 77 spokesperson Václav Havel became a key political leader.

=== Myanmar ===
Aung San Suu Kyi is a famous Myanmar dissident who also won the Nobel Peace Prize.

=== Western Europe ===
==== Ireland ====
The term dissident has become the primary term to describe Irish republicans who politically continue to oppose Good Friday Agreement of 1998 and reject the outcome of the referendums on it. These political parties also have paramilitary wings which espouse violent methods to achieve a United Ireland.

Irish republican dissident groups include the Irish Republican Socialist Party (founded in 1974 – its currently-inactive paramilitary wing is the Irish National Liberation Army), Republican Sinn Féin (founded in 1986 – its paramilitary wing is the Continuity IRA), and the 32 County Sovereignty Movement (founded in 1997 – its paramilitary wing is the Real IRA). In 2006 the Óglaigh na hÉireann emerged, which is a splinter group of the Continuity IRA.

==== United Kingdom ====
Mark Smith was a mid-level British diplomat, who resigned as a counter-terrorism official at the British embassy in Dublin. He was protesting against the sale of British weapons to Israel and said that "the state of Israel is perpetrating war crimes in plain sight".

=== United States ===
Stacy Gilbert, who served in the State Department's Bureau of Population, Refugees and Migration resigned in protest because of a report that she contributed to was falsified by the Biden administration. She said that the report falsely stated that Israel was not blocking humanitarian aid to Gaza.

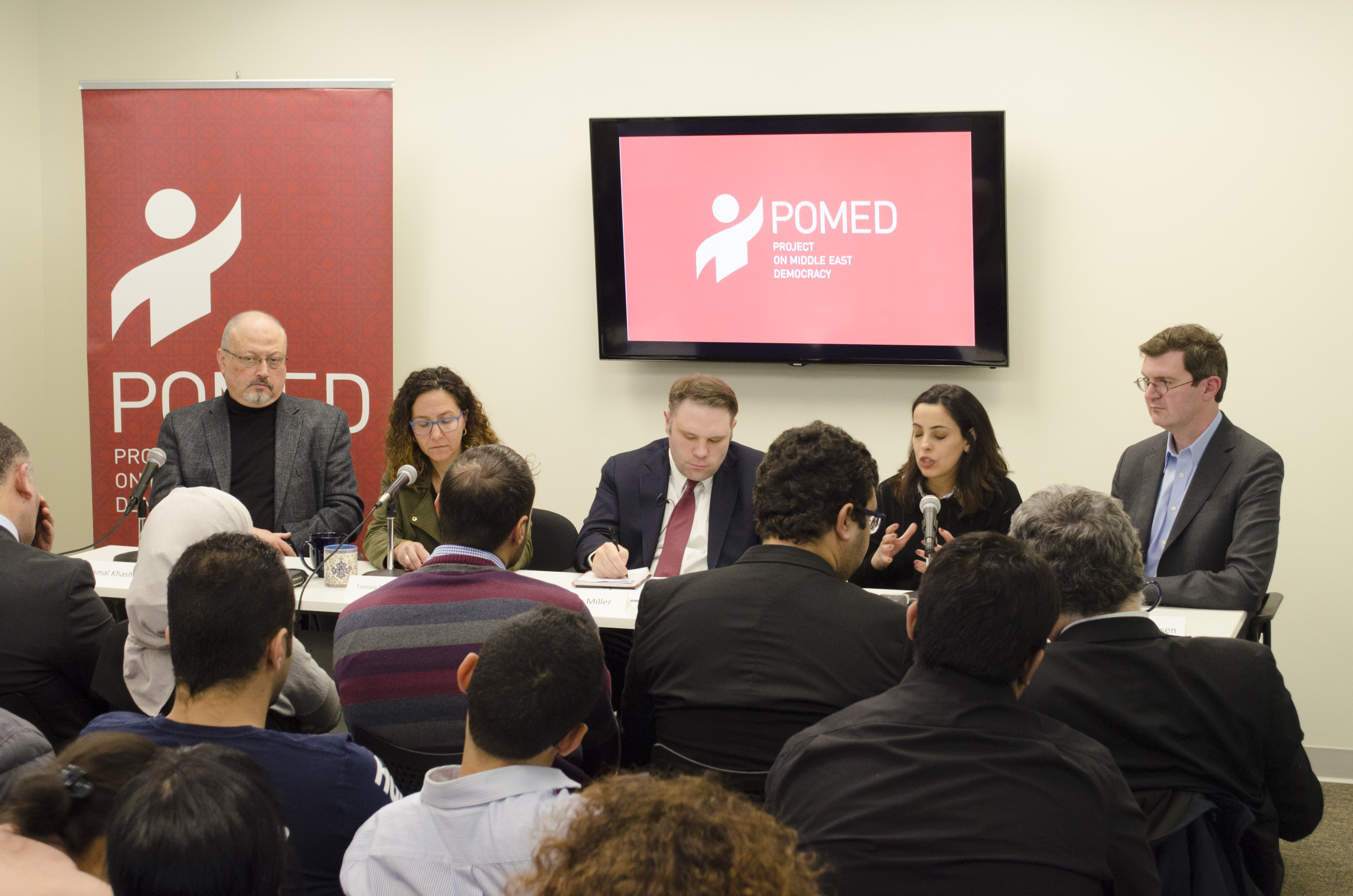
Saudi Arabian dissident journalist Jamal Khashoggi (left) at a 2018 Project on Middle East Democracy forum in Washington, D.C.

=== Saudi Arabia ===
Jamal Khashoggi was a Saudi American dissident and journalist. He was murdered inside the Saudi Arabian consulate in Istanbul by agents of the Saudi government, allegedly at the behest of Crown Prince Mohammed bin Salman.

Various other human rights activists from Saudi Arabia have been either silenced or punished. This also happens if the individual lives outside the country. If a dissident is not a Saudi citizen, they will probably face deportation.

The Fact Finding Panel (FFP), an independent jury of British parliamentary members and international attorneys, was tasked with reviewing the detention of former Crown Prince of Saudi Arabia Mohammed bin Nayef and Prince Ahmed bin Abdulaziz. In mid-December 2020, the panel published a report stating its findings, which claimed that the collective detention of political prisoners by the Kingdom of Saudi Arabia is a violation of the country's international legal obligations, as the authorities are holding the detainees without charge and not allowing them a chance to challenge their imprisonment. The imprisonment has also risked the safety of the detainees by posing fatal risks to their health by keeping them behind bars without providing proper medical aid amid the ongoing COVID-19 pandemic.

=== Bahrain ===
Another monarchy of the Middle East, Bahrain, is known for violating the rights of peaceful critics of the government, including political activists and human rights defenders. A report released by Amnesty International in 2017 revealed that the country opted for several repressive tactics, including arbitrary detention, torture and harassment between June 2016 and June 2017 to crush the dissidents. Several human rights organizations and international leaders have consistently denounced Bahrain's poor human rights records.

The Human Rights Watch World Report 2021 also highlighted that Bahrain continued its repressive actions against the dissidents, including acts against online activities, peaceful critics and opposition activists. In January 2021, forty cross-party MPs of the UK wrote a letter to the vice-chancellor of an educational institution, the University of Huddersfield, stating that it was at risk of “indirect implication in human rights abuse”. The university was running a master's course, MSc in security science, for the officers of Bahrain's Royal Academy of Policing, the building which was also being used for torturing dissidents.

In April 2021, the European Parliament adopted a resolution on Bahrain, especially concerning the cases of detained dissidents Nabeel Rajab, Abdulhadi al-Khawaja and Ibrahim Sharif. With 48 votes in favor, the MEPs condemned Bahrain for its human rights violations and called for an immediate release of all the political activists, prisoners in conscience, human rights defenders, journalists and peaceful protesters. The European Parliament also demanded that the Bahraini government take all necessary measures to respect the law and make sure that its actions remain in full compliance with the international standards of human rights.

In March 2023, Bahrain hosted a meeting of the Inter-Parliamentary Union. However, on 8 March 2023, officials cancelled the entry visas issued to the HRW officials on 30 January 2023 to attend the 146th Congress of the IPU. Bahraini authorities have imposed restrictions on expression, association and assembly in violation of the country's international human rights obligations.

On 31 March 2023, three men, Jalal Al-Kassab, Redha Rajab and Mohammed Rajab, were sentenced to prison for a year and faced a fine in Bahrain. They were prosecuted under a law criminalizing the "ridicule" of all books recognized as religious in Bahrain, including the Quran and the Bible. The men were members of a Bahraini religious and cultural society that promotes open discussion of Islamic issues. Human rights groups claimed that they were indicted for exercising their freedom of expression.

=== Iran ===
Iranian dissidents are composed of scattered groups that reject the current government or the previous regime back in 1979, that seek the establishment of democratic institutions in Iran. A partnership council called Mahsa had formed between Reza Pahlavi and other opposition groups in support of the future of Iran’s democracy movement in 2022. The government in 2023 charged 107 exiled Mujahideen with treason. Dissidents have formed Iran Human Rights. Despite the Mykonos restaurant assassinations, the Government of the Federal Republic of Germany actively silences exiled Iranian dissidents. Even so, in 2023, the Woman Life Freedom Movement won the Sakharov Prize and imprisoned anti-regime journalist Narges Mohammadi was awarded the Nobel Peace Prize. The Ministry of Foreign Affairs of Iran condemned the decision.

=== United Arab Emirates ===
The UAE has been accused of imprisoning critics. Like many other Middle Eastern countries, it does not allow criticism of the government. Many Emirati dissidents have been languishing in jail, some of them for a decade.

On 10 July 2024, 53 human right defendants and political dissidents were convicted by the Abu Dhabi Federal Court for establishing an independent advocacy group “Justice and Dignity Committee” in 2010, which the UAE considers as a terrorist organisation. The court sentenced 43 defendants were sentenced to life in prison, five to 15 years and another five to 10 years in prison, following an unfair mass trial. On 4 March 2025, all appeals by the convicted people got rejected by the UAE, implying that no future appeals for the case will be accepted in the UAE court. Joey Shea, UAE researcher at Human Right Watch said the UAE’s decision exposes the shortcomings of its justice system in handling political dissent.

On 8 January 2025, the Emirati authorities announced to include 11 political dissidents and their families, along with 8 companies to its terrorism list, alleging them of having connections with Muslim Brotherhood. Registered in the UK, all 8 companies were currently previously owned by exiled Emirati dissidents or their relatives. Only 2 of the 11 individuals were convicted or accused of terrorist offense, but under questionable circumstances as per the Emirates Detainees Advocacy Centre (EDAC). Human Rights Watch called for immediate removal of the terrorism designation, saying that listing 19 individuals and companies as “terrorists” without any due process is a mockery of rule of law. It also stated that the U.K. government should intervene to defend British businesses against the allegations of UAE authorities.

=== Egypt ===
A March 2023 report by Human Rights Watch stated that Egyptian authorities systematically refused to issue or renew ID cards for dozens of foreign dissidents, journalists and human rights activists over the past few years. The denial was possibly intended to pressure them to return to near-certain persecution in Egypt. By arbitrarily denying citizens valid passports and other overseas identification documents, Egyptian authorities violated both the constitution and international human rights law.

== See also ==
- List of Chinese dissidents
- List of Singaporean dissidents
- Cuban dissident movement
- Apostasy
- Desertion
- Defector
- Dissent
- Ideocracy
- Hate speech
- Opposition (politics)
- Political dissent
- Political prisoner
- Prisoner of conscience
- Resistance movement
- Speaking truth to power
