= Abdul Kahar Othman =

Singaporean drug convict executed in 2022

Abdul Kahar bin Othman
- Born: 1954; Singapore
- Died: 30 March 2022 (aged 68); Changi Prison, Singapore
- Cause of death: Execution by hanging
- Criminal charges: Two charges of drug trafficking (2010); Several miscellaneous drug offences (between 1972 and 1995)
- Penalty: Death (4 February 2015); Ten years' preventive detention (1995–2005); Several unspecified jail terms (served between 1972 and 1995)

Abdul Kahar bin Othman (1954 – 30 March 2022) was a Singaporean drug trafficker who was found guilty in 2013 of two charges of trafficking a total of 66.77 grams of heroin in Singapore, and later sentenced to death by the High Court in February 2015. After the end of his trial, Abdul Kahar tried to appeal the verdict but the courts dismissed his legal challenges and upheld his death sentence.

It was not until seven years later when Abdul Kahar's execution date was finally scheduled on 30 March 2022. Despite the appeals by human rights activists to the Government of Singapore to commute his sentence, Abdul Kahar was hanged as scheduled at Changi Prison, and he was 68 years old at the time of his execution. Abdul Kahar was the first person to be hanged in Singapore during the COVID-19 pandemic in the country itself.

== Early life ==
=== Childhood and marriage ===
Born in Singapore in 1954, Abdul Kahar bin Othman was the eldest son in a family of seven children, and he grew up in Henderson. His father, who served in the British army, died at age 40 during Abdul Kahar's childhood years, leaving his mother as the sole breadwinner and caregiver of her children. She had to work low-wage contract jobs (including at construction sites and shipyards) to make ends meet.

As there were times the family had to starve due to lack of income and insufficient food, Abdul Kahar and his younger brothers Abdul Mutalib and Abdul Jabar resorted to stealing food from the coffee shops and they did not receive much education in their younger days. Abdul Kahar was described as a good son and sibling who took care of his mother and younger siblings. In his adult years, Abdul Kahar married an unnamed woman, but the couple had no children. At the time of Abdul Kahar's arrest in 2010, his wife was residing in Indonesia.

=== Criminal record ===
Abdul Kahar first broke the law at around 18 years of age, and he had been going in and out of prison for various offences, mostly drug crimes. Abdul Kahar's heroin addiction from his youth also led to him spending time at the state-run drug rehabilitation centres for several times. He even served a sentence of ten years' preventive detention from 1995 to 2005 due to his recalcitrance and long criminal record. Preventive detention in Singapore is a special type of imprisonment reserved for recalcitrant offenders aged at least 30 years old and have at least three previous convictions since turning 16, and this detention order, which may last between seven and 20 years, do not allow an early release on parole for good behaviour. During his frequent periods of incarceration, Abdul Kahar reportedly did not receive much support and rehabilitation to enable him to assimilate into society completely.

After his release in February 2005, Abdul Kahar found difficulty in adjusting to the outside world as a result of his criminal record and he himself spending most of his life in prison than outside. He was later employed by his brother Abdul Mutalib, who operated a furniture business. During his time at his brother's company, Abdul Kahar became a diligent and hard-working employee. He also formed a good relationship with his nieces and took care of his mother faithfully. However, after Abdul Mutalib sold his business, Abdul Kahar was once again jobless.

== Drug trafficking and sentence ==
=== Arrest and conviction ===
Five years after he was released from prison, Abdul Kahar re-offended and was once again arrested on 6 July 2010 for another offence, this time for capital drug trafficking. A search was conducted by the officers from Central Narcotics Bureau and a total of 26.13g of diamorphine (or pure heroin) was found in Abdul Kahar's motor car, which he drove from Boon Lay Way into Jurong Town Hall Road before he encountered the narcotics police. A second search was conducted at Abdul Kahar's flat (where his brother and mother also lived), and another 40.64g of diamorphine were also found inside Abdul Kahar's bedroom. Thus, Abdul Kahar was brought to court for two charges of drug trafficking. for trafficking 26.13g of diamorphine and 40.64g of diamorphine respectively. As the total amount of drugs exceeded the legal minimum of 15g, Abdul Kahar would face the mandatory death penalty if found guilty under the laws of Singapore.

In his account to the police and court, Abdul Kahar stated that he knew a man named Latif in Malaysia, and befriended him after a few meetings. He said that Latif met him on the same day he was arrested, at the void deck of his residential block, and received a request from Latif to help him keep a bag, which he claimed had something related to his work in Malaysia. In the first occasion, Abdul Kahar kept a dark blue bag in his bedroom after receiving it from Latif; the bag contained the 40.64g of diamorphine found in his home. In the second occasion, Abdul Kahar once again received another bag, a red coloured one which also contained what Latif claimed also had to do with his work; the red bag contained the 26.13g of diamorphine that the narcotics police discovered in his motor car. From this, Abdul Kahar tried to claim that he had no knowledge of the drugs and was deceived by Latif in helping him to safekeep the bags. However, there were evidence which proven that Abdul Kahar had knowledge of the drugs and there were also a total sum of over $100,000 in cash found in his home, indicating these to be the criminal proceeds he received from trafficking diamorphine. There were evidence which also showed signs of the drugs being re-packed by Abdul Kahar for the purposes of trafficking.

After standing trial in the High Court, Abdul Kahar was found guilty of drug trafficking on 27 August 2013, but sentencing was postponed in light of the newly enacted death penalty laws more than seven months earlier, in order to certify if Abdul Kahar was merely a drug courier. The reforms of the death penalty laws stated that a drug convict would not face the death penalty and only receive life imprisonment on the condition that he/she was only acting as a courier or suffering from a mental illness. Two months later, the High Court judge Choo Han Teck ruled in a follow-up judgement that Abdul Kahar was indeed a courier and gave him the benefit of the doubt, which would spare him from a death sentence. However, Justice Choo chose to postpone his sentencing till a later date.

=== Prosecution's appeal, re-trial and sentence ===
Subsequently, the prosecution filed an appeal against the October 2013 verdict, which was simultaneously heard with another prosecution's appeal against the case of another drug trafficker Chum Tat Suan, who was also judged as a courier by the same judge. Chum was arrested in an unrelated case on 16 January 2010 for trafficking 94.96g of diamorphine. Both appeals were allowed by the apex court in November 2014, which quashed both the courier verdicts against the two drug traffickers, and the three-judge panel of the Court of Appeal ordered both cases to be sent back to the High Court for a re-trial to test if they were really couriers. The panel made clear that the meaning of a courier is limited only to transporting, sending or delivering the drug; if a drug trafficker is found to have any intention of selling the drug, he/she would not be considered as a mere courier.

In Abdul Kahar's case, the three judges - Tay Yong Kwang, Woo Bih Li and Chao Hick Tin - held that the judge was wrong to consider him as a courier by disagreeing with a ruling that repacking and collecting payments were "ancillary acts" not excluded from the definition of courier, while in Chum's case, they judged that the High Court judge was incorrect to hold that it was unsafe to explore the evidence from the first phase of the trial to decide if he was a courier, while noting that the evidence of Chum's mental state should have been presented earlier in the original trial.

Subsequently, while 68-year-old Chum Tat Suan was eventually certified as a courier and sentenced to life imprisonment on 7 March 2016 (with his sentence backdated to the date of his arrest), it was the opposite for 61-year-old Abdul Kahar bin Othman, who was not found to be a courier in a re-trial and thus sentenced to death by hanging on 4 February 2015. Abdul Kahar's appeal against the death sentence was dismissed on 1 October 2015. A judicial review application filed in 2016 to challenge the Public Prosecutor's decision not to grant Abdul Kahar a certificate was also dismissed.

== Subsequent legal proceedings ==
On 16 August 2018, while he still remained on death row at Changi Prison, Abdul Kahar filed for an application to reopen his case through his lawyer Rupert Seah. Seah, in the application, argued against the constitutionality of the alternative sentencing regime in the Misuse of Drugs Act, stating that it violates the principles of equality before the law and separation of powers. After hearing it and several other arguments relating to other constitutionality issues of the law, the Court of Appeal dismissed the application. In their written grounds of decision published on 25 October 2018, the five-judge panel - consisting of Chief Justice Sundaresh Menon, Judges of Appeal Tay Yong Kwang, Belinda Ang and Judith Prakash and Senior Judge Chao Hick Tin - stated that Abdul Kahar had no basis in to reopen the case, and based on the requirements to reopen concluded cases laid out by Kho Jabing's case, Abdul Kahar had not passed the test.

Besides the fact that some of these arguments were already raised in his previous appeals, his overall arguments that the law was unconstitutional would not have affected the case's outcome, and therefore could not establish a "miscarriage of justice" to justify any reopening of his case. As for Abdul Kahar's argument that it was unconstitutional for the Public Prosecutor to determine whether a drug courier has provided substantive assistance to the Central Narcotics Bureau (which would have warranted a life sentence in lieu of death), they found no merit in this argument and that it had already been rejected in a previous case. A rights activist later revealed in 2022 through Twitter that Abdul Kahar's clemency petition was rejected by President Halimah Yacob in July 2019.

The prosecution also initiated confiscation proceedings to confiscate the monetary benefits (which amounted to $167,429.51 in total) received by Abdul Kahar from his drug trafficking crimes, and the confiscation order was granted by the High Court. Abdul Kahar later challenged the decision to allow the prosecution's application for the said confiscation order, but the Court of Appeal dismissed his appeal on 30 March 2021.

== Execution ==
=== Death warrant and hanging ===
Eventually, a year later, Abdul Kahar's death warrant was finalized and on 23 March 2022, his family were notified that Abdul Kahar was due to hang at dawn on 30 March 2022, three days before Ramadan, an annual festive Muslim fasting period.

After the execution notice was issued, there were appeals made by rights activists, including Kokila Annamalai and Kirsten Han, as well as international groups, including the United Nations Human Rights office, to the Government of Singapore to spare Abdul Kahar's life and commute his sentence to life imprisonment. This was done during the time when Singapore faced international pressure to not execute Nagaenthran K. Dharmalingam, a Malaysian drug convict who reportedly had both low IQ and an alleged intellectual disability. In the last prison visit which Abdul Kahar received, he told both Han and Kokila that he wanted to live.

Despite the efforts, 68-year-old Abdul Kahar, who did not file a last-minute appeal to delay or review his execution, was hanged at Changi Prison as scheduled on the morning of 30 March 2022, and he became the first person to be executed in Singapore during the COVID-19 pandemic. Abdul Kahar's execution was also the first to be carried out since 22 November 2019, when Singapore last executed 36-year-old Malaysian Abd Helmi Abd Halim for heroin trafficking.

In the year 2022 itself, a total of eleven executions, including Abdul Kahar's, had been officially carried out in Singapore, all for drug offences.

=== Funeral and reactions ===
Abdul Kahar's funeral was conducted shortly after his body was returned to his brother, who reclaimed it. His family remembered him as "a gentle older brother, a doting uncle, a loving son" in their statement made after Abdul Kahar died; they were also heartbroken over his death. A candlelight vigil was held outside Changi Prison and attended by Kirsten Han and several of her supporters and fellow activists during the early hours of 30 March before dawn on the day Abdul Kahar was hanged.

Both the European Union (EU) and Amnesty International, in response to Abdul Kahar's execution, criticised the decision to hang Abdul Kahar, as they claimed that the death penalty failed to act as an effective deterrent to crime and was a cruel and unusual punishment; they also stated they will continue to push for Singapore to resume its moratorium and abolish the death penalty in accordance to the international trend. Citing the two unrelated cases of Abdul Kahar and Nagaenthran, the Global Commission on Drug Policy stated that the death penalty was an inappropriate response to any offences, including drug-related crimes. The ASEAN Intergovernmental Commission on Human Rights (AICHR) was also criticised for keeping silent and not intervening on the issue of Abdul Kahar's death penalty. It was also claimed that Abdul Kahar did not have access to a lawyer, which was why he did not appeal before his sentence was carried out.

Many civil groups and rights activists also expressed fears that since Singapore resumed executions through Abdul Kahar's death penalty, there may be more executions to come in the city-state in order to accommodate the growing death row population at Changi Prison, especially when drug convict Nagaenthran K. Dharmalingam lost his final appeal against his death sentence the day before Abdul Kahar was hanged. When the Speakers' Corner at Hong Lim Park was re-opened in April 2022 due to the easing of COVID-19 restrictions and rules, a protest was conducted at the park to show opposition to the government's use of the death penalty in light of both Abdul Kahar's execution and Nagaenthran's failed appeal, and 400 Singaporeans and PRs, including activists Kirsten Han, Kokila Annamalai and Jolovan Wham, attended the event.

Despite the fact that Singapore faced international pressure to not carry out their pending executions of drug traffickers, it was revealed earlier in the same month Abdul Kahar was executed, a 2021 survey result showed that more than 80% of Singaporeans believed that the death penalty should remain in Singapore due to its deterrent effect and relevance in fighting crime, and the government maintained its stand that the death penalty is effective in deterring serious crimes through its parliamentary findings the year before.

=== Aftermath ===
On 27 June 2022, it was reported that several people including activists Kirsten Han and Rocky Howe were investigated by police for illegally organising three public assemblies outside Changi Prison without a police permit to show their opposition to the death penalty and support for Abdul Kahar and another drug convict Nagaenthran K. Dharmalingam before their executions on 30 March 2022 and 27 April 2022 respectively. Han and Howe were also asked by police to submit their anti-death penalty slogan shirts, handphones and other possessions as evidence for upcoming police investigations.

== See also ==
- Capital punishment in Singapore
- Misuse of Drugs Act (Singapore)
- Kho Jabing
- List of cases affected by the Kho Jabing case
