= Lisa Beyer =

American journalist

- Born: 1961 or 1962 (age 64–65)
- Education: University of Texas at Austin (B.J., 1983)
- Occupation: Journalist
- Employer: Time (1988-2007)

Lisa Beyer (born 1961 or 1962) is an American journalist and editor. Beyer worked at Time magazine from 1988 until early 2007, serving as the magazine's bureau chief in Jerusalem between 1991 and 2000. After leaving Time, she served as vice president of communications at the International AIDS Vaccine Initiative (IAVI).

== Career ==
Beyer began her career as an editor for the Daily Texan in the early 1980s, serving as editor-in-chief for 1982-1983, while also working part-time for the Austin American-Statesman.

In 1983, Beyer was awarded a Henry Luce Scholarship where she was able to travel to Hong Kong working for Asiaweek as a staff writer. After the completion of her scholarship in 1985, she continued with Asiaweek as a journalist in Singapore. While there, she drew ire from the Singaporean government in for reporting on Operation Spectrum in September 1987. In May 1988, the magazine told Beyer they were relocating her to Hong Kong to prevent government restrictions on the magazine's circulation. Beyer resigned in June 1988.

She began working for TIME magazine as a staff writer in 1988. In November 1990, she became an associate editor in their World section. While in this position, she reported from Israel, Egypt, Jordan, Syria and Bahrain, and covered the Gulf War.

Beyer served as Time bureau chief in Jerusalem beginning in 1991. During her time there, she interviewed Yasser Arafat, Yitzhak Rabin, Benjamin Netanyahu, and Ehud Barak. In 1995, she covered the assassination of Yitzhak Rabin while on maternity leave with her six-week-old son.

In 2000, she left Jerusalem to begin working in New York City as a Senior Editor for TIME magazine. She worked as an editor in the Society section until October 2001. At that point, she was switched to the World section as a foreign editor, given her knowledge of Middle Eastern politics and Islamic extremism in the wake of the 9/11 attacks. She remained in the position until at least 2003, and covered the death of Yasser Arafat for the magazine in 2004.

In 2007, she joined the International AIDS Vaccine Initiative as vice president of communications, remaining with the organization until at least 2013.

Beyer has published columns at Bloomberg since at least 2013.

== Awards and honors ==
- 1983 Henry Luce Scholar
- 2003 Outstanding Young Texas Ex

== Personal life and education ==
A native of Lafayette Parish, Louisiana, Beyer was raised by a "lapsed Cajun Catholic" mother and a Pentecostal father.

Beyer studied journalism at the University of Texas at Austin, graduating in 1983.

Beyer has also lived in Austin, Texas, Hong Kong, Singapore and now resides in New York City.

While working as Time bureau chief in Jerusalem, she met American-Israeli magazine editor Ze'ev Chafets, whom she married in 1994. She was his third wife and they had two children, whom they raised as Reform Jews. After living in Israel for nine years, the couple moved to Pelham, New York in late 2000.
