= Tan Wah Piow =

Singaporean activist

- 陳華彪
- Born: 1948 (age 77–78); Singapore
- Citizenship: Singaporean (1948–1987); British
- Education: University of Singapore; Balliol College, University of Oxford
- Occupation: lawyer
- Spouse: Chew Beng Lan
- Children: 1 son

Tan Wah Piow (simplified Chinese: 陈华彪; traditional Chinese: 陳華彪; pinyin: Chén Huábiāo) (born 1948) is a Singaporean-born British lawyer and former student leader who has lived in political exile in London, United Kingdom, since 1976. In 1987, the Singaporean government accused him of being the mastermind behind Operation Spectrum, an alleged Marxist conspiracy to overthrow the government and establish a Marxist state. This operation resulted in the arrest of over two dozen individuals. According to state media, Tan had been influenced by Marxist ideology since the early 1970s. In response to these allegations, the government revoked his citizenship in 1987. He has not returned to Singapore since his departure in 1976.

== Early beginnings ==
Tan was born in Singapore in 1948. Tan was president of the University of Singapore's Students' Union (USSU) in 1974. In his time there, Tan mobilized students to become active for democracy and social justice. He was purportedly involved in an industrial dispute which led to his arrest in November 1974 for unlawful assembly and rioting. Tan had allegedly instigated workers of American Marine (Singapore) to agitate against their employers. Tan was eventually convicted and sentenced to one year's imprisonment. In his judgement, Senior District Judge Mr T.S. Sinnathuray said: "The defence of a frame-up is a miserable and mischievous attempt that had altogether, failed." "On the other hand, it has been proved to the hilt that the three accused and their witnesses have fabricated evidence to pervert the course of justice in the hope that they would succeed in creating a reasonable doubt that would entitled them an acquittal."

Tan subsequently fled to Britain with Chew Beng Lan, his future wife, in 1976 on a Singaporean passport with forged renewal endorsement and sought political asylum. He later went to Balliol College, University of Oxford to study law, and worked as a human rights lawyer who specialises in asylum and refugee cases.

== FUEMSSO ==
According to unverified government statements, Tan is supposed to have continued with his political activities even though he denies this. His plan is supposed to have been to achieve political power through infiltration of mainstream organisations such as schools and unions to mobilise workers and establish strong grassroots support. To achieve that, Tan allegedly established himself as the leader of the Federation of United Kingdom and Eire Malaysian and Singapore Students' Organisations (FUEMSSO), which was used to recruit supporters for his cause.

Through FUEMSSO, Tan succeeded in recruiting several activists for his plans. Upon their return to Singapore, these students were supposed to join forces with a local group led by Vincent Cheng (one of those detained under Operation Spectrum) to penetrate lawful organisations and eventually dominate them, in preparation for Tan's seizure of political power, according to the Singapore government.

Tan and his group also used FUEMSSO to launch a number of strident campaigns against the Singapore and Malaysian Governments. Most significantly, Tan and his group actively campaigned under detention in Singapore and Malaysia, demanding for the abolishment of detention without trial and immediate release of those under detention.

== Tan Wah Piow responds ==
In his book, "Let the people judge – Confessions of the most wanted person in Singapore" published 10 June 1987, Tan Wah Piow related that, "Circumstances surrounding the call-up were most extraordinary and improper...The facts are simple. I was conscripted into the army to serve in the artillery unit on the very hour of my release from the one year sentence." He says, "I too was worried for my physical well-being since 'accidents' can easily happen in the army."

Referring to the government's charges against him, Tan said, "I have stated in no uncertain terms that I am not involved in any conspiracy to overthrow the government. I have publicly expressed my opposition to any attempt, by anyone, to set up a communist state in Singapore." "As to how we bring about the implementation of the political programmes in Singapore, I stated in no uncertain terms in my writings, letters to friends and public speeches in the United Kingdom, that I sought to bring about political change in Singapore solely through the ballot box."

On his one-year prison term, Tan alleged that the illegal assembly and riot which took place at the Pioneer Industries Employees Union (PIEU) headquarters in the Jurong Industrial Estate was a 'frame-up" involving Phey Yew Kok, who was then the general secretary of PIEU. He claimed that it was "union officers" themselves who smashed up their own premises at the PIEU and says that at the time of the incident, he was instead seen outside the PIEU office by a Straits Times reporter, among others.

In 2016, after Phey's conviction for criminal breach of trust in 2016, Tan wrote to the Attorney-General V. K. Rajah to quash his 1975 criminal conviction for rioting. However, AGC stated that it is unable to quash Tan's conviction as it can only be done by the Court in Singapore. The AGC also stated that Mr Tan could have appealed his conviction in 1975, which he did not.
