= Linda Chen =

Chinese-born, Singaporean linguist, writer

- 陳蒙鶴
- Linda Chen
- Born: Chen Mong Hock; 1928; Wenzhou, Zhejiang Province, Republic of China
- Died: 29 December 2002 (aged 73–74); Singapore
- Other names: Linda Chen Mong Hock; Linda Chen Meng Hock; Linda Chen Mock Hock
- Occupations: Linguist; writer; feminist; businesswoman
- Years active: 1950–2002
- Spouse: Tan Seng Huat (m. 1958–2002)
- Children: 3

Linda Chen (Chinese: 陳蒙鶴; also known as Linda Chen Mock Hock or Linda Chen Mong Hock; 1928 – 29 December 2002) was a Chinese-born, Singaporean linguist, writer, feminist and businesswoman. Having immigrated from China as a young child, Chen learned Chinese, English, and Malay; she used her linguistic abilities to write a Malay-Chinese dictionary that became widely used to teach Malay in the 1950s and 1960s. As a student, she was active in the anti-colonial and women's rights movement. Because of her activism and heritage, she was seen as a threat and a ring-leader of communist infiltration into the country. Despite her denying that she was a communist, she was arrested in 1956 and jailed for 20 months, detained and kept under surveillance for four years between 1959 and 1963, and rearrested in 1963 as part of Operation Coldstore. After her release from prison, she lived in London for four years and then returned to Singapore, where she managed her family's multi-national book store until her death.

== Biography ==
Linda Chen was born in 1928 in Wenzhou, Zhejiang Province. As a child, she immigrated from China to Singapore along with her parents and attended both Chinese and English schools. Her father, Chen Yoh Shoo, was a wealthy businessman in Singapore.

In 1951, she began studying Malay language and literature at the University of Malaya in Singapore. She joined the University Socialist Club shortly after starting college. She was also one of the founders of the Pan-Malayan Students’ Federation (PMSF). Her undergraduate honors thesis focused on the Malay-Muslim scholar Syed Sheikh al-Hadi. After graduation, she worked briefly as an English teacher at Chung Cheng High School before beginning her master's degree. During this period, she compiled a Malay-Chinese dictionary and translated several Chinese children's stories into Malay.

As a fluent speaker of English, Chinese, and Malay, Chen was able to bridge language divides and facilitate collaboration between various student organizations. She worked as an editor on the PMSF newsletter The Malayan Student Chinese edition. Her influence cause her to be placed under surveillance by the British authorities who feared communist expansion and saw the student activists creation of left-wing, united fronts as fertile ground for the spread of communism. She became president of the Singapore Anti-Yellow Cultural Council (SAYCC), which the students classified as an organized effort to rid society of hedonistic Western influence and did not necessarily consider themselves to be communists. The government saw the student movement as a threat to the existing government and a communist front.

In 1956, Chen founded the Singapore Women's Federation (SWF) as a group to press for women's rights and simultaneously fight against colonialism and a social order which favored the English. She and other radicals believed women's struggle for equality was linked to social change and class struggle. The organization was shut down immediately and Chen was arrested, accused of being a security threat. The government issued a statement that she was to be deported to China, but some legislators argued that since she had lived in Singapore since she was five, she was not an alien. Both Chen and her parents plead for her to be sent to Britain to finish her studies. She spent 20 months in prison before her release in 1958. That same year she married Tan Seng Huat, who she had met during her student days. She became a lecturer in the History of Southeast Asia at Nanyang University and completed her masters with a thesis on Early Chinese Newspapers in Singapore: 1881-1912. She returned to women's rights issues and participated in the debates and planning for the Women's Charter to revise the marriage laws of Singapore.

In 1959, Chen was detained because security officials claimed she had been studying the history of the Soviet Union and communism. They accused Chen of leading a network of students and infiltrating middle schools with radical ideas and material through her associations with the University of Malaya and Abdullah Majid, who headed the Socialist Club's Research Committee. Both she and Majid were kept under surveillance as suspected communists and by 1960, security was gathering on the activities of Chen's husband, sister and sister-in-law, as well. The Special Branch believed that Chen was at the center of the communist web in Singapore and she was re-arrested in February 1963 during "Operation Coldstore". She was released on 21 June 1964 and issued a statement that she was not a communist, though in her youth she had been in favor of socialism, and that she believed she had been fighting against colonial policies.

After her release, Chen accompanied her husband to London where he completed his graduate studies. The couple returned to Singapore in 1967 and Chen took over her family's business, the Shanghai Book Store, which had branches in Singapore and Kuala Lumpur. That same year, her master's thesis was published in English by the University of Malaya Press and became the standard text of the origin of Singapore's Chinese newspapers.

In 1990, Chen published the article "65 Years of Chinese Book Industry in Singapore (1925-1990)" in a commemorative journal marking the 65th anniversary of the Shanghai Book Store. In 1999, her undergraduate work on Al-Hadi was published by the Asian Institute of Sociology of Kuala Lumpur. In her later years, she became involved as volunteer staff for the women's organization Action and Research Association (AWARE), which she participated in until her death on 29 December 2002, in Singapore.

== Legacy ==
Chen's Malay-Chinese dictionary was widely used to teach those learning Malay in the 1950s and 1960s. Her master's thesis was translated into Chinese in 2009 and a book launching ceremony to honor Chen was held by the China Institute of Malaysia and the Nanyang Technological University Education and Research Foundation.
