= Tang Fong Har =

Singaporean lawyer (1943-)

- 陳鳳霞
- Born: 1943 (age 82–83)
- Education: National University of Singapore
- Occupation: lawyer
- Spouse: Peter Poon
- Children: 2

Tang Fong Har (simplified Chinese: 陈凤霞; traditional Chinese: 陳鳳霞; pinyin: Chén Fèngxiá; born 1943) is a Singaporean lawyer who was detained on 20 June 1987 by the Singapore government during Operation Spectrum under the Internal Security Act (ISA). She eventually left the country in 1988 and has not returned to the country ever since.

== Education ==
Tang studied law at the National University of Singapore and graduated in 1980.

== Operation Spectrum ==
In 1987, Tang was detained by the Internal Security Department (ISD) during Operation Spectrum. She subsequently accused Officer SK Tan of assaulting her during her interrogation and indefinite detention by the Internal Security Department.

Her detention was speculated by many as a means to crush political dissent. In a letter, she states that she was physically abused, kept incommunicado and forced to admit guilt of subversion of state. She was later released on 12 September 1987.

In 1988, Tang was granted permission to visit her husband, Peter, a British citizen, in the United Kingdom between 7 March 1988 to 7 April 1988 but had since not returned to Singapore. She was subsequently wanted by the Singapore Police Force (SPF) for breaching her terms with the ISD for her visit to Britain. On 18 April 1988, Tang with eight of the ex-detainees from Operation Spectrum issued a joint statement accusing the government of ill treatment and torture while under detention. They also denied involvement in any conspiracy and alleged that they were pressured into making confessions.

On 8 October 2011, Tang, along with exiled political dissident Francis Seow, publicly addressed a Singapore Democratic Party (SDP) forum from abroad via teleconference. In the address they advocated abolishing the ISA. The SPF investigated the legality of the event the following day.

== Personal life ==
Tang, her husband Peter Poon Cheuk Yeung, and children, a son and daughter, currently reside in Hong Kong.
