= Jolovan Wham =

Singaporean activist

- 范国瀚
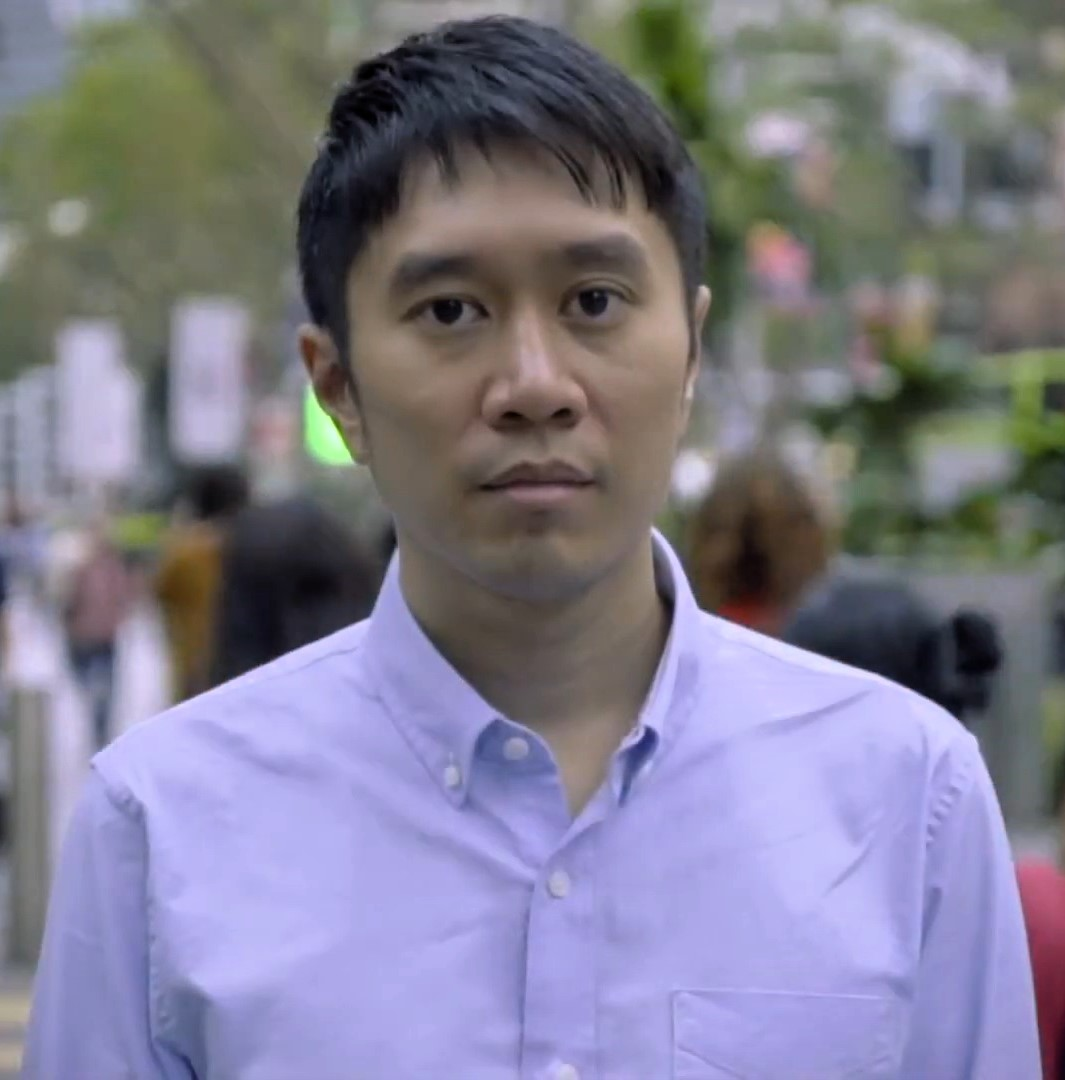
- Wham in 2018
- Born: Wham Kwok Han Jolovan; 16 December 1980 (age 45); Singapore
- Education: National University of Singapore
- Occupation: activist
- Organization: Humanitarian Organization for Migration Economics
- Father: Johnny Wham

Jolovan Wham Kwok Han (simplified Chinese: 范国瀚; traditional Chinese: 範國瀚; pinyin: Fàn Guóhàn; born 16 December 1979) is a Singaporean activist. He is a founding member and the previous executive director of the Humanitarian Organisation for Migration Economics (HOME), before stepping down to serve in his current role as the organisation's social worker, where he is involved in supporting and organising the migrant worker community. The International Federation for Human Rights has stated that he has been the target of judicial harassment, while Amnesty International have stated that "Singapore authorities have repeatedly sought to make an example of his activism to deter Singaporeans who might dare criticize the government."

== Biography ==
Jolovan Wham is the son of Singaporean multi-millionaire businessman Johnny Wham, who built one of Singapore's most successful jewelry retailing business Goldheart Jewelry in the 70s. Johnny Wham is CEO of Platim Holdings Pte Ltd which owns Platim Jewelry, a retail jewelry business operating at Orchard Towers. Johnny Wham is also the owner of Jamboree Bar and Cafe, a high-end bar catering to the local expat community, which is also based in Orchard Towers.

In March 2019, Singaporean authorities launched an investigation for illegal public assembly after Wham had posted a photo on social media of himself holding a sign calling for charges against the editors of The Online Citizen to be dropped.

In March 2020, Wham was fined for contempt of court after having made a Facebook post the previous year criticising the lack of independence of Singapore's courts. After refusing to pay the fine, he was sentenced to a one-week jail term.

In May 2020, Wham posted a letter of apology to Minister of Manpower Josephine Teo after she threatened to sue him over accusations of corruption.

In November 2020, Wham was charged with illegal public assembly by Singaporean authorities after having held up a cardboard poster of a smiley-face outside of a police station in support of two climate activists who had been issued with summons for interrogation by police. He was sentenced to either a S$3000 fine or 15 days' jail, if not paid. After failing to appeal the charges, Wham chose to serve the jail time.

When a 68-year-old Singaporean named Abdul Kahar Othman was sentenced to death and hanged at Changi Prison on 30 March 2022 for drug trafficking, Jolovan Wham organised and spoke at a 400-men protest at Hong Lim Park to show opposition to the Singapore government's use of the death penalty on 3 April 2022, and urged the government to abolish capital punishment, especially when another drug trafficker and Malaysian Nagaenthran K. Dharmalingam was at risk of imminent execution due to him losing his final appeal five days before. Nagaenthran was hanged on 27 April 2022 at age 34.

In February 2025, Wham was charged by Singaporean authorities for violations of the Public Order Act over organising the candlelight vigils for death row prisoners. He was fined S$10,500 in May 2026. In September 2026, he received an additional four charges under the Public Order Act and one for refusing to answer questions from a public servant.

== See also ==
- List of Singaporean dissidents
