= Francis Seow =

Singaporean former politician and lawyer (1928–2016)

- 萧添寿
- Seow in 1968
- Born: Seow Tiang Siew; 11 October 1928; Singapore, Straits Settlements
- Died: 21 January 2016 (aged 87); Boston, Massachusetts, United States
- Education: Saint Joseph's Institution; Middle Temple
- Occupations: Writer; lawyer; politician
- Known for: Being the prosecutor of several sensational murder trials in Singapore (eg. Sunny Ang and Mimi Wong), the president of the Law Society of Singapore and later being a political dissident in Singapore
- Political party: Workers' Party (1988)
- Spouse: Rauni Marjatta Kivilaakso (m. 1953; div. 1987)
- Children: 2 sons and 2 daughters

Francis Seow Tiang Siew (Note: Chinese: 萧添寿; Pe̍h-ūe-jī: Siau Tiang-siū; pinyin: Xiāo Tiānshòu) (11 October 1928 – 21 January 2016), was a Singaporean lawyer who was Solicitor-General of Singapore and later the president of the Law Society of Singapore. During his legal career, he was known for having both prosecuted and represented defendants in highly publicised trials such as Sunny Ang, Mimi Wong, prisoners of the Pulau Senang prison riots and Tan Mui Choo.

Seow started his legal career in 1956 in the Singapore Legal Service, becoming Solicitor-General in 1969 before entering private practice in 1972. After he was elected president of the Law Society of Singapore in 1986, he had a falling-out with Prime Minister Lee Kuan Yew over the Law Society's role in commenting on legislation. He did not serve beyond that year.

After his presidency, Seow increasingly became involved in politics by being critical of the governing People's Action Party (PAP). In the lead up to the 1988 general election, Seow joined the Workers' Party (WP) and contested in the Eunos Group Representation Constituency as a candidate. His team narrowly lost with just 49.11% of the vote. Just prior to the election, Seow was detained for 72 days without trial under the Internal Security Act (ISA) under accusations of receiving foreign campaign donations from the United States.

After the election, he was accused of tax evasion. Seow subsequently left for the United States supposedly for health reasons, disregarding numerous court summons to return to Singapore to stand trial. He was eventually convicted in absentia. Called a "prisoner of conscience" by Amnesty International in 2007, Seow was a frequent speaker at university talks outside of Singapore. He never returned to Singapore and died in Boston in 2016; he was 87.

== Career ==
=== Legal career ===
Seow was born in 1928 in Singapore and educated at Saint Joseph's Institution before he studied law at the Middle Temple and became a qualified lawyer. He joined the Singapore Legal Service in 1956 as a prosecutor and rose through the ranks to become the Solicitor-General in 1969, a position he held until 1971. Seow led a Commission of Inquiry in the Secondary IV examination boycott by Chinese students in 1963. For his work, Seow was awarded the Public Administration Medal (Gold). During his time as a prosecutor, Seow prosecuted multiple notorious murderers and sent them to the gallows, including Sunny Ang, Mimi Wong, and 18 of the prisoners involved in the Pulau Senang prison riot.

Seow eventually left the Singapore Legal Service and entered private practice in 1972. In 1985, he defended Tan Mui Choo, one of the three murderers in the Toa Payoh ritual murders. Tan was eventually executed after an unsuccessful appeal against her conviction and death sentence. In 1973, Seow was suspended from law practice for 12 months by Chief Justice Wee Chong Jin for breaching an undertaking given on behalf of his junior law partner to Attorney-General Tan Boon Teik. Nevertheless, he was later elected as a council member of the Law Society of Singapore in 1976 and became President of the Law Society in 1986.

Seow's new appointment as President of the Law Society led to a falling-out with Prime Minister Lee Kuan Yew after he became embroiled in the politics surrounding the role of the Law Society. Seow had envisaged a restoration of the role of the Law Society to comment on legislation that the government churned out without any meaningful parliamentary debate, to which Lee took special exception. As a result, Lee caused special legislation to be passed that deprived the Law Society of any power to comment on legislation unless specifically asked to by the government. Seow eventually stepped down as President that year.

=== Political career ===
Seow stood for the 1988 general election as a candidate of the opposition Workers' Party team contesting in Eunos Group Representation Constituency against the ruling People's Action Party (PAP). However, his team managed to secure 49.11% of valid votes and lost marginally to the PAP.

Just before the election, on 6 May 1988, Seow was detained without trial under the Internal Security Act (ISA) for 72 days. He was accused of having received political campaign finance from the United States to "promote democracy" in Singapore. According to his account, he was subjected to torture, including sleep deprivation and intensely cold air conditioning. Later, while awaiting trial for alleged tax evasion after the election, he left for the United States for health treatment and disregarded numerous court summons to return to stand trial. Subsequently, he was convicted in absentia.

On 8 October 2011, Seow and Tang Fong Har publicly addressed a Singapore Democratic Party (SDP) forum via teleconferencing. The Singapore Police Force investigated the legality of the event on the following day.

== Personal life ==
Seow married Rauni Marjatta Kivilaakso, who was Finnish, at the Swedish Protestant Church in London in 1953. They had two sons, Ashleigh and Andre, and two daughters, Ingrid Annalisa and Amara. Seow filed for and got a divorce in 1987, citing they had been living apart for four years. Kivilaakso died in 1988 after a long battle with cancer.

While living in exile, Seow spoke at events organised by student societies in universities outside of Singapore. In a 1989 interview in London, Seow told The Sunday Times that he would return to Singapore to face tax evasion charges.

On 16 October 2007, Amnesty International issued a public statement mentioning Seow as one of two prominent Singaporean lawyers who were penalised for exercising their right to express their opinions. The organisation also called him a "prisoner of conscience."

== Death ==
Seow never returned to Singapore and died in Boston on 21 January 2016 at the age of 87. Chee Soon Juan, secretary-general of the SDP, announced the news of Seow's death on his Facebook page. His death was also confirmed by his nephew Mark Looi. Seow was survived by two sons, and two daughters.

== Writings ==
In his semi-autobiography, To Catch a Tartar: A Dissident in Lee Kuan Yew's Prison, Seow wrote about his career in the Singapore Legal Service (SLS), opposition politics and his personal experience of being detained by the Internal Security Department (ISD). He also accused the Singaporean government of authoritarianism under the administration of Lee Kuan Yew's People's Action Party (PAP).

The book also contains a foreword by Devan Nair, the third President of Singapore and a former PAP politician who had a falling out with the government. Seow also wrote another book, The Media Enthralled, which describes how he believes that the PAP has undermined freedom of the press after gaining power and turned the media into pro-government mouthpieces. He is also the author of Beyond Suspicion? – The Singapore Judiciary that explores key cases in which the judiciary had allegedly bowed to political pressure.

== See also ==
- Tang Fong Har
- Internal Security Act
- Operation Spectrum

== Bibliography ==
- Seow, Francis T. (1998). The media enthralled: Singapore revisited. Lynne Rienner Publishers. ISBN 978-1-55587-779-8.
