= Sandrasegaran Woodhull =

Singaporean lawyer and politician (1932–2003)

- Woodhull c. 1958

Vice-Chairman of the Barisan Sosialis
- In office 1961–1963
- Preceded by: Post created
- Succeeded by: See Cheng Kiong

Personal details
- Born: 1932 British Ceylon
- Died: November 26, 2003 (aged 70–71) Singapore
- Resting place: Kuala Lumpur, Malaysia
- Party: People's Action Party (1954–1961); Barisan Sosialis (1961–1963)
- Spouse: Peng Tsu Ping (m. 1962–2003)
- Children: Anashuya Woodhull (daughter); Anuita Woodhull (daughter); Anshumann Woodhull (son)
- Education: University of Malaya
- Occupation: lawyer, former politician
- Profession: law
- Other names: Sandra Woodhull; Sydney Woodhull; Sidney Woodhull

Sandrasegaran "Sidney" Woodhull (1932 – 26 November 2003) was a Singaporean lawyer, former politician and political prisoner. He was a founding member of the University of Malaya's University Socialist Club, and the Singapore's political parties, People's Action Party and the Barisan Sosialis.

== Biography ==
Born in British Ceylon in 1932, Sandrasegaran Woodhull, sometimes referred as "Sandra", "Sydney" or "Sidney" in the press, entered the University of Malaya in 1951 as a Sultan Ibrahim scholar from Johor. He was a founding member of the University Socialist Club in 1953, serving as Financial Secretary in the first Central Working Committee. He was also involved in the Fajar controversy because of his contribution to the Fajar magazine and occasional attendance at group meetings although he was not the member of the Fajar editorial board.

Woodhull eventually became a prominent union advisor and leader of the Singapore Naval Base Labour Union. Together with other trade unionists, Woodhull was officially recruited into the People's Action Party on 21 November 1954. He was detained by the police after the Chinese middle school riots in 1956. Following his release after the PAP gained power in 1959, Woodhull was appointed as the Political Secretary to the Ministry of Health.

Woodhull was one of the thirteen PAP left-wingers who were expelled from the PAP on 20 July 1961, he later joined the Barisan Sosialis on 29 July 1961 as was made its Vice Chairman. On 26 October 1962, Woodhull married Peng Tsu Ping, who was also a graduate of University of Malaya and a librarian at the University of Singapore at the Singapore Registry witnessed by Secretary-General of Barisan Sosialis Lim Chin Siong and Dr Gopal Baratham.

Woodhull was against the PAP proposal for merger with Malaysian Federation, calling it a political "strait jacket". He was arrested and detained without trial under Operation Coldstore in February 1963. He was released afterward and exiled to Kuala Lumpur in November. He later went to London to study law. Woodhull returned to Kuala Lumpur where he was called to the Malaysian Bar in 1967. He was a partner with law firm of Shearn Delamore & Co. He was allowed to return to Singapore in 1990.

He retired from law practice in December 2000.

== Death ==
Woodhull died on 26 November 2003 at the age of 71 at a Singapore Hospital after heart surgery. His wake was held at the Mount Vernon Columbarium at night in 28 November and his cremated remains was later brought back to Kuala Lumpur.

He is survived by his wife Peng, his daughters Anashuya and Anuita, his son Anshumann, and a granddaughter Lara Sayana Bell.

== See also ==
- People's Action Party
- Barisan Sosialis
- Operation Coldstore
