= Poh Soo Kai =

Singaporean doctor, politician and political prisoner

- 傅樹介
- Born: February 5, 1930 (age 96); Singapore, Straits Settlements
- Education: Raffles Institution; University of Malaya
- Occupations: medical doctor, politician
- Known for: Detention without trial under the Preservation of Public Service Security Ordinance during Operation Coldstore in 1963
- Spouse: Grace Lim (div. 1992)
- Relatives: Tan Kah Kee (maternal grandfather)

Poh Soo Kai (Chinese: 傅樹介; pinyin: Fù Shùjiè; born February 5, 1930) is a Singaporean medical doctor, politician, political prisoner. He was a founding member of the University Socialist Club, People's Action Party (PAP) and Barisan Sosialis (BS).

== Early life and education ==
Poh was born in Singapore on February 5, 1930. He is the maternal grandson of prominent businessman Tan Kah Kee. His family fled Singapore before the Japanese invasion and landed in Bombay, he studied at a Catholic mission school for four years. Poh and his family returned to Singapore after the Japanese surrender in 1945, continued his studies at Raffles Institution and entered the University of Malaya in 1950.

Poh was a founding member of the Socialist Club in 1953 and became its second President from August that year till the following year. Poh was one of the eight members of the Fajar editorial board charged with sedition in 1954. He graduated three years later with a degree in medicine.

== Political career ==
Poh became acquainted with Lee Kuan Yew, who was the honorary legal advisor to Fajar, during his time in university. He subsequently became a founding member of the PAP in 1954. When the party split in 1961, he left to join the BS as its Assistant Secretary-General. He was arrested and detained without trial under the Preservation of Public Service Security Ordinance during Operation Coldstore in 1963. Poh denied being a communist subversive and that Operation Coldstore was a political move against Lee's opponents.

He was released in 1973. He was arrested again without trial under the Internal Security Act in 1976 and 1982.

== Medical career ==
After his release in 1982, Poh practised as a doctor for eight years in Singapore.

== Personal life ==
In 1990, Poh moved to Canada and returned to Singapore in 2007.

Poh and Grace Lim (林依珍), also known as Grace Poh, divorced in 1992.

Poh co-edited the book, The Fajar Generation: The University Socialist Club and the Politics of Postwar Malaya and Singapore (2009).

Poh published his memoir titled Living in a Time of Deception in 2016. Based on his own recollection and records of the UK government, he provided a new perspective on key events in the political development of Singapore. His thesis is that Lee's main purpose in seeking independence in conjunction with the merger with the Federation of Malaysia was to leverage the Malaysian government to immobilize his left-wing opponents and that Lee feared that the left wing led by Lim Chin Siong would have defeated him in free elections.

His ex-wife Grace Lim died on 26 October 2025 at the age of 91.
