= Lim Hock Siew =

Singaporean politician and physician

Dr. Lim Hock Siew
- 林福寿
- Born: 21 February 1931; Singapore, Straits Settlements
- Died: 4 June 2012 (aged 81); Parkway East Hospital, Singapore
- Resting place: Kong Meng San Phor Kark See Monastery
- Education: Raffles Institution; University of Malaya
- Occupations: politician, medical doctor
- Political party: People's Action Party (1954–1961); Barisan Sosialis (1961–1963)
- Spouse: Beatrice Chen (m. 1961)
- Children: 1

Lim Hock Siew (simplified Chinese: 林福寿; traditional Chinese: 林福壽; pinyin: Lín Fúshòu; Pe̍h-ōe-jī: Lîm Hok-siū; 21 February 1931 – 4 June 2012) was a Singaporean politician, political prisoner and medical doctor.

== Education ==
Lim attended the Rangoon Road School and then the Raffles Institution. Then he studied medicine at the University of Malaya. At university, he was a committed founder-member of the University Socialist Club (USC) and a leader of the university's student union.

== Career ==
=== Political career ===
In 1953, he met Lee Kuan Yew, then a young lawyer helping to defend eight USC students charged for sedition by the British. They won the case and the USC rallied behind Lee Kuan Yew and his associates when they formed the People's Action Party (PAP) in 1954. Lim was a member of the PAP from its inception until 1961, and as its member campaigned in the 1955 and 1959 Singapore general elections.

On 26 July 1961, thirteen left-wing PAP assemblymen who had abstained in a crucial vote of confidence for the government held five days earlier were expelled from the PAP. Lim left the PAP on his own accord and resigned from his government service doctor post in 1961.

In the same year, he became a member of the Barisan Sosialis, a party which was formed in 1961 by the 13 expelled PAP assemblymen and 6 prominent left-leaning trade unions leaders.

==== Political detention ====
On 2 February 1963, along with over 110 other leftists and unionists, Lim was arrested during Operation Coldstore, a massive security crackdown ordered by the government and targeted at communists and alleged communists. Immediately after his arrest, he was detained without trial indefinitely under the Internal Security Act. At the time of his arrest he was only 32 years old and his son was just 5 months old. During his two-decade-long detention at Changi Prison, he constantly refused to repudiate his political beliefs despite being given every opportunity to do so.

About 9 years into his detention, he was asked to sign a statement committing to support the democratic system in Singapore, and not to participate in politics. He refused, pointing out that the two demands were contradictory: if a democratic system really existed in Singapore, then there would be no reason for him to be deprived of his right to participate in politics.

==== Release from detention ====
He was released from political detention on 6 September 1982 and was Singapore’s second-longest-serving political prisoner after Chia Thye Poh. After his release, Lim repeatedly called for the abolition of the Internal Security Act (ISA).

In 1980, Amnesty International issued a public statement naming Lim as a "prisoner of conscience."

In September 2011, together with 15 former ISA detainees, he issued two joint statements calling for the abolition of the Act and the setting up of an independent Commission of Inquiry to investigate the allegations made against ISA detainees. Lim also sued book publisher Editions Didier Millet, the National Library Board, Peter Lim and Tien Wah Press in 2011 over a news item in a book, Chronicle Of Singapore: Fifty Years Of Headline News (1959-2009).

=== Medical career ===
After his release from detention, Lim worked at the Rakyat Clinic (人民药房) along Balestier Road as a general practitioner, together with Dr Mohd Abu Bakar. He not only dispensed free medicine for poor patients, but also gave them transport money to go home.

== Personal life ==
Lim was the second of ten children of a fishmonger.

Lim married Dr Beatrice Chen Tsung Mong (1932–2025) in October 1961 and their only son, Lim Yue Wen, was born in 1962.

== Death ==
Lim had been suffering from kidney failure for three years since 2009 but, according to his family, had otherwise been in good health until he bumped his head at home at the end of May 2012 and was sent to hospital. He was in stable condition at the Parkway East Hospital, but experienced a fatal heart attack at 10:30 PM on 4 June 2012.

Lim's funeral was held on 8 June 2012 and he was cremated on the same day at the crematorium at Kong Meng San Phor Kark See Monastery.
