= Vincent Cheng Kim Chuan =

Singaporean Catholic social worker

Vincent Cheng Kim Chuan (钟金全) is a Singaporean Catholic social worker who was detained under the Internal Security Act during the 1987 Operation Spectrum for three years.

Cheng was a full-time Catholic Church worker in the Justice and Peace Commission.

== Detention ==
In 1987, Cheng was one of the 22 Singaporeans branded as a "Marxist conspirator" and arrested under Operation Spectrum. He was allegedly to use the Catholic church in Singapore as a "ready cover" to organise the infiltration of disparate groups of influence including the Law Society, the opposition Workers' Party and various student bodies. These would allegedly become pressure groups that would eventually come into open confrontation with the government.

With the exception of Cheng, all the detainees were released, on various dates, before the end of 1987. In 1989, Cheng's detention order was extended by one year. Cheng was conditionally released after three years in mid-June 1990. He had to abide by six restrictive conditions, one of which was not to engage or get involved in any activity that advocated a political cause.

During Cheng's detention, of the detainees, four were re-arrested and were issued with one-year detention orders. As a result, they engaged two Queen's Counsels from the United Kingdom, to apply to the High Court for writs of habeas corpus, a legal action that requires a person under arrest to be brought before a judge to challenge detention lacking sufficient cause or evidence. They were unsuccessful. They then appealed to the Court of Appeal. In a landmark ruling, the Court of Appeal ordered the four detainees to be released but they were immediately re-arrested under new detention orders. The detainees filed fresh applications for writs of habeas corpus, but – with the exception of Teo Soh Lung – later withdrew their applications and were released. Teo's application was dismissed by the High Court after the government amended the Constitution and the Internal Security Act to reverse the Court of Appeal's earlier decision. The amendments were expressed to operate retroactively. The legality of these amendments was unsuccessfully challenged by Teo in Teo Soh Lung v. Minister for Home Affairs (1989–1990) and Cheng in Cheng Vincent v. Minister for Home Affairs (1990).

On 1 January 1994, Amnesty International recognised him as a "prisoner of conscience." The NGO Singaporeans For Democracy (SFD) wrote an official letter of inquiry to the Internal Security Department over the issue.

Cheng and his fellow detainees related some of their experiences, including physical torture, in the book, That We May Dream Again, published in 2009. Cheng has also recounted on his experiences in the blog Singaporerebel.

== Political career ==
On 19 February 2011, Cheng was introduced as a Singapore Democratic Party (SDP) member during the SDP anniversary dinner.

In late August after the 2011 general election, the SDP held a Central Executive Committee election and Cheng was elected to vice-chairman respectively.
