= Criminal law of Singapore =

Although the legal system of Singapore is a common law system, the criminal law of Singapore is largely statutory in nature and historically derives largely from the former Indian penal code. The general principles of criminal law, as well as the elements and penalties of general criminal offences such as assault, criminal intimidation, mischief, grievous hurt, theft, extortion, sex crimes and cheating, are set out in the Singaporean Penal Code. Other serious offences are created by statutes such as the Arms Offences Act, Kidnapping Act, Misuse of Drugs Act and Vandalism Act.

Singapore retains both corporal punishment (in the form of caning) and capital punishment (by hanging) as legal penalties. For certain offences, the imposition of these penalties is mandatory. More than 400 people were executed in Singapore, mostly for drug trafficking, between 1991 and 2004. Statistically, Singapore has one of the highest execution rates in the world relative to its population. Science fiction writer William Gibson famously described Singapore as "Disneyland with the death penalty". (Note: This also refers to Singapore's consistent high score on the World Happiness Report.) Some scholars have argued that one of the results of robust regulations and interventions in Singapore is that the nation has one of the lowest incidences of violent crimes in the world.

== History ==
=== The Penal Code ===
For most of the 19th century, the criminal law which applied in the Straits Settlements (comprising the Prince of Wales' Island (Penang), Singapore and Malacca) was generally that of the United Kingdom. In 1871, the Straits Settlements Penal Code 1871, practically a re-enactment of the Indian Penal Code, was enacted. It came into operation on 16 September 1872. The code then held only two crimes punishable with the death penalty: murder and treason. Judges then had discretion on whether to impose the death sentence or instead sentence the convicted to life imprisonment. In 1883, the Penal Code (Amendment) Ordinance 1883 removed the discretion and imposed a mandatory death penalty on all convicted murderers. In 2012, the penal code was amended for judges to have some discretion in sentencing the death penalty in certain cases of murder.

The penal code has since been amended several times. In 1973, punishments for certain offences were enhanced. The Penal Code (Amendment) Act 1984, which came into effect on 31 August 1984, imposed mandatory minimum penalties for certain offences. A major review of the Code was launched in 2006, which was updated in 2008.

=== Criminal Procedure Code ===
Prior to 1870, criminal procedure law in Singapore was found mainly in the Indian Criminal Procedure Act (ICPA) 1852, as the Indian government then had power to legislate for the Straits Settlements. After the passing of the Singaporean penal code, the ICPA was replaced by the Criminal Procedure Ordinance. Despite the penal code having done away with the division of crimes into felonies and misdemeanours, the criminal procedure system was still maintained the distinction, leading to the passing of the Criminal Procedure Ordinance 1873. The Ordinance also did away with the procedure for indictments and abolished the grand, special, and common juries.

A replacement Code of Criminal Procedure was enacted in 1902. The present Criminal Procedure Code was passed by the Legislative Council of the Colony of Singapore on 28 January 1955. All criminal offences under the Penal Code or other statutes are inquired into and tried according to the Criminal Procedure Code, of which is last revision in 2010.

=== Misuse of Drugs Act ===
In 1973, the Misuse of Drugs Act was passed, with a sentencing maximum of 30 years for drug-related offences. In 1975, the act was amended to impose a mandatory death penalty for select offences.

== Sources of law ==
Unlike the English criminal law, which contains both common-law and statutory crimes, the Singaporean criminal law comprises only crimes listed in statutes. The application of law is guided by case law as well as the Interpretation Act 1965, which requires courts to interpret statutes upon parliamentary intention.

=== Statutes ===
- Penal Code
- Arms Offences Act
- Kidnapping Act
- Misuse of Drugs Act
- Vandalism Act
- Miscellaneous Offences (Public Order and Nuisance) Act
- Criminal Procedure Code
- Evidence Act
- Administration of Justice (Protection) Act

== Criminal justice system ==
=== Criminal justice model ===
Former Chief Justice of Singapore Chan Sek Keong has described Singapore's criminal justice system as emphasising the control of crime over strict adherence to due process.

=== Punishment ===
Both capital punishment and corporal punishment, in the form of caning, are legal in Singapore. Certain offences impose a mandatory death penalty on individuals, with judges having no discretion in sentencing. This differs from, for example, the United States, where mandatory death sentences are unconstitutional. Where judges have discretion in sentencing the death penalty for murder, the test is whether "the actions of the offender outraged the feelings of the community," considering the offender's viciousness, disregard for human life, age, and personal characteristics.

=== Aims of punishment ===
The primary aim of criminal sentencing in Singapore is to punish and deter crimes.

=== Court process ===
The Attorney-General of Singapore is also the public prosecutor. Deputy public prosecutors and Attorney-General Chambers staff act for the attorney-general. As the public prosecutor, the Attorney-General has prosecutorial discretion and may initiate, conduct or cease any criminal proceeding. The prosecution typically bears the burden of proof and is required to prove its case beyond a reasonable doubt.

In general, an accused person is usually first charged with a higher offence than what may be established on the facts of the case. The accused may plea guilty or claim trial at the first mention in the state courts. Defence counsel for the accused can also make written representations without prejudice legally to the prosecuting authority, whereupon the prosecution may consent to amend the charge with a lesser relevant offence, a process known as the plea bargain.

Testifying witnesses are not required to be given an oath or otherwise instructed to tell the truth. Instead, the Oaths and Declarations Act "gives the judge the prerogative whether to caution a witness ["to speak the truth"] or not."

== Criminal jurisprudence ==
=== Actus reus ===
Establishing actus reus in Singaporean criminal jurisprudence follows English precedent such as R v Miller and R v Instan. Actus reus must correspond with mens rea for an offence to be made out. A single mens rea may correspond with a series of separate acts that form part of the actus reus of an offence, such as when a person an accused stabs a victim and leaves him for dead but where the victim dies of exposure.

==== Abetment ====
Three forms of abetment are recognised in Singapore law: instigation, conspiracy, and aiding. Instigation requires the support or encouragement of a crime. Where an individual intentionally does not interfere with another's offence, and such omission breaches a legal obligation, their omission may be regarded as abetment by aiding.

Where an individual forces another to commit a crime, and is the essential cause of the actus reus, then that individual does not merely abet the crime but can be regarded as committing the actus reus himself.

==== Attempts ====
Attempting to commit a crime, but failing to do so, is an offence. The test for determining whether an act is a criminal attempt comprises two parts. First, the accused must have had the intention to commit a crime. Second, the accused must have acted in a way that furthers his intention to commit the crime.

==== Common intention ====
Section 34 of the Penal Code states that "when a criminal act is done by several persons, in furtherance of the common intention of all, each of such persons is liable for that act in the same manner as if the act were done by him alone."

When multiple persons each commit the same offending act, they are liable for that specific offence. In the case of Asogan Ramesh, three men attacked another man, resulting in the victim's death. Two assailants stabbed the deceased repeatedly, whilst the other man threw a chair over the deceased head, causing instant death. All three men were convicted of murder and sentenced to death.

When multiple persons commit a certain offence, and one such offender commits a collateral offence, all secondary offenders may be regarded as having committed the collateral offence, provided that they intended for the collateral offence to have occurred. In other words, so long as the secondary offenders have mens rea, they need not have committed an actus reus to be found guilty.

If multiple individuals have a common intention in the committing of a crime, the mens rea element of all individuals can be made out.

=== Mens rea ===
Generally, the prosecutor has the burden of proving, beyond a reasonable doubt, that an individual had mens rea. The accused may rely upon a number of defences to prove an absence of mens rea. When a defence is relied upon, the factual burden shifts from the prosecutor to the accused to prove, on the balance of probabilities, the lack of mens rea.

For drug trafficking offences, individuals found in possession of a certain quantity of drugs are presumed to be guilty of the offence and having to prove, on the balance of probabilities, that they did not have mens rea. It is sufficient for an accused to prove that he merely did not know that the contents that he trafficked were controlled drugs. However, when the prosecution argues that an accused was wilfully blind, the burden remains on the prosecution.

The standard of criminal negligence is the same as that of civil negligence in Singapore law, including for professional negligence. Professionals who fail to meet the tortious Bolam standard can as criminally negligent as well. The rule in Nettleship v Weston, that inexperience is not considered in negligence, has been affirmed in Singaporean criminal law. Notwithstanding, there is no proximate cause requirement in criminal negligence; the accused need only have substantially contributed to the harm incurred. Whereas negligence only requires individuals to fail to fulfil a duty of care, rashness additionally requires that an act be committed with the knowledge that it would fail, or risk failing, to meet that duty of care.

Wilful blindness is a way by which mens rea may be found in the absence of actual knowledge. It requires: a clear and grounded suspicion; reasonable means of inquiry of finding out; and a deliberate refusal to pursue such means.

=== Defences ===
A number of general defences exist in Singaporean criminal jurisprudence, such as unsoundness of mind, automatism, and mistake. Unlike in some jurisdictions, the burden of proof of establishing defences lies upon the accused.

==== Intoxication ====
Intoxication is described as a defence in the penal code under specific circumstances. Andrew Simester has described the intoxication subsections in the penal code as largely not providing for a defence but a means by which intoxicated persons can be prosecuted without having to establish mens rea. He interprets s 85(1) as containing a legal fiction which regards an accused, who has no mens rea owing to intoxication, as having mens rea that allows for criminal conviction. Simester regards true defences provided under s 85(2) as "likely to be rare in the extreme" and "those where the intoxication triggers a condition analogous to insanity".

==== Unsoundness of mind ====
The finding of the defence of unsoundness of mind is a legal one and not a medical one. The fact that an accused had a mental disorder, or had a low intelligence, does not in itself disprove guilt. Rather, the court must make a factual finding as to whether the mental impairment had deprived the accused of control over his actions. The fact that an accused could clearly remember committing a crime may suggest that an offence was not done in insanity.

==== Crime-specific defences ====
Diminished responsibility, provocation, exceeding private defence and sudden fight are partial defences that can reduce a conviction of murder to that of culpable homicide.

Diminished responsibility, as in English law, requires three criteria to be met: (i) an abnormality of mind; (ii) that the abnormality was naturally caused, rather than being voluntarily induced via substance use; and (iii) that the abnormality substantially impaired an individual's responsibility. The first and third criteria are legal determinations, whereas the second criteria is determined by medical experts; it is not merely sufficient that an individual has a mental disorder, but that the mental disorder at the time of the offence had a material influence on the individual. On deciding the third criteria, judges consider an accused's conduct in determining whether they had difficulty or inability in controlling themselves. The ability to make decisions to avoid getting caught, or to continue a criminal activity, are factors that may suggest a lack of substantial impairment.

The provocation defence has subjective and objective limbs. The subjective limb requires the accused to have actually lost control as a result of the provocation; the objective limb in turn considers whether an ordinary person with the same sex and age as the accused would lose control if they had experienced the "grave and sudden" nature of the provocation. In considering the gravity of the provocation, the characteristics of the accused may be regarded. An accused's relationships and emotional state may be considered, but factors such as temper may not.

The sudden fight defence has three statutory requirements. First, there must have actually been a sudden fight that arose from the heat of the passion of a quarrel. Such fight must involve mutual physical blows and provocation and cannot merely be a verbal quarrel. Second, there must not have been premeditation. Third, the accused must not have taken undue advantage of the victim or acted in a cruel manner. Undue advantage presents itself when the accused has a physical advantage over the victim.

== Significant offences ==
=== Culpable homicide ===
Culpable homicide refers to acts that cause death under the penal code. Murder is an example of culpable homicide.

=== Murder ===
Under section 300 of the penal code, murder is a form of culpable homicide that satisfies additional requirements alongside the culpable homicide offence elements. Murder attracts a more serious form of punishment than culpable homicide, with section 300(a) attracting the mandatory death penalty.

Murder offences under section 300
Subsection	Requirements
a	Intention to cause death
b	Intention to cause bodily injury, knowing that the injury would likely cause death
c	Intention to cause bodily injury that would ordinarily cause death
d	Knowledge that the act committed is so dangerous that it would probably cause death

Under subsection 300(a), an intention to cause death need not be pre-meditated and can arise at the spur of the moment, so long as there was an actual intention to kill. Nonetheless, it cannot be presumed that an individual intended to kill or knew that their actions would result in death. Neither does the mere fact that it would be out of the ordinary for an individual to kill in itself disprove intention.

Intention may be inferred from the severity of the actus reus. The actions of an accused after a killing occurred may also indicate the presence of intention. An accused's attempts at concealing the deceased's body, rather than seeking medical attention, may indicate that they intended for the victim to die. Alternatively, an accused's lack of knowledge that the victim had actually died may indicate a lack of intention to kill but instead merely injure.

For subsection 300(c) murder to be made out, four requirements must be met: the presence of bodily injury; the nature of such bodily injury causing death; that the injury would objectively, ordinarily cause death; and that the accused subjectively intended to cause the injury. Where an accused knows that their actions would result in injury but does not intend the specific injury inflicted, they are not guilty for 300(c) murder but culpable homicide. However, where the accused intends to cause the very injuries they did, but is unaware that those injuries would ordinarily cause death, he is still liable for 300(c) murder.

=== Drug trafficking ===
Narcotics laws established by the Misuse of Drugs Act are strict. Anyone caught with more than a certain quantity of heroin, cocaine, morphine, methamphetamine, or cannabis are presumed to be trafficking drugs, and face mandatory capital punishment.

There are two exceptions in which a convicted trafficker may have his death sentence reduced to life imprisonment, with both exceptions requiring the trafficker to be only a mule. Distributors and high-ranking criminals are not eligible for the exceptions, as they are regarded as more blameworthy for offences. The first exception applies where the public prosecutor issues a certificate stating that the trafficker has substantially cooperated with the state. The first exception is designed to allow the public prosecutor, rather than the judiciary, to determine whether the death penalty is imposed, owing to the prosecutor's resources and ability to conduct proceedings behind closed doors. The second exception applies where the trafficker suffered an abnormality of mind that substantially impaired his decision-making ability.

Between 1991 and 2004, 400 people were hanged in Singapore, mostly for drug trafficking, one of the highest per-capita execution rates in the world.

== See also ==
- Caning in Singapore
- Life imprisonment in Singapore
- Capital punishment in Singapore
- Criminal Law (Temporary Provisions) Act (Singapore)
- Law of Singapore

=== Selected Singapore criminal statutes ===
- Misuse of Drugs Act (Singapore)
- Penal Code (Singapore)
- Sedition Act (Singapore)
- Vandalism Act (Singapore)
