= Vandalism Act =

Statute of the Parliament of Singapore

Vandalism Act 1966
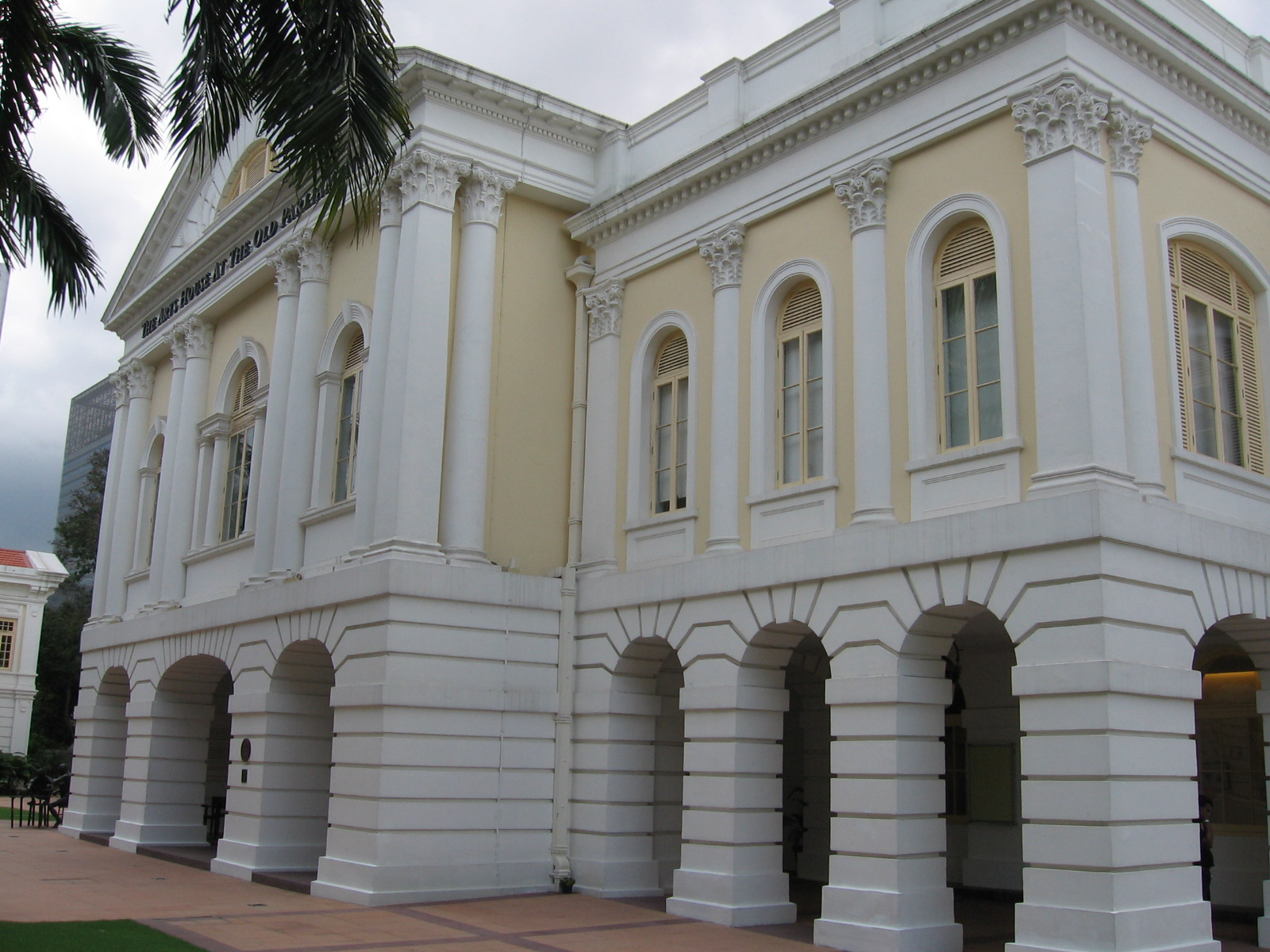
- Old Parliament House, photographed in January 2006

Parliament of Singapore
- Long title: An Act to provide for exemplary punishment for acts of vandalism and to make special provisions in regard to certain offences relating to public property.
- Citation: Act 38 of 1966
- Enacted by: Parliament of Singapore
- Enacted: 26 August 1966
- Assented to: 31 August 1966
- Commenced: 16 September 1966

Legislative history
- Bill title: Punishment for Vandalism Bill
- Bill citation: Bill No. 36/66
- Introduced by: Wee Toon Boon (Minister of State for Defence)
- Introduced: 17 August 1966
- First reading: 17 August 1966
- Second reading: 26 August 1966
- Third reading: 26 August 1966

The Vandalism Act 1966 is a statute of the Parliament of Singapore that criminalises a number of different acts done in relation to public and private property, namely, stealing, destroying or damaging public property; and, without the property owner's written consent, writing, drawing, painting, marking or inscribing on property; affixing posters, placards, etc., to the property; and suspending or displaying on or from the property any flag, banner, etc.

In addition to a fine or jail term, the Act imposes mandatory corporal punishment of between three and eight strokes of the cane for second or subsequent convictions. Caning is also imposed for first convictions for defacing property using an indelible substance; and stealing, destroying or damaging public property. The Children and Young Persons Act ("CYPA") states that the High Court may impose a caning penalty on juvenile offenders as well. In a 1968 case, the High Court held that despite the wording of this provision, a subordinate court may sentence juveniles to caning under the Vandalism Act as that Act takes precedence over the CYPA.

The 1994 conviction of 18-year-old American citizen Michael P. Fay for vandalizing cars using spray paint, and the sentence of six strokes of the cane imposed on him, provoked much controversy with both condemnation and support from Americans. Following a request by US President Bill Clinton for clemency, President Ong Teng Cheong commuted Fay's caning sentence from six to four strokes. In 2010, a Swiss national, Oliver Fricker, pleaded guilty to charges of trespassing into a Mass Rapid Transit depot and spray-painting a train with an accomplice, and was sentenced to five months' jail and three strokes of the cane. On appeal, the High Court increased his total jail term to seven months, leaving the caning sentence unchanged.

== History ==
Vandalism was originally prohibited by the Minor Offences Act, which made it punishable by a fine of up to S$50 and/or a week in jail. The Vandalism Act was introduced into Parliament as the Punishment for Vandalism Bill on 17 August 1966. At the second reading of the bill on 26 August, its introducer, the Minister of State for Defence Wee Toon Boon, said that Members of Parliament were aware of the reasons for the bill

... for we have witnessed for some time the sorry spectacle of people of ill-will smearing and defacing our fair city. The writing of slogans, drawing of pictures, painting and marking or inscribing on public and private property has been rampant. Indeed, even the sides of drains have been used by anti-social and anti-national elements in the name of democracy, but their crude artistic feats in effect destroy and deface what democracy has built for the people. Singapore has also recently witnessed acts of vandalism like the theft of insulating oil from electrical power stations and the wanton damage to fountains. Damaging or destroying public property which is provided for the benefit of the people must be considered extremely serious, for it is the people themselves who ultimately pay for the services and amenities provided by the Government. However, there are, regrettably, certain irresponsible persons in the community who find a cruel joy in destroying and damaging public property. In the interests of the nation, it is therefore necessary that the minority who cause damage should be dealt with severely.

Taking part in the Parliamentary debate, the Prime Minister Lee Kuan Yew commented that the bill, which sought to impose a mandatory caning sentence on persons convicted for the first time of vandalism with an indelible substance, was a "departure from what is normal criminal law legislation". However, the punishment was necessary because

... we have a society which, unfortunately, I think, understands only two things – the incentive and the deterrent. We intend to use both, the carrot and the stick. ... [A] fine will not deter the type of criminal we are facing here. He is quite prepared to go to gaol, having defaced public buildings with red paint. Flaunting the values of his ideology, he is quite prepared to make a martyr of himself and go to gaol. He will not pay the fine and make a demonstration of his martyrdom. But if he knows he is going to get three of the best, I think he will lose a great deal of enthusiasm, because there is little glory attached to the rather humiliating experience of having to be caned.

The bill was committed to a Committee of the whole House, read a third time and passed the same day. It was assented to by the President of Singapore on 31 August, and came into force on 16 September 1966. As of 2010, the Act had not been amended significantly since it was enacted.

Jothie Rajah of the American Bar Foundation has argued that the actual target of the law was activists from the Barisan Sosialis, an opposition party harshly suppressed at the time, which used posters and graffiti to spread its message. In the 1994 case Fay Michael Peter v. Public Prosecutor, the appellant's counsel made a similar argument, submitting briefly before the High Court that the original legislative intent behind the imposition of a caning penalty was to suppress violent political elements which existed in Singapore in the 1960s which had, among other things, inscribed anti-national slogans in public places. However, Chief Justice Yong Pung How took the view that it was "too simplistic" to claim that the Act was aimed mainly at punishing riotous anti-national elements: "That may have been one of the more urgent objectives at the time the Act was enacted in 1966 but a reading of the relevant Parliamentary Debates shows that the Legislature was simultaneously concerned with containing anti-social acts of hooliganism."

In 2025, the Ministry of Home Affairs submitted the Criminal Law (Miscellaneous Amendments) Bill to Parliament. If enacted, the bill would abolish mandatory caning for acts of vandalism. According to the Ministry, mandatory caning is abolished because it considers alternative forms of punishment are adequate.

== Provisions ==
=== Definition of act of vandalism ===
Section 2 of the Vandalism Act defines an act of vandalism as:

(a) without the written authority of an authorised officer or representative of the Government or of the government of any Commonwealth or foreign country or of any statutory body or authority or of any armed force lawfully present in Singapore in the case of public property, or without the written consent of the owner or occupier in the case of private property —

(i) writing, drawing, painting, marking or inscribing on any public property or private property any word, slogan, caricature, drawing, mark, symbol or other thing;
(ii) affixing, posting up or displaying on any public property or private property any poster, placard, advertisement, bill, notice, paper or other document; or
(iii) hanging, suspending, hoisting, affixing or displaying on or from any public property or private property any flag, bunting, standard, banner or the like with any word, slogan, caricature, drawing, mark, symbol or other thing; or

(b) stealing, destroying or damaging any public property.

Public property means movable or immovable property owned by the Government of Singapore, the government of any Commonwealth or foreign country, any statutory body or authority, or any armed force lawfully present in Singapore.

=== Offences and penalties ===
Notwithstanding the provisions of any other written law, it is an offence under the Act to commit any act of vandalism, attempt to do any such act, or cause any such act to be done. Upon conviction, the penalty is a fine not exceeding S$2,000 or imprisonment not exceeding three years, and also corporal punishment of not less than three strokes and not more than eight strokes of the cane. However, caning will not be imposed on a first conviction if the act carried out falls within section 2(a)(i) and "the writing, drawing, mark or inscription is done with pencil, crayon, chalk or other delible substance or thing and not with paint, tar or other indelible substance or thing", or within sections 2(a)(ii) or (iii).

In the Fay Michael Peter case, the appellant Michael P. Fay had earlier pleaded guilty before a district judge to two charges of vandalism by spraying red paint on two cars. Twenty other charges were taken into consideration for sentencing purposes, 16 of them charges of vandalism committed with paint. On appeal to the High Court, Fay's counsel argued that the Act, properly interpreted, showed that Parliament had not intended to punish all acts of vandalism using paint with caning, and that in each case the court had to determine if the paint used was easily removable or not before deciding whether to sentence the defendant to caning. Chief Justice Yong Pung How rejected this submission on the ground that there was no reason to deviate from the plain meaning of the words in the Act. There was no indication in the Act of any Parliamentary intention to subject all acts of vandalism committed with paint to an ad hoc test of indelibility. He said:

Conversely, to compel the courts to admit in every vandalism case involving paint, a plethora of evidence on the delibility or otherwise of the paint used in the offence, seemed to me to be throwing the floodgates open to endless and increasingly convoluted arguments about the exact scientific degree of ease with which any particular type of paint is removed: it is the sort of absurdity virtually guaranteed to thwart the legislative intent, as stated in the preamble, of providing for "exemplary punishment for acts of vandalism".

The punishment imposed by the Act is expressly made subject to sections 325(1) and 330(1) of the Criminal Procedure Code, which prohibit a caning sentence from being imposed on women, men considered by the court to be more than 50 years old, and men sentenced to death. Caning sentences may be imposed on juveniles above the age of seven years and under 16 years, as the Children and Young Persons Act specifically states that, notwithstanding the provisions of any other written law, no child or young person shall be sentenced by any court other than the High Court to corporal punishment. Despite the express words reserving to the High Court the power to impose the penalty, the Court has held that caning may be imposed on a child or young person by a subordinate court as the Vandalism Act takes precedence over the Children and Young Persons Act.

=== Other provisions ===
Offences under the Act are arrestable and non-bailable. Thus, a person committing such an offence may be arrested without a warrant by a police officer and, in some circumstances, a private person.

The Act also provides that in the case of a prosecution for dishonestly receiving stolen property under section 411 of the Penal Code, where the stolen property is public property, it shall be presumed unless the defendant is able to prove otherwise that the person who received or retained the property knew or had reason to believe that the property was stolen public property, and also that he or she received or retained it dishonestly.

== Notable cases ==
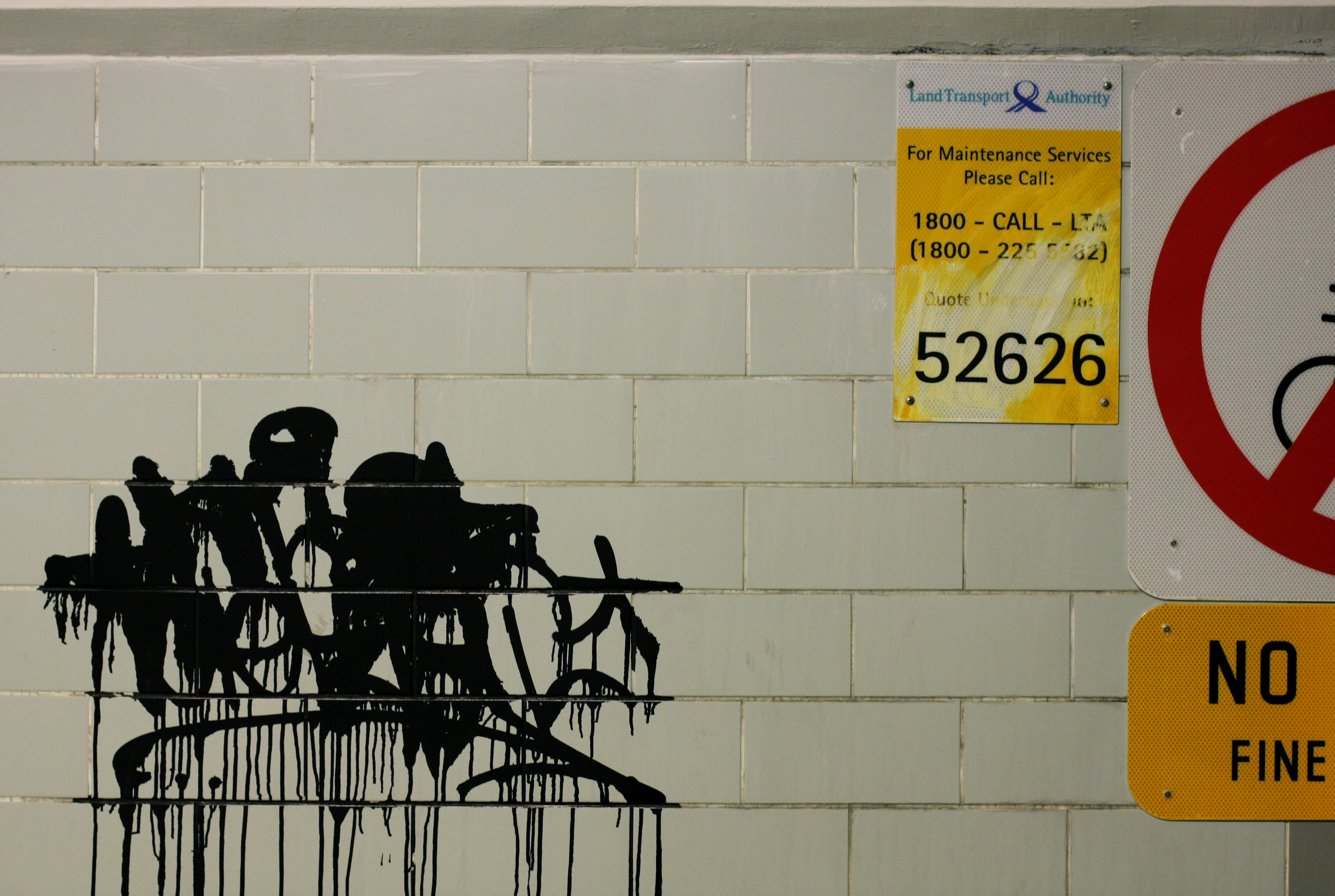
Graffiti in a pedestrian underpass in the Central Area

=== Michael Fay (1994) ===
On 3 March 1994, Michael P. Fay, an 18-year-old American citizen, pleaded guilty to two charges of vandalizing 18 cars by spray-painting them, damaging them using hot tar, paint remover, and hatchets, pelting eggs at them, slashing the tires of taxis, scratching and denting cars, and kicking the door of a car and bashing it with a brick between 17 and 18 September 1993 together with three accomplices. One of the cars belonged to Judicial Commissioner Amarjeet Singh. Fay was sentenced by a District Court to two months' imprisonment and three strokes of the cane on each charge. The High Court later rejected an appeal against the sentence. The caning sentence provoked much controversy in the United States, and was condemned as cruel and excessive for a non-violent offence. On the other hand, a significant number of Americans supported the penalty, reasoning that American citizens who travelled abroad had to respect the laws of the countries that they visited, and that the United States was not tough enough on its own juvenile offenders. Following a request by US President Bill Clinton for clemency, President Ong Teng Cheong commuted Fay's caning from six to four strokes. The sentence was carried out on 5 May 1994.

=== SMRT train at Changi Depot (2010) ===
A 32-year-old Swiss national, Oliver Fricker, was charged in court on 5 June 2010 for having allegedly trespassed into the SMRT Corporation's Changi Depot, a protected place, and spraypainted graffiti on a Mass Rapid Transit Kawasaki Heavy Industries C151 train between the night of 16 May and the early hours of 17 May. The graffiti consisted of the words "McKoy Banos", said to be the signature of two anonymous "artists" who have tagged trains around the world. A Briton, Dane Alexander Lloyd, was also named on the charge sheet, but he was not present in court and was believed to have left Singapore for Hong Kong. A warrant of arrest for Lloyd has been issued by a court, and the authorities will seek to extradite him to stand trial in Singapore if there is an extradition treaty between Singapore and the country where he is found. On 25 June, Fricker pleaded guilty to the charges against him and was sentenced to two months' jail for trespass and three months' jail and three strokes of the cane for vandalism, the jail terms to run consecutively. Both Fricker and the prosecution appealed to the High Court against the trespass sentence. On 18 August, Justice V.K. Rajah increased the sentence to four months, calling the original sentence "manifestly inadequate", thus requiring Fricker to serve seven months' jail altogether. He also commented that "[w]hile some might regard graffiti as a stimulating and liberating activity that adds colour, spice and variety to a staid environment", such actions were "offensive to the sensibilities of the general public".

=== Rooftop of Block 85A Toa Payoh Lorong (2014) ===
Five youths were charged with vandalism for spray painting graffiti on a large wall panel on the top of the Block 85A Toa Payoh Lorong with expletives directed against the ruling party. The youths had stolen spray paint cans from a parked truck and entered the rooftop of the HDB block to carry out the act. A contractor and other HDB residents complained. All five were given probation sentences and were electronically tagged.

=== SMRT train at Bishan Depot (2014) ===
On 5 March 2015, two Germans, Andreas Von Knorre and Elton Hinz, were each sentenced to nine months' imprisonment and three strokes of the cane for breaking into SMRT's Bishan Depot in November 2014 and spraypainting a C151 train cabin.

== See also ==
- Caning in Singapore
- Crime in Singapore
- Criminal law of Singapore
