= Penal Code (Singapore) =

Criminal code of Singapore

Penal Code 1871

Legislative Council of the Straits Settlements
- Long title: An Act to consolidate the law relating to criminal offences.
- Citation: Ordinance No. 4 of 1871 (Straits Settlements); now Penal Code 1871 (2020 Revised Edition)
- Enacted by: Legislative Council of the Straits Settlements
- Commenced: 16 September 1872

Legislative history
- First reading: 19 July 1871
- Second reading: 8 August 1871
- Third reading: 9 August 1871

Amended by
- Penal Code (Amendment) Act 2007 (No. 51 of 2007); Penal Code (Amendment) Act 2012 (No. 32 of 2012); Criminal Law Reform Act 2019 (No. 15 of 2019)
- Status: In force

The Penal Code 1871 sets out general principles of the criminal law of Singapore, as well as the elements and penalties of general criminal offences such as assault, criminal intimidation, mischief, grievous hurt, theft, extortion, sex crimes and cheating. The Penal Code does not define and list exhaustively all the criminal offences applicable in Singapore – a large number of these are created by other statutes such as the Arms Offences Act, Kidnapping Act, Misuse of Drugs Act and Vandalism Act.

== History ==
For most of the 19th century the criminal law which applied in the Straits Settlements (comprising Prince of Wales' Island (Penang), Singapore and Malacca) was that of the United Kingdom, insofar as local circumstances permitted. There was little doubt that at the time English common law crimes were recognized in these territories. However, due to problems such as doubts as to the applicability of Indian Acts, in 1871 the Straits Settlements Penal Code 1871 was enacted. It came into operation on 16 September 1872. The Code was practically a re-enactment of the Indian Penal Code.

Over the years, the Penal Code has been amended several times.

== Provisions ==
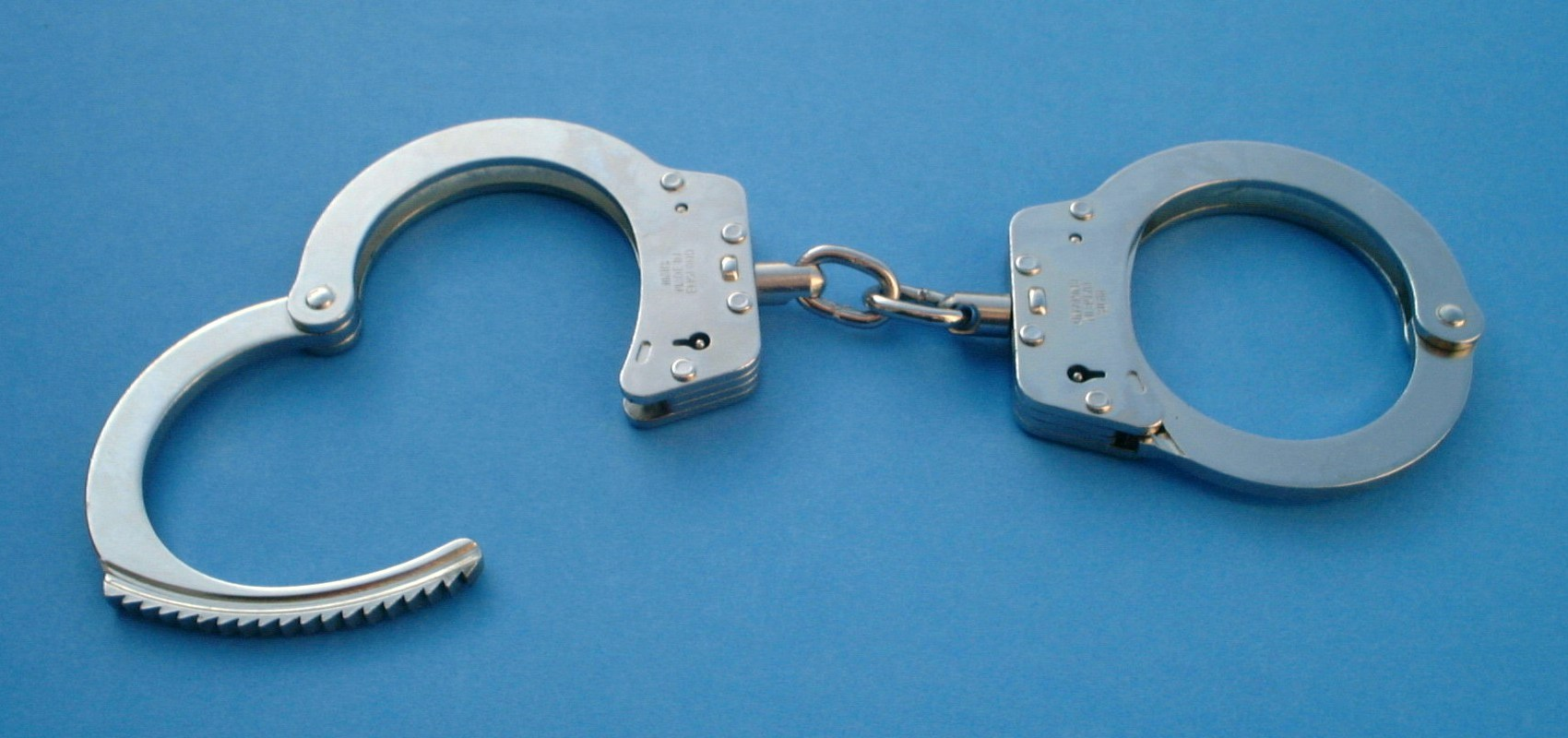

The Penal Code has over 500 sections, and is divided into 24 chapters.

The Penal Code defines the elements of each offence and prescribes the maximum, and occasionally also the minimum, penalties for it. The basic form of an offence (commonly referred to as the 'simple offence' or, using Latin terminology, as the 'offence simpliciter') has the lowest penalties. More serious forms of the offence are defined as separate offences and attract stiffer penalties. For instance, theft is defined in section 378 of the Code, and section 379 makes simple theft an offence punishable with imprisonment of up to three years or with fine or both. Section 379A punishes the theft of a motor vehicle or any component part of a motor vehicle with imprisonment of not less than one year and not more than seven years and a fine.

== Charge in court ==
The Attorney-General of Singapore's role as the Public Prosecutor is done by the AGC's Crime Division.

Prosecutorial discretion grants AGC the power to institute, conduct or discontinue any prosecution at his discretion.

It is the role of the prosecution to prove the case against the accused to an evidentiary standard of beyond reasonable doubt.

In general, an accused offender is usually first charged with an appropriate offence that can be established on the prima facie facts of the case. Upon engaging a lawyer (defence counsel), the defence counsel will make written representations without prejudice legally to the prosecuting authority, who may then review, exercise prosecutorial discretion, and consent to amend the charge with lesser relevant offence, a process known as plea bargaining.

== Reform ==
=== 2007 Penal Code amendments ===
In 2006, the Ministry of Home Affairs (MHA), in consultation with the Attorney-General's Chambers, Ministry of Law and other agencies, conducted an extensive review of the Penal Code in order to bring it "up to date, and make it more effective in maintaining a safe and secure society in today's context". Between 9 November and 9 December 2006, the MHA held a public consultation on proposed changes to the Code.

Among the proposed amendments are the ones set out below.

=== Expansion and modification of the scope of existing offences ===
- Offences committed via electronic medium – The scope of certain sections will be expanded to cover offences committed via an electronic medium, including s. 292 (sale of obscene books. etc.), s. 298 (uttering words, etc., with deliberate intent to wound the religious feelings of any person), s. 499 (defamation) and s. 505 (statements conducing to public mischief).
- Cheating – Section 415, which defines the offence of cheating, will be amended to make clear that (a) the offence is committed whether or not deception was the sole or main inducement; (b) it extends to cover damage or harm to any person instead of only to the person deceived; and (c) any representation made through an agent will be treated as having been made by the person himself or herself.
- Unlawful assembly – Section 141 will be amended so that an unlawful assembly is an assembly of five or more people whose common object is to commit any offence, and not just an offence relating to public tranquillity.
- New offence of uttering words, etc., with deliberate intent to wound racial feelings – Section 298, which creates the offence of uttering words, etc., with deliberate intent to wound the religious feelings of any person, will be expanded to cover the wounding of racial feelings as well. This is to provide the Public Prosecutor with the option of charging offenders under the Penal Code instead of only the Sedition Act.
- Decriminalization of anal and oral sex in certain circumstances; bestiality – Section 377 (carnal intercourse against the order of nature) will be repealed and re-enacted in a modified form, such that anal and oral sex, if done in private between a consulting heterosexual couple aged 16 years old and above, will no longer be criminal offences. The offence of bestiality, also currently covered by s. 377, will be expanded to cover the scenario where a person is compelled by another person to perform bestiality without his or her consent. The new s. 377 will be replaced by omitting "unnatural sex" to be replaced by "Sex with a corpse" or dead bodies which will be outlawed.
- Incest – The offence of incest created by ss. 376A, 376B and 376C will be expanded to (a) cover other sexual acts involving penetration, in addition to sexual intercourse; (b) cover penetrative sexual acts between a grandmother and her grandson; and (c) provide that a boy under 16 years cannot be prosecuted for incest (as currently provided for females under 16 years) as they are not mature enough to make an informed decision.
- Rape – The offence of rape (s. 375) will be amended to cover persons who have undergone sex reassignment surgery, and to define sexual intercourse to include acts involving a surgically constructed penis or vagina that is integrated into the body of a person.
- Enhanced penalties for outraging modesty of minor under 14 years – The penalties for outraging the modesty of a minor under 14 years under s. 354 will be enhanced.
- Increase in age restriction for selling, etc., obscene object to minor – The age restriction under s. 293, which makes it an offence for any person to sell, hire, distribute, exhibit or circulate any obscene object to any person under 20 years, will be increased to 21 years in line with the Restricted 21 (R21) classification for films.

== See also ==
- Caning in Singapore
- Life imprisonment in Singapore
- Capital punishment in Singapore
- Criminal law of Singapore
- Law of Singapore
- LGBT rights in Singapore
