= Misuse of Drugs Act (Singapore) =

Law of Singapore

Misuse of Drugs Act 1973
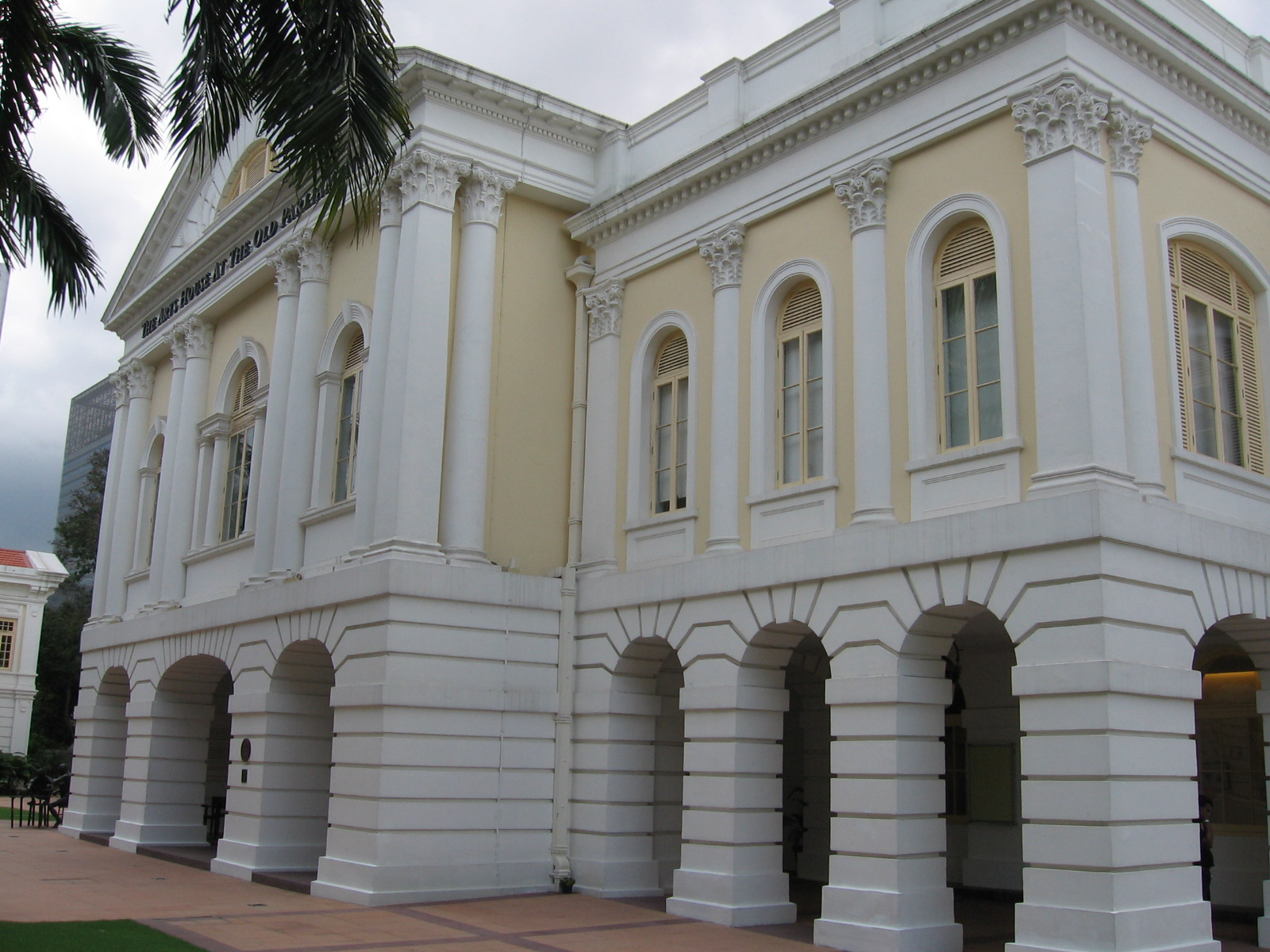
- Old Parliament House

Parliament of Singapore
- Long title: An Act for the control of dangerous or otherwise harmful drugs and substances and for purposes connected therewith.
- Citation: No. 5 of 1973
- Enacted by: Parliament of Singapore
- Enacted: 16 February 1973
- Assented to: 7 July 1973
- Commenced: 7 July 1973

Legislative history
- Bill title: Misuse of Drugs Bill
- Bill citation: Bill No. 46/72
- Introduced by: Chua Sian Chin (Minister for Health and Home Affairs)
- Introduced: 25 November 1972
- First reading: 22 November 1972
- Second reading: 16 February 1973
- Third reading: 16 February 1973

Related legislation
- Dangerous Drugs Act 1951; Drugs (Prevention of Misuse) Act 1969
- Status: Amended

The Misuse of Drugs Act 1973 is a statute of the Parliament of Singapore that enables authorities to prosecute offenders for crimes involving illegal drugs. The law is designed specifically to grant the Government of Singapore, through its agencies such as the Central Narcotics Bureau, enforcement powers to combat offences such as the trafficking, importation or exportation, possession, and consumption of controlled drugs.

== Background ==
Despite its close proximity to the major drug producing areas of the Golden Triangle, Singapore in the late 1960s had relatively little hard drug use, with an estimated 8,000 local opium addicts out of a total population of just over 2 million. These regular users tended to be older Chinese Singaporean men, whose activities the authorities often turned a blind eye to due to the younger generation of Singaporeans not picking up the same habits. Methaqualone (Quaalude) pills were freely available and widely abused as a recreational drug, while cannabis smoking became more widespread as hippie culture became popular. However, in the early 1970s a sudden heroin epidemic swept through Singapore, addicting over 3% of the young male population within a couple of years, with virtually all of them "chasing the dragon" with low quality (less than 40% pure) Heroin Number 3.

As a small island country with no exportable natural resources, Singapore's economic model at the time was based on added-value activities (such as factory work or sea-bourne cargo logistics) from an industrious and efficient society, to which the possibility of a large percentage of the population becoming unproductive due to drug addiction posed an enormous economic threat. The Government of Singapore responded with a zero tolerance policy regarding the abuse of all types of drugs, aiming to rapidly contain the sudden heroin epidemic via new laws that proscribed harsh punishments for both traffickers (such as the death penalty) and consumers (including caning) alike.

"Once ensnared by drug dependence, they will no longer be productive digits contributing to our economy and social progress. They will not be able to carry on with their regular jobs. Usually for the young men, they will turn to all sorts of crimes and, for the girls, to prostitution to get money to buy their badly needed supply of drugs. Thus, as a developing country, our progress and very survival will be seriously threatened"

— Minister for Home Affairs Chua Sian Chin addressing Parliament in 1975 regarding the threat heroin addiction posed to Singapore as a country

== Overview ==
The Misuse of Drugs Act 1973 classifies narcotic substances into three categories: Classes A, B, and C. Section 44 provides that "The Minister may, by an order published in the Gazette" add, remove, or transfer drugs among the classes. The statute's penal provisions are severe by most nations' standards, providing for long terms of imprisonment, caning, and capital punishment.

The law creates a presumption of trafficking for certain threshold amounts, (e.g.) 30 grams of cannabis. It also creates a presumption that a person possesses drugs if he possesses the keys to a premises containing the drugs, and that "Any person found in or escaping from any place or premises which is proved or presumed to be used for the purpose of smoking or administering a controlled drug shall, until the contrary is proved, be presumed to have been smoking or administering a controlled drug in that place or premises." Thus, one runs the risk of arrest for drug use by simply being in the company of drug users.

The law also allows officers to search premises and individuals, without a search warrant, if he "reasonably suspects that there is to be found a controlled drug or article liable to seizure". Moreover, Section 31 allows officers to demand urinalysis of suspected drug offenders while section 8A prohibits any citizen or permanent resident of Singapore to use any prohibited drug outside of the country, and if found guilty to be punished as if they committed that act within the country.

== Thresholds ==
Section 17 of the Misuse of Drugs Act lists the amount of controlled drugs beyond which, the person who carries them shall be presumed to possess them for the purpose of drug trafficking unless proven otherwise:

Controlled Drug	Presumed trafficking	Death penalty or life imprisonment with min 15 strokes of the cane (eligible)
opium	100 grams (3.5 oz)	1,200 grams (42 oz)
morphine	3 grams (0.11 oz)	30 grams (1.1 oz)
diamorphine (heroin)	2 grams (0.071 oz)	15 grams (0.53 oz)
cannabis	15 grams (0.53 oz)	500 grams (18 oz)
cannabis mixture	30 grams (1.1 oz)	1,000 grams (35 oz)
cannabis resin	10 grams (0.35 oz)	200 grams (7.1 oz)
cocaine	3 grams (0.11 oz)	30 grams (1.1 oz)
methamphetamine	25 grams (0.88 oz)	250 grams (8.8 oz)
10 grams (0.35 oz) of any or any combination of the following: N, α-dimethyl-3,4-(methylenedioxy)phenethylamine (MDMA); α-methyl-3,4-(methylenedioxy)phenethylamine (MDA); N-ethyl-α-methyl-3,4-(methylenedioxy)phenethylamine (MDEA)

The possession, consumption, manufacturing, import, export, or trafficking of these and other controlled drugs in any amount is illegal. Persons caught with less than the Mandatory Death Penalty amounts of these controlled substances face penalties ranging from caning (up to 24 strokes) to life in prison. Pursuant to a law change in 2009, cannabis (marijuana) and marijuana mixtures (diluted with other substances) are treated the same under Singapore law—the presumed intent is trafficking.

== Schedule I – Controlled Drugs ==
=== Class A – Part I ===
Some examples include:

- Amphetamine
- Buprenorphine
- Cannabinol (and derivatives)
- Cannabis (marijuana)
- Cathinone and methcathinone
- Cocaine (in all forms, including coca leaf)
- Desomorphine
- Dimethyltryptamine (DMT)
- Ecgonine (any derivative of ecgonine which is convertible to ecgonine or to cocaine)
- Fentanyl (and all its analogues, i.e. alphamethylfentanyl (AMF; China White), alfentanil, sufentanil, carfentanil, etc.)
- GHB
- Lysergic acid diethylamide (LSD), and other lysergides
- MDMA (ecstasy)
- Mescaline
- Methamphetamine
- Methaqualone
- Morphine, heroin, methadone and oxycodone
- Nimetazepam
- Opium
- Psilocin and psilocybine (psilocybin mushrooms)
- Salvinorin A (salvia divinorum)
- Temazepam

=== Class B – Part II ===
Some examples include:

- Acetyldihydrocodeine
- Codeine
- Dextropropoxyphene
- Dihydrocodeine
- Ethylmorphine
- Methylphenidate (ritalin)
- Nicocodeine
- Phencyclidine (PCP)
- Pholcodine
- Zipeprol

=== Class C – Part III ===
- Benzphetamine
- Chlorphentermine
- Flunitrazepam (rohypnol)
- Mecloqualone
- Mephentermine
- Phendimetrazine
- Pipradrol
- Secobarbital
- Triazolam (halcion)
- Etomidate

=== Part IV ===
For the purposes of this Paragraph:

- cannabinol derivatives means the following substances, namely tetrahydro derivatives of cannabinol and their carboxylic acid derivatives, and 3-alkyl homologues of cannabinol or its tetrahydro derivatives;
- coca leaf means the leaf of any plant of the genus Erythroxylon from whose leaves cocaine can be extracted either directly or by chemical transformation;
- concentrate of opium poppy-straw means the material produced when poppy-straw has entered into a process for the concentration of its alkaloids;
- opium poppy means any plant from which morphine may be produced;
- preparation means a mixture, solid or liquid, containing a controlled drug;
- poppy-straw means all parts, except the seeds, of the opium poppy, after mowing.

== Schedule III ==
=== Controlled equipment, materials or substances useful for manufacturing controlled drugs ===
- Part I
  - 1-Phenyl-2-propanone also known as Phenylacetone
  - 3,4-methylenedioxyphenyl-2-propanone
  - Camazepam (may be used to manufacture temazepam) also known as (9-chloro-2-methyl-3-oxo-6-phenyl-2,5-diazabicyclo[5.4.0]undeca-5,8,10,12-tetraen-4-yl) N,N-dimethylcarbamate
  - Clonazepam also known as 6-(2-chlorophenyl)-9-nitro-2,5-diazabicyclo[5.4.0]undeca-5,8,10,12-tetraen-3-one
  - Diazepam (may be used to manufacture temazepam) also known as 7-chloro-1-methyl-5-phenyl-1,3-dihydro-2H-1,4-benzodiazepin-2-one
  - Ephedrine also known as (1R,2S)-2-(methylamino)-1-phenylpropan-1-ol
  - Ergometrine also known as Ergonovine or Ergobasine
  - Ergotamine also known as Ergotaman-3',6',18-trione, 12'-hydroxy-2'-methyl-5'-(phenylmethyl)-, (5'-alpha)- (9CI)
  - Estazolam (may be used to manufacture triazolam) also known as 8-Chloro-6-phenyl-4H-1,2,4-triazolo(4,3-a)-1,4-benzodiazepine
  - Isosafrole also known as 1,2-(Methylenedioxy)-4-propenylbenzene
  - Lorazepam (may be used to manufacture temazepam) also known as 9-chloro-6-(2-chlorophenyl)-4-hydroxy-2,5-diazabicyclo[5.4.0]undeca-5,8,10,12-tetraen-3-one
  - Lormetazepam (may be used to manufacture temazepam) also known as 9-chloro-6-(2-chlorophenyl)-4-hydroxy-2-methyl-2,5-diazabicyclo[5.4.0]undeca-5,8,10,12-tetraen-3-one
  - Lysergic acid also known as 9,10-didehydro-6-methylergoline-8-carboxylic acid
  - N-acetylanthranilic acid also known as N-Acetyl-o-aminobenzoic acid
  - Nitrazepam (may be used to manufacture flunitrazepam and nimetazepam) also known as 9-nitro-6-phenyl-2,5-diazabicyclo[5.4.0]undeca-5,8,10,12-tetraen-3-one
  - Oxazepam (may be used to manufacture temazepam) also known as 9-chloro-4-hydroxy-6-phenyl-2,5-diazabicyclo[5.4.0]undeca-5,8,10,12-tetraen-3-one
  - Piperonal also known as 3,4-(Methylenedioxy)benzaldehyde or Piperonylaldehyde
  - Prazepam (may be used to manufacture flutoprazepam) also known as 9-chloro-2-(cyclopropylmethyl)-6-phenyl-2,5-diazabicyclo[5.4.0]undeca-5,8,10,12-tetraen-3-one
  - Pseudoephedrine also known as β-Hydroxy-N-methylamphetamine
  - Safrole also known as 4-Allyl-1,2-methylenedioxybenzene
- Part II
  - Acetic anhydride also known as Acetic oxide
  - Acetone also known as 2-Propanone or Dimethyl ketone
  - Anthranilic acid also known as o-Aminobenzoic acid
  - Ethyl ether also known as Ether or Diethyl ether or Ethyl oxide or Diethyl oxide or Ethoxyethane or 1, 1'-Oxybisethane
  - Hydrochloric acid
  - Methyl ethyl ketone also known as 2-Butanone
  - Phenylacetic acid also known as Benzeneacetic acid or a-Toluic acid
  - Piperidine also known as Hexahydropyridine
  - Potassium permanganate
  - Sulphuric acid
  - Toluene also known as Methylbenzene or Phenylmethane

== See also ==
- Capital punishment in Singapore
- Capital punishment for drug trafficking
- Criminal law of Singapore
- Law of Singapore
- Ong Ah Chuan v. Public Prosecutor
- Cannabis in Singapore
- History of opium in Singapore
- Opium in Singapore
- United Nations Office on Drugs and Crime
- United Nations Commission on Narcotic Drugs
