= Cannabis in Singapore =

- Location of Singapore (red)
- Medicinal: Illegal
- Recreational: Illegal

Cannabis is currently illegal in Singapore for recreational purposes. Possession or consumption can result in a maximum of 10 years in prison, with a possible fine of $20,000, as well as caning, under the Misuse of Drugs Act. Trafficking, import or export of more than 500 grams may result in the death penalty. Medical cannabis is also not permitted, with very limited exceptions for cannabidiol (CBD) pharmaceuticals.

== History ==
Cannabis was likely introduced to Singapore by immigrant laborers from South Asia, who often used cannabis in their homelands. This origin is witnessed by the use of the Indian term ganja to label cannabis in Singapore, even among non-Indians. Cannabis was banned in Singapore in 1870, during the British colonial period under the Straits Settlements.

== Government view ==
The government has argued that its strict laws on drugs, which includes cannabis, is due to Singapore's proximity to the Golden Triangle, a popular worldwide transit point and market for drug trafficking.

In 2016, a Straits Times article reported that there were 252 new drug cases by the National Addictions Management Service in the previous year involving people aged below 30, compared with 136 in 2014, further citing that such "cases of young people influenced by growing acceptance of drug overseas [is] a worrying trend." Singaporean politician Christopher de Souza, who chairs the Government Parliamentary Committee for Home Affairs and Law later stated that "to decriminalize the recreational consumption of cannabis is a foolish proposal. It entrenches a higher tolerance for drugs in community."

== Medical cannabis ==
Medical cannabis is generally not permitted. However, a limited number of patients have been prescribed cannabinoid pharmaceuticals as a drug of last resort after all other treatment options have been exhausted.

The Singapore's National Research Foundation (NRF) announced on January 10, 2018 that it would develop synthetic medicinal cannabinoids, or chemical compounds found in the marijuana plant, to eventually help treat diseases such as Alzheimer's and Parkinson's. Part of a broader S$25 million ($19 million) investment by the body into synthetic biology, the initiative is intended to boost Singapore's push to develop a “bio-based economy,” and grow new industries and create jobs in a sustainable way.

As of 2021, two people with treatment-resistant epilepsy have been granted permission to use medicinal cannabis. The permission is for a cannabinoid pharmaceutical also known as Epidiolex.

== Opinion polling ==
| Date(s) conducted | Polling organisation/client | Medical and recreational legalisation | Medical legalisation | Status Quo | Ref |
|---|---|---|---|---|---|
| September 2022 | Milieu/The Sunday Times | 12% | 53% (Note: 65% when the 12% is added who are for both medical and recreational cannabis.) | 35% | |

In 2022, a survey by the local newspaper The Sunday Times as well as consumer research company Milieu found that 53% of Singaporeans believe that the country should explore legalising cannabis for medical purposes. 35% were against both medical and recreational cannabis, and 12% were for the legalisation of both medical and recreational cannabis, totaling 65% being for medical legalisation.
