= Caning of Michael Fay =

1993–1994 Singaporean judicial sentence of an American teenager

In 1994, the District Court in Singapore sentenced an American teenager, Michael Peter Fay, to be lashed six times with a cane for violating the Vandalism Act. This caused a temporary strain in relations between Singapore and the United States.

Fay was arrested for stealing road signs and vandalising 18 cars over a ten-day period in September 1993. He pled guilty, but later said that he was advised that such a plea would preclude caning, his confession was false, he had never vandalized any cars and that the only crime he committed was stealing road signs. Although caning is not an uncommon court sentence in Singapore, Fay's sentence garnered controversy and was widely covered in the media in the United States, as it was believed to be the first judicial corporal punishment involving an American citizen. The number of cane strokes in Fay's sentence was ultimately reduced from six to four after United States officials requested leniency. The sentence was carried out on 5 May 1994.

== Background ==
Fay was born on 30 May 1975. Fay's parents divorced when he was aged eight. He grew up in the United States, attending a boarding school near Pittsburgh before moving to Kettering, Ohio with his father in 1991. In 1992, he moved to Singapore to live with his mother and stepfather in the Regency Park neighborhood, where he was enrolled in the Singapore American School. In summer 1993, Fay opted to work as a waiter at the Hard Rock Café rather than returning to the United States for the school holidays.

== Incident ==
=== Theft and vandalism in Singapore ===
In September 1993, 67 cars were vandalised in various neighbourhoods of Singapore. The damage included spray painting and egging and at least one had its windshield smashed.

On 6 October, the Singapore Police Force arrested two teenagers who were driving a car similar to one that witnesses had described as being involved in the vandalism. During questioning, the two gave seven names, all male students from the Singapore American School and ISS International School, whom police tracked down and raided. They found about 41 stolen items, including a telephone booth and road signs. Fay was one of these students.

Fay was arrested on 6 October. He later stated that he had been assaulted, intimidated and threatened during police interrogation.

=== Sentencing ===
Fay pled guilty at trial. Under the 1966 Vandalism Act, originally passed to curb the spread of political graffiti and which specifically penalized vandalism of government property, Fay was sentenced on 3 March 1994, to four months in jail, a fine of S$3,500 (at the time equivalent to US$2,230 or £1,450), and six strokes of the cane. Another student who pleaded not guilty was sentenced to eight months in prison and 12 strokes of the cane.

On 20 April 1994, Fay made an appeal for clemency, with his lawyer, Dominic Nagulendran, arguing that the Vandalism Act provided caning only for indelible forms of graffiti vandalism and that the damaged cars had been cheaply restored to their original condition. Fay maintained that he had been advised his guilty plea would preclude caning and that his confession was false, that he never vandalised any cars, and that the only crime he committed was stealing signs. The Singapore government stood its ground and did not grant clemency to Fay. Nevertheless, on 4 May, President of Singapore Ong Teng Cheong reduced the severity of both sentences out of consideration for President Bill Clinton as it valued the good historical relations between the two countries.

Fay was caned on 5 May 1994, at the Queenstown Remand Centre. Before and after the caning, Fay was administered Valium for "acute distress". The sentence saw him stripped naked and strapped to a trestle with a protective covering placed over his kidneys and spine, with his buttocks being caned four times using a moistened 13mm-thick rattan rod. Fay estimated the caning lasted around one minute. After the final stroke, Fay shook hands with the caner and walked to his cell unaided. Following the caning, the Singapore Prison Service released a statement saying that Fay "was examined by a prison doctor after the caning and found to be in satisfactory condition".

== Response ==
=== Media and public reactions ===
Following Fay's sentence, the case received coverage by the American, Singaporean and international media.

Some US news outlets launched scathing attacks on Singapore's judicial system for what they considered an "archaic punishment", while others turned the issue into one of Singapore asserting "Asian values" towards "western decadence". The New York Times, The Washington Post and the Los Angeles Times ran editorials and op-eds condemning the punishment. USA Today reported that the caning involved "bits of flesh flying with each stroke."

However, Singapore also found supporters among the foreign media and the US public. For example, Chicago Tribune columnist Mike Royko reported that he had been sent a large number of letters, nearly all of which supported the punishment. A Los Angeles Times poll found that Americans were evenly divided (49% approved, 48% disapproved) as to the appropriateness of the punishment, but would have only been 36% in favor had the sentence been handed down inside the US.

=== From the United States government ===
The official position of the Clinton administration was that although it recognized Singapore's right to punish Fay within the due process of law, the punishment of caning was "excessive" for a teenager who committed a non-violent crime.

The United States Embassy in Singapore claimed that, while the graffiti and physical damage to the cars was not permanent, caning could leave Fay with permanent physical scars.

Clinton also called Fay's punishment "extreme" and "mistaken", as well as pressuring the Singapore government to grant Fay clemency from caning. Two dozen United States senators signed a letter to the Singapore government also appealing for clemency.

== Aftermath ==
Fay served two months and 21 days of his four-month prison sentence at Queenstown Remand Prison before being released early for good behavior on 21 June 1994. He returned to the United States to live with his father. He gave several television interviews, including one with his American lawyer on CNN with Larry King on 29 June 1994, in which he admitted taking road signs but denied vandalising cars. While he did not detail his experience, he said that he was "ill-treated" at times during questioning, but had shaken hands with the caning operative after his four strokes had been administered and the prison guards when he was released. He stated that the caning had left him with scars on both buttocks. He was invited to spend the summer of 1994 on a kibbutz in Israel.

Several months after returning to the United States, Fay suffered burns to his hands and face after a butane incident. He was subsequently admitted to the Hazelden rehabilitation program for butane abuse. He said that sniffing butane "made [him] forget what happened in Singapore." In 1996, he was cited in Florida for a number of violations, including careless driving, reckless driving, not reporting a crash, and having an open bottle of alcohol in a car. Later, in 1998, Fay was arrested for possession of marijuana and drug paraphernalia, charges to which he confessed but was acquitted because of technical errors in his arrest.

In June 2010, Fay's case was recalled in international news, after another foreigner in Singapore, Swiss national Oliver Fricker, was sentenced to five months in jail and three strokes of the cane for trespassing a rail depot to vandalise a train of the Mass Rapid Transit.

== In popular culture ==
On 14 May 1994, the American professional wrestling promotion Extreme Championship Wrestling staged an event, When Worlds Collide, which featured a tag team match pitting the Sandman and a partner of his choosing against Tommy Cairo and the Sandman's estranged wife Peaches, with the stipulation that the loser would receive six lashes from a "Singapore cane". This match led to the Singapore cane becoming established as a popular weapon in professional wrestling; the Sandman began carrying a Singapore cane to the ring for the remainder of his career.

The incident was referenced in the Weird Al Yankovic song "Headline News", released September 1994.

On 19 February 1995, the sixteenth episode of the sixth season of the American animated television series The Simpsons, "Bart vs. Australia", lampooned the caning.
