= Changi Depot =

Former MRT depot in Singapore

Changi Depot 樟宜车厂
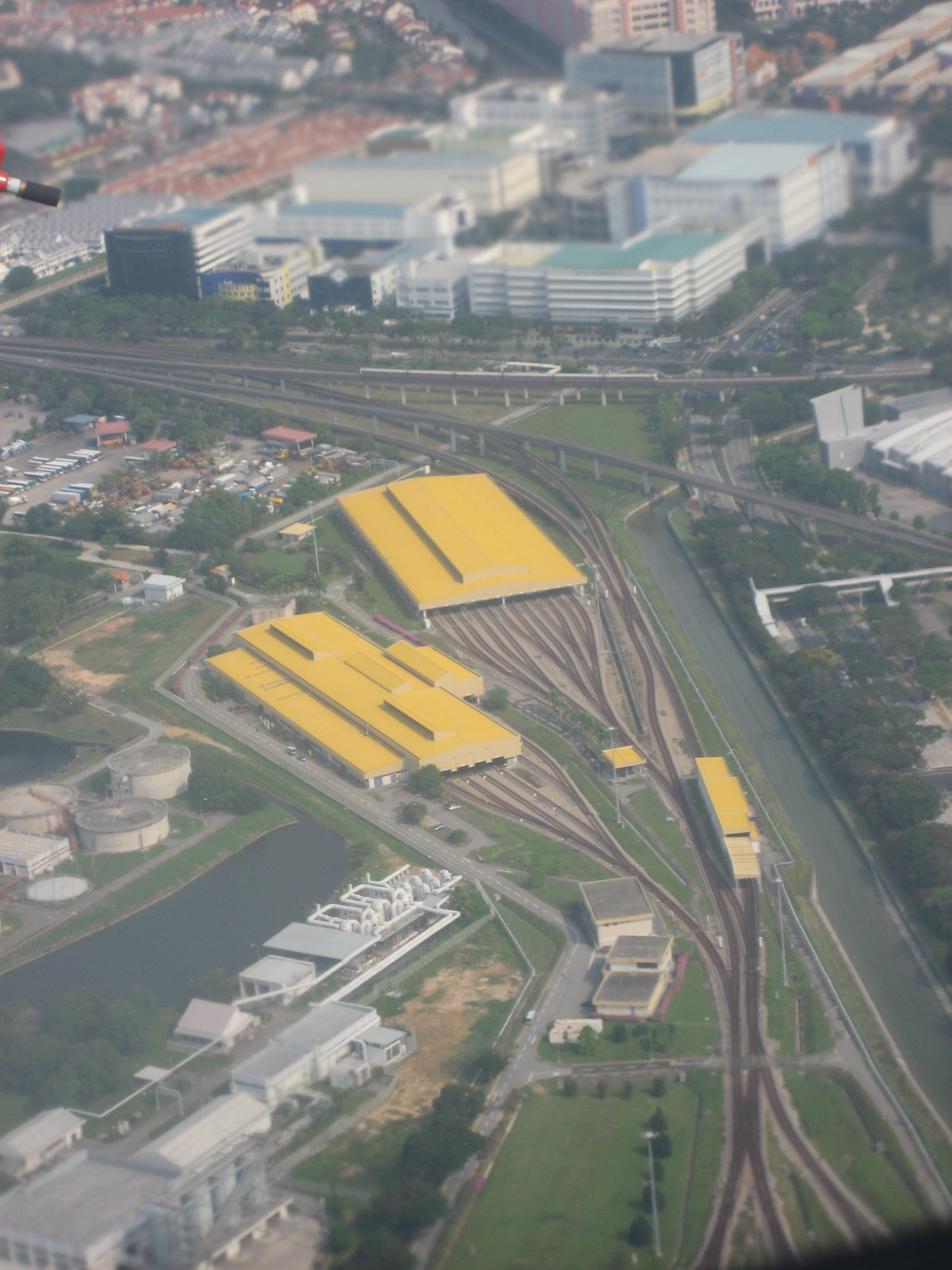
- Aerial view of Changi Depot in 2009
- Interactive map of Changi Depot 樟宜车厂

Location
- Location: 5 Koh Sek Lim Road, Singapore 486050
- Coordinates: 1°19′46.67″N 103°57′27.33″E

Characteristics
- Owner: Land Transport Authority
- Operator: SMRT Trains Ltd (SMRT Corporation)
- Depot code: CHD
- Type: At-grade
- Roads: Upper Changi Road East, Xilin Avenue
- Routes served: EWL East–West Line

History
- Opened: 4 November 1989; 37 years ago
- Closed: 14 March 2026; 8 months ago

Changi Depot was a train depot located in Xilin, Tampines near Koh Sek Lim Road, Singapore. Completed in November 1989 along with the extension of the East–West Line to Tanah Merah, it comprised a train yard which could hold a capacity of 46 trains, and had an area of 250,000 square metres (2,690,978 sq ft). The depot was used for both train inspection and deployment of trains to the East–West Line until its decommissioning on 14 March 2026; it was replaced by East Coast Integrated Depot.

The depot was located between Expo and Tanah Merah stations on the East–West Line, and had 2 reception tracks: 2 tracks westbound towards Tanah Merah station.

== History ==
Changi Depot was announced alongside with Ulu Pandan Depot by the Mass Rapid Transit Corporation (MRTC) in July 1983. The depot, to be situated at the junction of New Upper Changi Road and Bedok Road, was to planned to provide storing space for the trains and host minor maintenance work. The depot was also to be opened after the Bishan Depot. On 6 November 1983, the large part of the Changi Depot land was acquired for the MRT stabling yard. To construct the MRT depot, the Kampong Koh Sek Lim was cleared by December 1983, and residents had moved to Tampines and Bedok.

== Incidents ==
On 18 May 2010, a Kawasaki Heavy Industries C151 train carriage was deliberately vandalised in the depot. Elaborate graffiti was drawn on the lower half of the carriage.

A Swiss national, Oliver Fricker was charged with three charges of trespassing into the depot on the early hours of 17 May and vandalising the train by spraying paint and damaging public property by cutting a wired fence into property belonging to the Land Transport Authority. Another British national has also been named as being involved in the case. However, his whereabouts are unknown.

SMRT apologised for the security lapse on 8 June 2010. It reviewed the security measures in all depots together with the authorities. All personnel of the security companies, employed by SMRT, have been instructed to step up vigilance. The number of security personnel and patrols at each depot has been increased.

SMRT was fined S$50,000 for this incident.

== Replacement ==
In August 2014, plans were announced to replace the existing Changi Depot. The new depot, East Coast Integrated Depot, was built beside the current site. The depot currently houses the rolling stock of the East–West Line, with plans to also house the rolling stock of the Downtown Line and Thomson–East Coast Line by the end of 2026. The facility is an underground (66 tracks for DTL), at-grade (62 tracks for TEL) and elevated depot (72 tracks for EWL) spread over three levels for each line.

A service adjustment on the East–West Line involving the closure of the section between Tanah Merah and Expo stations took place from 14 to 16 March 2026, to disconnect Changi Depot from the line completely. Following that, the depot will then be demolished and the land will be returned to the state for conversion into recreational space.
