= Kidnapping Act (Singapore) =

Statute of the Parliament of Singapore

Kidnapping Act 1961

Legislative Assembly of Singapore
- Long title: An Act to provide for the punishment of the offences of abduction, wrongful restraint and wrongful confinement for ransom and other related offences and for matters incidental thereto.
- Citation: Ordinance 15 of 1961 (as Punishment for Kidnapping Ordinance 1961); now Kidnapping Act 1961 (2020 Revised Edition)
- Territorial extent: Singapore
- Passed by: Legislative Assembly of Singapore
- Passed: 24 May 1961
- Assented to by: Yang di-Pertuan Negara Yusof Ishak
- Assented to: 30 May 1961
- Commenced: 2 June 1961

Legislative history
- Bill title: Punishment for Kidnapping Bill
- Bill citation: Bill No. 137/1961
- Introduced by: Ong Pang Boon, Minister for Home Affairs
- First reading: 26 April 1961
- Second reading: 24 May 1961
- Third reading: 24 May 1961

Amended by
- Statute Law Revision Act, 1969; Statutes of the Republic of Singapore (Miscellaneous Amendments) Act, 1973; Revised Edition of the Laws (Rectification) Order 1989; Post Office Savings Bank of Singapore (Transfer of Undertakings and Dissolution) Act 1998; Postal Services Act 1999
- Status: In force (amended)

The Kidnapping Act 1961 is a statute in Singapore that criminalizes the illegal abduction, wrongful restraints and wrongful confinement of any person for ransom. The law is designed specifically to make acts of knowingly seeking and receiving ransom in connection with the kidnap of any person a criminal offence.

== Overview ==
=== Legislative history ===
Originally entitled as Punishment for Kidnapping Ordinance 1961, the bill for this ordinance was tabled to the Legislative Assembly of Singapore on 26 April 1961, and was passed by the assembly on 24 May without amendment. The bill's contents were also published to the public on 6 May that year. The Yang di-Pertuan Negara Yusof Ishak gave his assent to the bill on 30 May and the ordinance became effective on 2 June 1961. The ordinance was then revised and renamed as the Kidnapping Act in 1970.

=== Legal provisions ===
The Kidnapping Act defines the punishment to be meted out for different scenarios of violations, and serves as an instrument for imprisoning and caning of offenders. The abduction, wrongful restraint or wrongful confinement for ransom is primarily subjected to a mandatory minimum penalty of life imprisonment, plus caning, and a maximum of capital punishment. The Act also prescribes punishment for accomplices and individuals that consort with offenders and kidnappers, such as those that receive ransoms and negotiate for ransoms. The Act empowers the Public Prosecutor to freeze bank accounts and order the inspection of books, accounts, receipts, vouchers or other documents, and to obtain information as well as intercepting communication. The Act expresses that it is the duty of any person in the know to give information on kidnapping acts to the police, and such a person may also be found guilty and subjected to a fine and imprisonment if he or she fails in doing so.

== Uses of the Act ==
In the mid-2010s, kidnap scams were more proliferate in Singapore than the actual act of kidnapping itself. The Singapore Police Force has set up the Scam Alert web service that keeps Singaporeans informed on the latest scams such as kidnapping scams.

== See also ==
- Kidnapping
- Kidnapping Act 1961 (Malaysia)
- Singapore Police Force
