= List of websites blocked in Singapore =

This is a list of websites that are blocked in Singapore. These websites are mainly unlicensed gambling, pimping (known as vice related activities), copyright infringement/piracy, and for spreading falsehoods. Some websites may be blocked because they are suspected scam websites. Websites that are blocked in Singapore are easily circumvented by a DNS change without the need to use a VPN.

As of 2019, there were 202 vice-related websites blocked by Singaporean authorities.

== Table of blocked websites ==
Site name	Domain or URL	Type of site	Reason	Applicable law	Implementation date	Ref
123Movies	123movies.as	Illegal streaming site	copyright infringement	Copyright Act	September 2022	
Alamak.io	Alamak.io	inauthentic news website	"potential hostile information threat"	Broadcasting Act	October 2024	
Ashley Madison	ashleymadison.com	online dating service	"promotes and facilitates extramarital affairs"		November 2013	
Asia Sentinel	asiasentinel.com	America-based blog about Asia	"not complying with POFMA correction direction"	POFMA	2 June 2023	
Epicsports.online	epicsports.online	Illegal streaming site	"infringe intellectual property"	Copyright Act	February 2026	
GenderGP	gendergp.com	Online gender clinic	public health risk		December 2024	
KickassTorrents		BitTorrent index of digital content	copyright infringing/piracy	Copyright Act	May 2018	
Lawyers for Liberty	lawyersforliberty.org	human rights NGO	"non-compliance" with a correction direction issued against a statement on its website	POFMA	23 January 2020	
Lion City Life	Lioncitylife.com	inauthentic news website	"potential hostile information threat"	Broadcasting Act	October 2024	
MalaysiaNow	malaysianow.com	news website	"non-compliance" with a correction direction issued against a statement on its website	POFMA	November 2025	
Nanyang Weekly	nanyangweekly.com	inauthentic news website	"potential hostile information threat"	Broadcasting Act	April 2026	
Playboy	playboy.com	American men's lifestyle and entertainment magazine	nudity		1996	
Polymarket	polymarket.com	Predictive crypto gambling site	Unlawful gambling	Gambling Control Act	December 2024	
Pornhub	pornhub.com	pornography video sharing site	Blocked due to pornography		May 2016	
Redtube	redtube.com	pornography video sharing site	"symbolic statement" of the country's societal values		May 2018	
RojaDirecta	various domains	Illegal streaming site	"infringe intellectual property"	Copyright Act	February 2026	
Singapore 24 Hour	singapore24hour.com	inauthentic news website	"potential hostile information threat"	Broadcasting Act	April 2026	
Singapore Buzz	singaporebuzz.com	inauthentic news website	"potential hostile information threat"	Broadcasting Act	April 2026	
Singapore Dao Times	Singdaotimes.com	inauthentic news website	"potential hostile information threat"	Broadcasting Act	October 2024	
Singapore Era	Singaporeera.com	inauthentic news website	"potential hostile information threat"	Broadcasting Act	October 2024	
Singapore Headline	singaporeheadline.com	inauthentic news website	"potential hostile information threat"	Broadcasting Act	April 2026	
Singapore Info Map	singaporeinfomap.com	inauthentic news website	"potential hostile information threat"	Broadcasting Act	October 2024	
Singapore Week	singaporeweek.com	inauthentic news website	"potential hostile information threat"	Broadcasting Act	April 2026	
Singapura Now	Singapuranow.com	inauthentic news website	"potential hostile information threat"	Broadcasting Act	October 2024	
Singdao PR	Singdaopr.com	inauthentic news website	"potential hostile information threat"	Broadcasting Act	October 2024	
Solarmovie	Solarmovie.ph	BitTorrent index of digital content	copyright infringing/piracy	Copyright Act	February 2016	
SportsBay	sportsbay.es	Illegal streaming site	copyright infringement	Copyright Act	September 2022	
States Times Review		Socio-political website	defamation of Singapore government	POFMA	November 2018	
The Pirate Bay	thepiratebay.org	BitTorrent index of digital content	copyright infringing/piracy	Copyright Act	May 2018	
The Singapore Times	sgtimes.com	inauthentic news website	"potential hostile information threat"	Broadcasting Act	April 2026	
Today in Singapore	Todayinsg.com	inauthentic news website	"potential hostile information threat"	Broadcasting Act	October 2024	
Voice of Asia Singapore	Voasg.com	inauthentic news website	"potential hostile information threat"	Broadcasting Act	October 2024	
WatchSeries	watchseries.ninja	Illegal streaming site	copyright infringement	Copyright Act	September 2022	
YouPorn	youporn.com	pornography video sharing site	"symbolic statement" of the country's societal values		May 2018	
Zao Bao Daily	zaobaodaily.com	inauthentic news website	"potential hostile information threat"	Broadcasting Act	October 2024	

== Media coverage ==
On 1 March 2022, the Asia Video Industry Association's Coalition Against Piracy (CAP) announced that it had obtained a court order from the Singapore High Court for the blocking of 30 illegal streaming sites and nearly 150 domain names associated with those sites.

On 28 September 2022, CAP stated that it had obtained a further court order for the blocking of a total of 245 domain names which provided access to 30 illegal streaming sites.

On 4 February 2026, the British Premier League obtained a court order to block access to 47 piracy websites, including RojaDirecta and Epicsports.online, streaming its content under the Copyright Act.

== See also ==
- Internet censorship in Singapore
