= Foreign Interference (Countermeasures) Act 2021 =

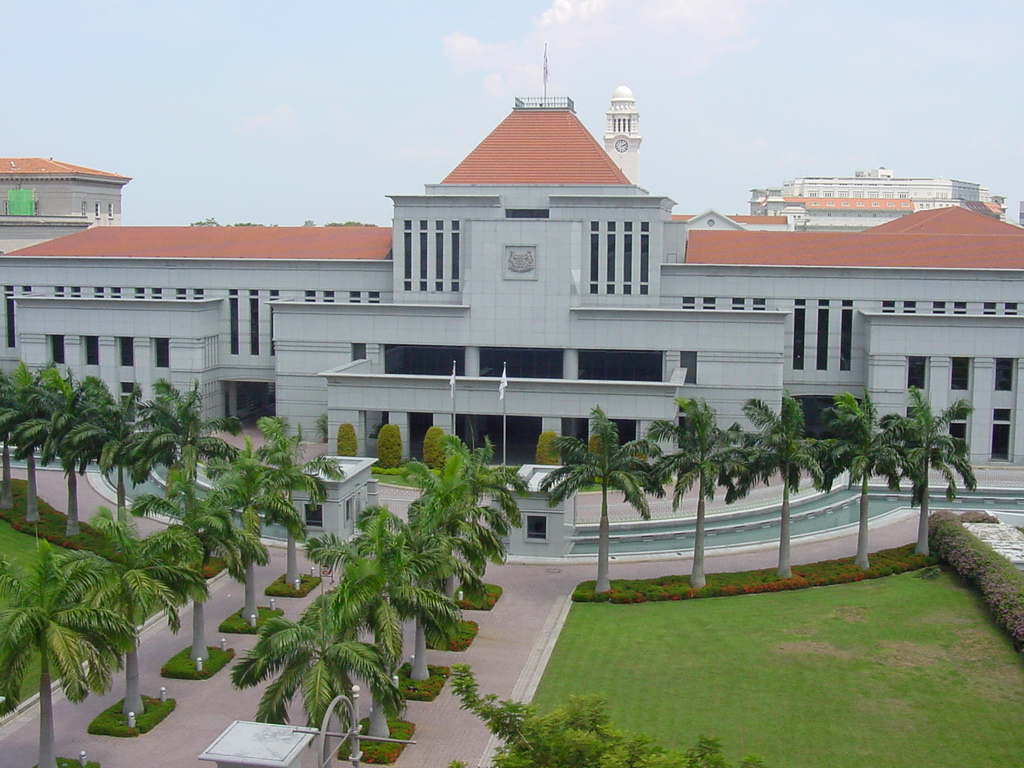

Parliament of Singapore
- Long title: An Act to counteract foreign interference in the public interest, to repeal the Political Donations Act (Chapter 236 of the 2001 Revised Edition) and to make consequential and related amendments to certain other Acts.
- Citation: Act 28 of 2021
- Considered by: Parliament of Singapore
- Passed: 4 October 2021
- Commenced: 7 July 2022

Legislative history
- Bill title: Foreign Interference (Countermeasures) Bill
- Bill citation: Bill 24 of 2021
- Introduced by: K. Shanmugam (Minister for Home Affairs)
- Introduced: 13 September 2021
- First reading: 13 September 2021
- Second reading: 4 October 2021
- Third reading: 4 October 2021
- Status: Current legislation

The Foreign Interference (Countermeasures) Act 2021, or Fica/FICA, is a statute of the Parliament of Singapore. Enacted in 2021, it seeks to "protect the public interest by counteracting acts of foreign interference". The Bill was introduced on 13 September 2021 and passed on 4 October 2021.

== Background ==
Legislation targeting foreign influence in Singapore had been mooted in as early as 2017. In March 2021, Second Minister for Home Affairs Josephine Teo announced that the government was considering the use of "legislative levers" to combat foreign influence.

== Key provisions ==
The act grants the Minister for Home Affairs the authority to investigate individuals suspected of being foreign agents engaged in "hostile information campaigns". An independent panel, chaired by a judge, will consider appeals against the minister's findings, although persons marked as "politically significant" may not be allowed to file such appeals. Authorities will also be allowed to compel social media platforms and website operators to hand over user data, without any justification in select instances.

== Reactions and statements ==
The Facebook global head of cybersecurity policy Nathaniel Gleicher said on September 28, "We don't want foreign interference, in particular, covert influence operations, on our platform", noting "Singapore is one of the first countries to take a legislative approach to tackling this challenge, and as with any new legislative approach, we want to be careful to understand how it's going to work in practice, what its implications will be, what it means for user privacy, for freedom of expression, and for security". He noted that "the Bill is worded very broadly, and foreign interference as a concept is actually a very broad concept."

Reporters Without Borders described the act as "legal monstrosity with totalitarian leanings", while asserting that "(i)t is clearly independent media outlets that the FICA is targeting on national sovereignty grounds." Thum Ping Tjin asserted that the bill was a "coup" attempt by Minister for Home Affairs K. Shanmugam.

Member of Parliament Gerald Giam opined that the bill had a "significant impact on free speech and government accountability". In a joint statement published on 1 October, Singaporean academics Cherian George, Chong Ja Ian, Linda Lim, and Teo You Yenn expressed their concern that Fica would curtail academic freedom in the country.

A day after the legislation was passed, Amnesty International described Fica as "a tool for crushing dissent". Following K. Shanmugam's parliamentary speech on Fica, Kirsten Han, Lim Tean, Jolovan Wham and Terry Xu among others were issued correction orders from the POFMA Office under the Protection from Online Falsehoods and Manipulation Act under the direction of the Ministry of Home Affairs, instructing them to correct their statements and apologise.

== Legislative history ==
The Foreign Interference (Countermeasures) Bill was introduced to Parliament on 13 September 2021 by Minister for Home Affairs K. Shanmugam. On 29 September, the Workers' Party announced amendments it had tabled two days earlier for the next parliamentary sitting. They included judicial oversight, a more precise scope of executive powers under the law to prevent abuse, and greater and transparency as to who was subject to the law. Although party members understood the need to prevent foreign interference, they disagreed with the bill as initially written. On 30 September, Non-constituency Member of Parliament Leong Mun Wai filed an unsuccessful petition to delay the passage of the bill. A second reading of the bill took place on 4 October, during which Shanmugam gave a two-hour-long speech defending Fica, while stating that the government would accept some of the 44 amendments proposed by the Workers' Party. The bill was passed in Parliament the same day, at around 11:15 pm; 75 Members of Parliament (all 70 from the People's Action Party and 5 Nominated Members of Parliament) voted in favour of the legislation, whereas 11 from the Workers' Party and the Progress Singapore Party objected with 2 abstentions (all NMPs).

== Uses of the Act ==
On 2 February 2024, the Registrar of Foreign and Political Disclosures, which operates under the purview of the Ministry of Home Affairs, announced its intention to list Hong Kong-born businessman Philip Chan as a "politically significant person". At the time of intended designation, Chan was the president of both the Hong Kong Chamber of Commerce in Singapore and the Kowloon Club, a Singaporean social club helping Hong Kong immigrants to adapt to Singapore. In addition to attending the Chinese People's Political Consultative Conference as an overseas delegate, Chan was also a patron of two Singaporean grassroot organisations, namely the Kampong Chai Chee Citizens’ Consultative Committee and the Bukit Timah Community Club management committee. After reviewing his submissions, the Registrar confirmed its designation of Chan as a politically significant person on 26 February 2024, making him the first person in Singapore to be named as such.

On 20 July 2024, the Ministry of Home Affairs issued Account Restriction Directions to X, Facebook, Instagram, YouTube, and TikTok that required them to block 95 Guo Wengui-affiliated social media accounts from being accessed in Singapore.
