= 2013 Singapore cyberattacks =

Cyberattacks done on Singaporean websites

- The hacked version of Irene Tham's blog on The Straits Times, one of many websites affected by the cyberattacks.
- Date: October to November 2013
- Location: Singapore
- Cause: Denial-of-service attack; DNS spoofing; Website defacement
- Motive: Introduction of internet censorship laws in Singapore
- Target: Main target: Government of Singapore; Other targets: PAP Community Foundation; Ang Mo Kio Town Council; The Straits Times; Various high-profile Facebook and Twitter accounts; Various other websites
- Outcome: Multiple websites affected, most of which were vandalised by the attackers. Main perpetrator arrested in Malaysia and extradited to Singapore in November 2013.
- Arrests: 1
- Suspects: James Raj s/o Arokiasamy
- Sentence: Four years and eight months' imprisonment

The 2013 Singapore cyberattacks were a series of cyberattacks initiated by the hacktivist organisation Anonymous, conducted partly in response to web censorship regulations in Singapore. A member of Anonymous, known by the online handle "The Messiah", claimed responsibility for spearheading the attacks. On 12 November 2013, James Raj was charged in a Singapore court as the alleged "Messiah".

== Background ==
On 1 June 2013, a set of web censorship regulations drafted by the Media Development Authority became effective in Singapore. Under the new rules,

websites with at least 50,000 unique visitors from Singapore every month that publish at least one local news article per week over a period of two months ... will have to remove 'prohibited content' such as articles that undermine 'racial or religious harmony' within 24 hours of being notified by Singapore's media regulator.

In response to concerns regarding the new rules, government officials responded that they "do not impinge on internet freedom".

== Incidents ==
On 17 October 2013, the attacks began with the People's Action Party's Community Foundation's webpage being hacked, followed by the official website of the Ang Mo Kio Town Council on 28 October 2013. Site administrators locked the site thereafter and a police report was made.

Two days later, a purported member of Anonymous uploaded a four-minute-long video on YouTube, in which he, wearing a Guy Fawkes mask, threatened to "bring down key infrastructure in Singapore". He also urged Singaporeans to don red and black on 5 November as well as black out their Facebook profile pictures. In the video, he made reference to The Messiah, who he called "one of [Anonymous'] comrades".

The Straits Times news reporter Irene Tham posted a critique of the video on her newspaper blog. In retaliation, the Messiah defaced the blog, its title being changed to "Dear ST [Straits Times]: You just got hacked for misleading the people!". The Messiah edited the article to state that Tham had misconstrued his speech, "conveniently modifying the sentence 'war against the Singapore government' into 'war against Singapore'." He also urged Tham to either apologise within two days or resign from her job as a result of her "blasphemous lies".

Later on, in an email to Yahoo Singapore, The Messiah said

we reached out to our comrades from other fractions [sic] who together with us performed DNS poisoning on the .gov.sg sites, taking them down for a period of time. But there must have also been some patching that was done as some of our favourite point of entries into their networks seemed to be fixed.

On 3 November, the website of the Seletar Airport was hacked. Its webpage replaced with a black and green background with an image in the middle resembling a skull wearing a hood. The site resumed normal operations 30 minutes after the hack was first noticed.

On 5 November, the Twitter and YouTube accounts of Singaporean entertainer Ridhwan Azman were hacked. According to posts from the compromised account, this was in retaliation for "dissing the legion". Apart from this incident, Anonymous did not carry out any other major activity, contrary to its promise to ignite a massive protest on that date.

Two days later, the hacktivists hacked into and vandalised a subpage on the website of Singapore Prime Minister Lee Hsien Loong, following Lee's vow to bring The Messiah and his accomplices to justice. It was later found that Mohammad Azhar Bin Tahir and Mohammad Asyiq Bin Tahir were responsible for the attacks. Additionally, the webpage of the Istana was hacked.

On 20 November, the websites of 13 schools, which were hosted on a single server, were reportedly defaced between 3:30pm to 5pm.

== Conviction of James Raj Arokiasamy ==
In November 2013, the "Messiah", identified as James Raj Arokiasamy, was arrested by the Royal Malaysia Police and extradited back to Singapore to be charged and undergo investigations. In January 2015, James Raj pleaded guilty to a total of more than 160 criminal charges, including 39 charges of computer misuse and four drug-related charges, and he was sentenced to a total of four years and eight months in jail (equivalent to 56 months).

== Reception ==
News of the cyberattacks were picked up by international news outlets, including the South China Morning Post, The Huffington Post, Time, The Star, and The Jakarta Post.

Regarding the hacking of the Ang Mo Kio Town Council's website, Member of Parliament Ang Hin Kee dubbed it as "malicious", promising to boost the page's security system.

After the release of the YouTube video, the Government IT Security Incident Response Team immediately released an alert to all the Singaporean government agencies. The Infocomm Development Authority of Singapore responded in an official statement, "We are aware of the video, and the police are investigating the matter." The Singapore Press Holdings (SPH), of which The Straits Times is a subsidiary, promptly took down the blog which was hacked into and filed a complaint to the police.

Singaporean politician and Deputy Chairman of Singapore's Parliamentary Committee for Communications and Information, Baey Yam Keng, offered, "We do not know what the hacker's capabilities are, so it's important for us to take this very seriously." Bertha Henson, who operates Breakfast Network, a Singaporean news outlet, felt that The Messiah's action would "make the government seem right, that we [independent website operators] are just troublemakers."

Prime Minister Lee Hsien Loong pledged to hunt down the team responsible for the cyberattack, stating, "It is not a laughing matter. It's not just anything goes, and you're anonymous, therefore there's no responsibility. You may think you are anonymous. We will make that extra effort to find out who you are."

The cyberattacks were featured in the tenth episode of the 2015 season of Crimewatch.

== See also ==
- Timeline of events associated with Anonymous
