= Philip Chan =

Philip Chan may refer to:

- Philip Chan (actor) (born 1945), Hong Kong actor, film director, producer and screenwriter
- Philip Chan (businessman), Hong Kong-born businessman
- Philip Chan Siu Kwan, Hong Kong footballer
- Philip Chan (scientist), Hong Kong professor of electrical and electronic engineering
