= Select Committee on Deliberate Online Falsehoods =

Committee of the Parliament of Singapore

The Select Committee on Deliberate Online Falsehoods is a select committee of the Parliament of Singapore that was formed on 11 January 2018 to examine and report on the problem of deliberate online falsehoods and to recommend strategies to deal with them.

The committee is chaired by Deputy Speaker Charles Chong and consist of members; Minister of Law and Home Affairs K Shanmugam, Senior Minister of State for Communications and Information and for Education Janil Puthucheary, Social and Family Development Minister Desmond Lee, Members of Parliament (MPs) Rahayu Mahzam, Seah Kian Peng, Sun Xueling and Edwin Tong, as well as Workers' Party MP Pritam Singh and Nominated Member of Parliament Chia Yong Yong.

== Background ==
On 3 April 2017, Minister of Law and Home Affairs K Shanmugam called for a review of existing laws to combat fake news. He cited the websites The Real Singapore which published an article claiming that a commotion between Thaipusam participants and the police was sparked by complaints from a Filipino family, the States Times Review which mocked former President S. R. Nathan with an article claiming near-zero turnout for his funeral, and All Singapore Stuff which reported eye-witness account of a collapsed HDB roof at Punggol Waterway Terraces which fooled the police and civil defence to investigate.

The Minister claimed that fake news, when not debunked, can quickly cause harm to Singaporeans, panic to public, waste emergency resources, and damage reputations of businesses and people. He also claimed that nasty people seek to profit from fake news and that foreign agencies and foreign governments seek to destabilise the government through fake news.

During his keynote speech at "Keep It Real: Truth And Trust In The Media" conference on 19 June 2017, Shanmugam said the government has to maintain a strong climate of trust, and be able to counter misinformation spread online. He cited a recent government survey that supported his notion for stronger laws to combat fake news.

Shanmugam claimed that Singapore has been "particularly vulnerable" to foreign influences via fake news. "If the distrust becomes deep-rooted, people will have serious doubts about the institutions, about leadership, about governance," he said.

On 5 January 2018, the Ministry of Communications and Information (MCI) and Ministry of Law (MinLaw) published a Green Paper titled "Deliberate Online Falsehoods" detailing the need to establish a Select Committee to examine fake news threat in Singapore. On 10 January 2018, 80 MPs present voted unanimously in Parliament to appoint a Select Committee of eight PAP MPs, one opposition MP and one NMP to study and report on the problem of deliberate online falsehoods and recommend strategies to deal with them.

== Written representations ==
164 written representations were submitted to the Select Committee over a seven-week period which ended on 7 March 2018. Among those who made submissions were media organisations, technology companies, foreign and local academics and experts, commentators, as well as members of the public.

In its written representation, Facebook "do[es] not believe that legislation is the best approach" and that "Singapore already has a variety of existing laws and regulations which address hate speech, defamation and the spreading of false news".

Singaporean historian Thum Ping Tjin submitted a paper arguing that any legislation by the Singapore Parliament against online falsehood must also apply to the Singapore government. He argued that government's use of detention without trial between 1963 and 1988 during Operation Coldstore and Operation Spectrum. While the government has stated that the detainees were part of a communist plot or Marxist conspiracy to subvert the state, Thum claimed that the government has never produced any evidence to substantiate its claims nor have any detainees been brought to trial on the charges they were detained under. Thum argued that these justifications were false claims made by politicians of the ruling People's Action Party (PAP) for the purpose of political gain.

== Public hearings ==
The Select Committee convened public hearings from 14 to 29 March 2018, lasting eight days in total, where 79 individuals and organisations were invited to testify.

On 22 March, Facebook's vice-president of public policy for Asia-Pacific, Simon Milner, was questioned by the Select Committee, who was concerned that the law was being introduced in "a rush" by Singapore, and that "legislation which is enacted in haste can often be regretted". Law and Home Affairs Minister K. Shanmugam also pressed on Facebook's lack of transparency about the Facebook–Cambridge Analytica data scandal.

On 29 March, the last day of the sitting of the Select Committee, Shanmugam questioned Thum about a paper he published in 2013 regarding Operation Coldstore and the formation of Malaysia. He said Thum fell short of the standards of an objective historian, saying that he "ignores evidence which you don't like, you ignore and suppress what is inconvenient and in your writings you present quite an untrue picture". Thum countered that his paper had been peer-reviewed and that no historian had stepped forward to contradict the central thrust of his work.

Channel NewsAsia and The Straits Times reported that Thum admitted that there were parts of the paper which he could have worded better, that some of his statements were misleading, and that he had not read nor bother to quote many of the accounts of some communist leaders as he felt that those accounts were unreliable. These included the first-hand accounts of Chin Peng, the leader of the Malayan Communist Party. However, in a subsequent follow-up submission to the Select Committee, Thum claimed that the reports took his words out of context, arguing that "the crux of my original submission was not addressed in the discussion", "the fundamental arguments... were not raised nor challenged", and "at no point did I accept that any part of my article was inaccurate or misleading". He insisted that "my overall point in my article that Operation Coldstore was fundamentally motivated by political, not security, reasons, stands".

== Reactions ==
Civil activists groups Community Action Network, Function 8, and Maruah, as well as activists Kirsten Han, Terry Xu, and Thum himself, criticised the open hearings, accusing the Select Committee of failing to adhere to its own terms of reference, and claiming the hearings had not been conducted in an open or consultative manner.

A letter signed by 170 academics was submitted to Chong, criticising the hearing as an attempt to attack and destroy Thum's credibility and discredit his research, with the effect of stifling the freedom of expression and academic freedom in Singapore. A letter from six of Thum's colleagues at the University of Oxford's Project Southeast Asia also expressed concerns about how Thum was treated at the hearing, saying that Thum's research, which Shanmugam had criticised, had "already met the rigorous standards of examination at Oxford and peer review by fellow historical experts on the region". The letter also expressed concerns about the "implications for academic freedom, and for freedom of expression in Singapore", saying that the hearing "appears designed to intimidate those who seek to publish the truth".

In response, Chong argued that it was Thum who had chosen to make a political point in his written submission to the Select Committee, and that while Thum was entitled to his views, he must expect to be questioned about his claims. He also characterised Thum's submission as a "political piece" rather than an "academic dissertation".

Chong also released a report based upon attached emails between two trustees of Project Southeast Asia that were copied, likely inadvertently, to the Select Committee, showing email discussions between Thum and Philip Kreager from the University of Oxford's Project Southeast Asia regarding the drafting and sharing of a letter in support of Thum. Chong accused Thum of having "engineered" the open letter in support of himself, as well as getting Kraeger to canvass for support on his behalf. Chong alleged "a coordinated attempt, with foreign actors involved, to try to influence and subvert our parliamentary processes". Kreager called Chong's statement "clearly preposterous", insisting that the emails were merely to "exchange views", and accusing Chong of imagining a "conspiracy".

On 13 April, the Parliament Secretariat wrote to Thum to clarify his academic credentials following his claims to be a "research fellow in history" in his submission and holding "a visiting professorship in anthropology at Oxford University" during his oral testimony. Following media enquiries, the University of Oxford replied that Thum was a research associate at the School of Anthropology and Museum Ethnography.

== Protection from Online Falsehoods and Manipulation Act ==
On 1 April 2019, the Protection from Online Falsehoods and Manipulation (POFMA) Bill was tabled in parliament for first reading. The Ministry of Law stated that the legislation seeks to protect the society from deliberate online falsehoods created by malicious actors by targeting falsehoods, not opinions and criticisms, nor satire or parody. It defines a falsehood as a statement of fact that is false or misleading. After concerns were raised about the Bill's scope, ministers gave reassurances that the bill will not affect free speech. The Bill was passed with a 72–9 vote on 8 May 2019 after a two-day debate. POFMA came into effect on 2 October 2019, with the Infocomm Media Development Authority (IMDA) the agency in charge of the Act. Subsidiary legislation is also laid out in the Act detailing how the Act will work, including court challenges that take nine days at maximum and cost as little as $200.

== See also ==
- Fake news
