= Blocking of Twitter in Nigeria =

2021–2022 event

Twitter was blocked in Nigeria from 5 June 2021 to 13 January 2022. The government imposed a ban on the social network after it deleted tweets made by, and temporarily suspended, the Nigerian president Muhammadu Buhari, threatening the southeastern people of Nigeria, predominantly Igbo people, of a potential repeat of the 1967 Nigerian Civil War due to the ongoing insurgency in Southeastern Nigeria. The Nigerian government claimed that the deletion of the president's tweets factored into their decision, but it was ultimately based on "a litany of problems with the social media platform in Nigeria, where misinformation and fake news spread through it have had real world violent consequences", citing the persistent use of the platform for activities that are capable of undermining Nigeria's corporate existence.

In January 2022, Nigeria lifted its blocking of Twitter after the platform agreed to establish a legal entity within the country sometime in the first quarter of 2022.

== Background ==
On 1 June 2021, Nigerian President Muhammadu Buhari posted a tweet threatening a crackdown on regional separatists "in the language they understand". The next day, Twitter deleted the tweet, claiming it was in violation of Twitter rules, but gave no further details. Nigeria's Information Minister Lai Mohammed said that Twitter's actions were part of an unfair double standard, as Twitter had not banned incitement tweets from other groups. During the Nigerian Civil War a majority of deaths resulted from the blockade of Biafra which caused the deaths of millions of civilians from starvation, a fact that was not alluded to in the tweet.

The Nigerian government has long held concerns over the use of Twitter in the country. The ongoing local End SARS protest began on Twitter and got amplified in 2020 when it had 48 million tweets in ten days. Buhari's government floated the idea of social media regulation on different occasions prior to banning Twitter. Attempts to pass an anti-social media bill in the past have failed majorly due to massive outcry on Twitter. Days before the ban, the country's minister of information called Twitter's activities in Nigeria suspicious, citing its influence on the End SARS protests.

== Aftermath ==
Three days after Twitter was suspended, it was reported that the move had cost the country over 6 billion naira and would also contribute to the worsening unemployment in the country. ExpressVPN reported an over 200 percent increase in web traffic and searches for VPN spiked across the country. In response, Nigeria's Minister of Justice and Attorney General of the Federation Abubakar Malami at first openly threatened to prosecute citizens who bypass the ban using a VPN but then denied saying so after a screenshot of a Twitter deactivation notification he shared on Facebook showed a VPN logo.

Nigeria's cultural minister Lai Mohammed stated the ban would be lifted once Twitter submitted to locally licensing, registration and conditions. "It will be licensed by the broadcasting commission, and must agree not to allow its platform to be used by those who are promoting activities that are inimical to the corporate existence of Nigeria."

In late June 2021, Twitter announced it would enter talks with the Nigerian government over the platform's suspension. The talks began in July 2021.

On 15 September 2021, Mohammed said the Nigerian government will lift the ban on Twitter in a "few days." The Minister said Twitter gave a progress report of their talks with them, adding that it has been productive and quite respectful.

On 1 October 2021, President Muhammadu Buhari in his Independence Day broadcast said Twitter must meet the Nigerian government's five conditions before the suspension of the social media platform will be lifted. The conditions are: Respect for national security and cohesion; registration, physical presence and representation in Nigeria; fair taxation; dispute resolution; local content.

== Reactions ==
The ban was condemned by Amnesty International, the British, Canadian and Swedish diplomatic missions to Nigeria, as well as the United States and the European Union in a joint statement. Two domestic organizations, the Socio-Economic Rights and Accountability Project (SERAP) and the Nigerian Bar Association, indicated intent to challenge the ban in court. Twitter itself called the ban "deeply concerning".

Former U.S. President Donald Trump, who was permanently suspended from Twitter following the United States Capitol attack in January, praised the ban, stating "Congratulations to the country of Nigeria, who just banned Twitter because they banned their President", and also called on other countries to ban Twitter and Facebook due to "not allowing free and open speech."

== Lifting of the ban ==
On 12 January 2022, the Nigerian Government lifted the ban after Twitter agreed to pay an "applicable tax" and establish "a legal entity in Nigeria during the first quarter of 2022".
