= Kokila Annamalai =

Singaporean human rights activist (born 1988)

- கோகிலா அண்ணாமலை
- Born: 3 September 1988 (age 38); Singapore
- Occupation: Activist
- Organization(s): Transformative Justice Collective; Workers Make Possible

Annamalai Kokila Parvathi (Tamil: கோகிலா அண்ணாமலை; born 3 September 1988) is a Singaporean human rights activist, known for her public campaigning for the abolition of the death penalty in Singapore.

Annamalai was the first Singaporean activist to publicly refuse to comply with the Protection from Online Falsehoods and Manipulation Act (POFMA) after the Singaporean government accused her of posting false information about its actions on social media.

== Early life ==
Kokila was born in Singapore in 1988. She graduated from Methodist Girls School and the National University of Singapore.

== Activism ==
After graduating from university, she joined AWARE.

Annamalai is a public critic of the use of the death penalty in Singapore. She co-founded the Transformative Justice Collective (TJC), an abolition group, after the resumption of executions in Singapore following the easing of COVID-19 restrictions. Through the TJC, Annamalai took part in public campaigns and lobbying aimed at abolishing the death penalty, including a planned exhibition on the anti-capital punishment movement which was subsequently banned by the Infocomm Media Development Authority; she also supported prisoners on death row and their families. In 2023, Annamalai supported Tangaraju Suppiah with his ultimately unsuccessful appeal against his death sentence, and facilitated his mother seeing him the day before his execution. She subsequently published an article detailing the lead up to Subbaiah's execution as well as the aftermath.

In addition to her death penalty activism, Annamalai is also an activist for labour rights and tenant rights through Workers Make Possible. In February 2024, she led a demonstration outside The Istana wherein she and other activists delivered letters to the Prime Minister of Singapore, Lee Hsien Loong, urging him to end diplomatic ties with Israel in response to the Palestinian genocide. On 27 June 2025, Annamalai was charged with "abetment of organising a public procession in a prohibited area" and "mobilising the public" under the Public Order Act. On 21 October, she along with two others were acquitted of the charges. On 30 April 2026, their acquittals were overturned on appeal by the Attorney-General's Chambers, and they were fined S$3,000 each.

=== Refusal to follow POFMA orders ===
Following the execution of Azwan bin Bohari in October 2024, Annamalai posted a status about his execution on Facebook on 2 October, as well as a separate post on X the following day. On 5 October, the Singaporean government ordered that Annamalai publish a "correction" on social media under the POFMA Act, accusing her of suggesting that it scheduled executions "arbitrarily and without regard for due legal processes". They requested the correction include reference to death row prisoners "abusing the court process" by filing last-minute appeals to postpone scheduled executions. The TJC was also ordered to publish a correction on similar posts made on its social media accounts; TJC ultimately complied with the order.

Annamalai declined to remove the posts or to publish the correction, stating that her posts were about how "bureaucratic decisions" were "confusing and traumatising" for prisoners and their families, stating that bin Bohari's execution notice had been made four days prior to the scheduled execution date despite him having an ongoing legal appeal in process at the time the date was set. Annamalai also criticised the Misuse of Drugs Act which had meant that people including bin Bohari had been found guilty of drug trafficking based solely on possessing drugs over a certain quantity, with the burden of proof falling on the suspect and not the prosecution. On 22 October, Annamalai released a statement publicly confirming she would defy the order, stating "there are no false facts in the post" and refusing to become a "mouthpiece" for the government by publishing a correction, instead challenging the Home Affairs Minister, K. Shanmugam, to a debate. Annamalai further criticised the government's use of the Pofma as "increasingly ludicrous" and as a way to "shut down critical views and inconvenient truths".

The Guardian reported that Annamalai was the first activist within Singapore to defy POFMA ; following her public refusal, she was referred to the POFMA Office for Investigation. The Ministry of Home Affairs released a statement accusing Annamalai of "undermining public confidence in public institutions", citing evidence including that she had not appealed the POFMA order. Annamalai responded that she had not appealed on principle due to her needing to first comply with the POFMA order in order to trigger an appeal. Amnesty International described POFMA orders as "nothing but a desperate measure to stifle peaceful freedom of expression and criticism of the authorities".

On 23 April 2026, she was charged for failing to comply with the POFMA directive. Her trial began on 7 October.
