= Internet censorship in Singapore =

Internet censorship in Singapore is carried out by the Infocomm Media Development Authority (IMDA). Internet services provided by the three major Internet service providers (ISPs) are subject to regulation by the MDA, which requires blocking of a symbolic number of websites containing "mass impact objectionable" material, including Playboy, YouPorn and Ashley Madison. The civil service, tertiary institutions and Institute of Technical Education has its own jurisdiction to block websites displaying pornography, information about drugs and online piracy.

== History ==
In 1996, the Singapore government's Singapore Broadcasting Authority (SBA) began monitoring Internet activity and content. Under their guidelines, all ISPs are licensed by the SBA and therefore are subject to the Internet Code of Practice that outlined prohibited online material. Prohibited material was any content or activity that could be seen as "objectionable on the grounds of public interest, public morality, public order, public security, national harmony, or is otherwise prohibited by applicable Singapore laws."

Political and racially sensitive content is frequently censored in Singapore, resulting in a chilling effect on bloggers and academics active on social media. The early to mid-2000s saw the rising popularity of satire websites such as TalkingCock.com and blogs like YawningBread and mrbrown, which offered alternative perspectives on socio-political issues from government-friendly mainstream media. These websites are often under scrutiny and potential targets of censorship.

=== Cases ===
In July 2001, Dr Tan Chong Kee, the founder of Sintercom, was asked to register the website under the nascent Singapore Broadcast Authority Act (now Media Development Authority). Dr Tan chose to shut down Sintercom due to concerns over the ambiguity of the Act.

In July 2006, mrbrown's weekly column in the newspaper Today was terminated after he highlighted the immediate price hikes after the 2006 Singapore general elections. Prime Minister Lee Hsien Loong said mrbrown's column had "hit out wildly at the government and in a very mocking and dismissive sort of tone" and Minister for Information, Communication and the Arts sent a letter saying his article could undermine national stability, and that it was "not the role of journalists or newspapers in Singapore to champion issues, or campaign for or against the government".

In 2012, blogger Alex Au was made by the Attorney General's Chambers and prime minister Lee Hsien Loong to remove his blog posts and apologise several times for various issues, including his questioning of the judicial sentencing of doctor Woffles Wu for a traffic offence, as well as his observations of the saga involving the sale of the ruling party's town councils' software to an IT firm. He was subsequently charged for scandalising the judiciary in 2015 for suggesting judicial partiality towards two constitutional challenges against the Singapore law criminalising sex between men in his blog posts.

In 2015, a video made by the Singapore Democratic Party (SDP), titled "Pappy Washing Powder", was deemed a party political film and thus prohibited under the Films Act.

On 16 September 2021, IMDA instigated the closure of The Online Citizen (TOC) by claiming that TOC provided insufficient fundings breakdown, particularly that they did not receive foreign funding. This is despite TOC's position that "Our site has never received any foreign funding."

== Legislation ==
=== Sedition Act ===
The Sedition Act inherited from the colonial era is also used to charge internet users deemed to have promoted feelings of ill-will and hostility between different races or classes of the population of Singapore. Prime Minister Lee Hsien Loong said the law was necessary to preserve Singapore's racial and religious harmony as ethnic tensions in South-east Asia may give rise to Islamic terrorism. There is continuing debate on whether the use of the Act will have a chilling effect on public debate on the Internet. A 2012 survey from Blackbox Research showed that 75% of the respondents felt that there was no need for legal action against racist online commenters, with 59% saying a formal warning should suffice for a first-time offender, and 16% indicating that it was sufficient to publicly shame them online.

In September 2005, three people were arrested and charged under the Sedition Act for posting racist comments on the Internet. It was the first time the Act was invoked in Singapore for a decade and the first use by the government against individuals.

In 2012, an assistant director at National Trades Union Congress membership department was fired for racist comments on Facebook. In a separate incident, a Chinese student was fined for his abusive comments towards Singaporeans.

In the same year, Singaporean cartoonist Leslie Chew was charged with sedition for alleging official discrimination against the Malay population, on his Facebook page Demon-cratic Singapore. He was charged again for contempt of court for several cartoons questioning Singapore courts for their differential treatment, based on status of nationality and political affiliation of the defendants. The Sedition Act carries a maximum penalty of three years imprisonment and a fine of S$5,000 (US$3,939) if found guilty. However, the government later withdrew the charge. Chew states that he "was interrogated for over 30 hours and placed under island arrest for 3 months and (had) to report for bail extension 6 times during that period".

In other incidents, teenagers and expatriates were arrested by the Singapore police over derogatory, offensive, abusive or threatening comments posted on social media.

Academic Cherian George noted that in most cases, state action to prosecute individuals was instigated by complaints from members of the public, and the offensive content were spread further by those reporting the offence. He argued that internet users should be able to partake in open debates and opinion leaders can make a collective stand against ideas contrary to Singaporean ethos, without the need for the government to intervene and censor or punish.

=== Protection from Online Falsehoods and Manipulation Act (POFMA) ===
In 2017, the Singaporean government said it was considering laws targeting online misinformation and fake news websites. In May 2019, Parliament approved the Protection from Online Falsehoods and Manipulation Act (POFMA), in which ministers are given powers to stop certain falsehoods from spreading through media and internet platforms. For example, articles can be declared to contain falsehoods and the publisher is directed to insert a link to the ministry's reply and 'corrections' - alongside the said article. Readers will still have access to the original article. Only in serious cases will offending articles be required to be taken down immediately.

Individuals and organisations can appeal POFMA directives to the minister issuing them and then the courts, if their appeals are rejected. Google raised concerns that the law could hurt innovation, and rights groups said the government could use it to stifle online discussion. The law came into effect on 2 October 2019, and a few days later, The Online Citizen editor Terry Xu wrote a Facebook post saying the ruling could use POFMA to suppress whistleblower complaints during an election. The Ministry of Communications and Information disputed this post, saying appointed senior civil servants would enforce POFMA during election periods.

=== Broadcasting Act ===
In 2013, Singapore enacted a law requiring licenses for news sites that report regularly on the country, a move that critics of the ruling People’s Action Party see as an attempt to silence online dissent. Sites which satisfy the criteria must also put up a performance bond of $50,000, and are expected to remove content that is perceived by the MDA to be against the public interest, public security, or national harmony within 24 hours. Aside from the online websites of state-owned newspapers, socio-political websites and news providers such as Yahoo Singapore, The Online Citizen, Mothership.sg, The Independent Singapore, The Middle Ground were all approached to register for the class license.

=== Computer Misuse and Cybersecurity Act ===
The Computer Misuse Act (CMA) was introduced in 1993 and its offence provisions are based primarily on the United Kingdom’s 1990 legislation of the same name. In the years since, the government has taken a much tougher stand on Internet-related matters, including censorship. Amendments to the Penal Code in 2006 hold Internet users liable for "causing public mischief", and give the authorities broader powers in regulating Internet content. Following the 2013 Singapore cyberattacks, the Computer Misuse Act was renamed to Computer Misuse and Cybersecurity Act.

=== Copyright law ===
On 8 July 2014, Singapore passed amendments to its existing copyright law. The amendments allow copyright holders to apply for court injunctions, making it compulsory for internet service providers block access to websites that "flagrantly-infringe" intellectual property. The new law took effect in December 2014 and in September 2016, at the request of the Motion Picture Association of America (MPAA), Solarmovie.ph became the first website to be blocked under the amended act. In May 2018, 53 torrent and streaming websites including The Pirate Bay, KickassTorrents and Solarmovie.sc were blocked following an application by the MPAA, after 4 years of discussions.

In September 2022, the Asia Video Industry Association's Coalition Against Piracy (CAP) announced that it had obtained a court order on behalf of its members (including BBC Studios, Discovery Communications, La Liga, the Premier League, and TVB International), requiring 99 online domains to be blocked.

In March 2024, it was reported that the Premier League had successfully obtained a court order requiring internet service providers in Singapore to block access to 25 websites that illegally stream football matches.

=== Online gambling ===
On 7 October 2014, the government passed the "Remote Gambling Act". Under the new law it is an offence, punishable by jail terms and fines, for people to place bets on overseas gambling websites from Singapore. Advertisements for gambling websites are also outlawed. The law took effect on 1 February 2015 when several hundred remote gambling websites were blocked.

On 1 August 2022, the Remote Gambling Act 2014 was repealed and the Gambling Control Act 2022 was enacted, which addressed both in-person and remote gambling within a single consolidated statute.

== Banned websites ==
The IMDA (previously the MDA) maintains a list of more than 100 banned websites. When trying to access a blocked site, visitors are usually greeted by an IMDA or error message depending on the individual ISP and web filtering service. The MDA message is only applicable to public places and office buildings. The Site Blocked message is applicable to most homes.

In 2005, the MDA banned a gay website and fined another website following complaints that the sites contained offensive content. The banned website is said to have promoted promiscuous sexual behaviour and recruited underage boys for sex and nude photography. The government also maintains a "symbolic blocklist" of pornographic websites such as YouPorn and RedTube, and blocks sites that it considered to have "flagrant disrespect of family values, public morality" such as extramarital dating site Ashley Madison.

=== Circumvention software ===
In order to get around the government's control of the Internet, citizens have developed numerous techniques. Software applications for circumventing web-blocking are readily available. Tor is in use through software including xB Browser and Vidalia, and a number of other proxy solutions including Proxify. Freenet is another popular solution available for free download from the Internet. GOM, a browser extension, is circumvention software specifically made for use in Singapore.

=== Institutional blocks ===
The Ministry of Education (MOE) and individual tertiary educational providers impose censorship on individuals using their internet networks, with the help of filtering services for websites. Websites labelled under certain categories, such as criminal skills, pornography, cults/occult, extreme/obscene/violent and gambling were not viewable in these institutions. Socio-political blogger mrbrown's site was briefly blocked by the MOE for being labelled as 'extreme'. It was also reported Nanyang Polytechnic (NYP) had also blacklisted his site. NYP had subscribed to a filter list and the list had later whitelisted his site.

== See also ==
- Censorship in Singapore
- Internet privacy
- Global Internet Freedom Consortium
- Bypassing content-control filters
- Computer and network surveillance
- State-sponsored Internet propaganda
