= Thum Ping Tjin =

Singaporean historian and former national swimmer

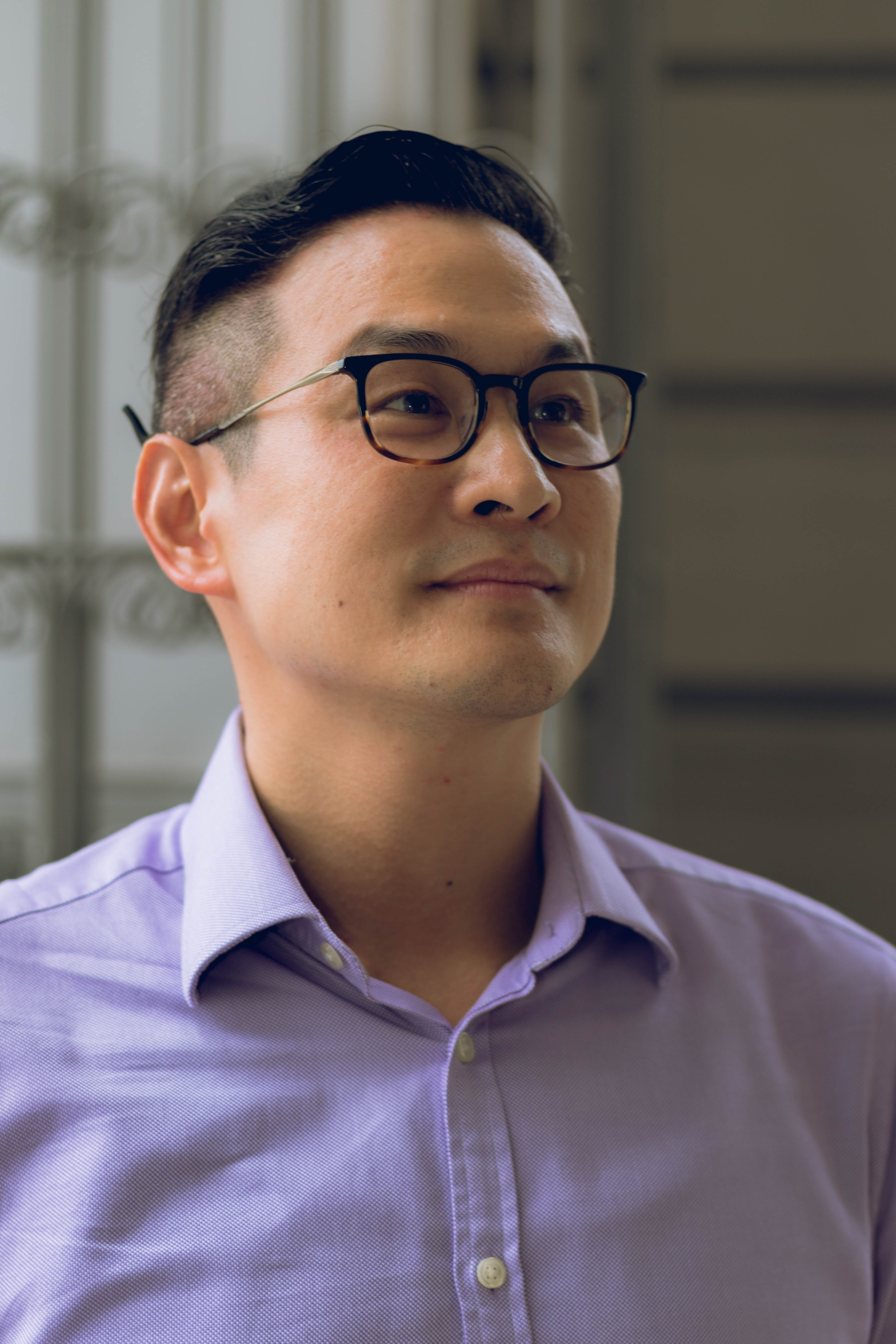
- Thum in 2019
- Born: 17 December 1979 (age 46); Singapore
- Other name: PJ Thum
- Education: Harvard University (BA); University of Oxford (BA, MSt, DPhil

Thum Ping Tjin (Chinese: 覃炳鑫; pinyin: Tán Bǐng Xīn) (born 17 December 1979), also known as PJ Thum, is a Singaporean historian, journalist, podcaster, activist and former swimmer. Thum was a national swimmer who participated in the 1996 Summer Olympics, and was the first Singaporean to swim the English Channel.

He was a research associate and coordinator of Project Southeast Asia, a collective of scholars of Southeast Asian studies at Oxford, and is an academic visitor of the university. He is a founder and manager of online journalism outlet New Naratif and creator of The History of Singapore podcast, which originally ran as a radio show on BFM 89.9. His advocacy has led to a number of legal and public disputes with Singaporean politicians and authorities.

== Early life and education ==
Born on 17 December 1979 in Singapore, Thum received his early education Anglo-Chinese Schools.

He received a BA from Harvard University in 2000, a BA, MSt, and DPhil from the University of Oxford in 2004, 2006, and 2011 respectively.

== Swimming career ==
In 1997, Thum was nominated for the 1997 SEA Games by the Singapore Amateur Swimming Association despite failing to meet the required qualifying time. His nomination was expected as there were six other nominated swimmers who barely failed qualifying for the SEA Games and they were expected to be included into relay teams or for exposure. He was eventually selected for the SEA Games and swam at the 100m and 200m butterfly events.

At the age of 16, Thum represented Singapore in four swim races at the 1996 Summer Olympics in Atlanta, but did not make it past the heats in his individual butterfly or team medley and freestyle events.

During his studies at the University of Oxford, Thum captained the university's swimming team and earned two Blues times. In 2002, he retired from the Singaporean national swimming team but continued to represent Oxford in swimming.

On 6 August 2005, Thum swam solo across the English Channel in 12 hours and 24 minutes, and became the first Singaporean to do so. While preparing for his Channel swim, Thum also set a world record when he swam around the Rock of Gibraltar in 2 hours and 52 minutes.

== Academic and journalism career ==
Thum is a recipient of the Rhodes Scholarship and Commonwealth Scholarship.

From 2012 to 2014, Thum was a research fellow at the Asia Research Institute, National University of Singapore (NUS). Since 2014, Thum has been a research associate at Oxford's Centre for Global History; a fellow of Green Templeton College; and the coordinator of Project Southeast Asia. In 2015, Thum was elected as a Young Global Leader by the World Economic Forum.

In 2017, Thum co-founded independent online journalism outlet New Naratif and has managed it since then.

In March 2018, Al Jazeera interviewed Thum for the documentary The House That Lee Built. where he claimed he had been fired from his research fellowship at National University of Singapore (NUS) after publishing and lecturing about his research which claimed that Singapore's founding Prime Minister Lee Kuan Yew "had lied about his use of detention without trial from the 1960s onward." Thum claimed that as a result of this, a senior staff member at NUS privately informed him that he "would never be able to work in Singapore as an academic... again".

In May 2020, Thum was issued a Protection from Online Falsehoods and Manipulation Act (POFMA) correction order for his statements on POFMA itself. While complying with the order, Thum has said that he will appeal against the POFMA order in the court of Singapore.

=== Select Committee on Deliberate Online Falsehoods dispute ===
In March 2018, in response to a call from the Select Committee on Deliberate Online Falsehoods for submissions, Thum submitted a paper arguing that any legislation by the Singapore Parliament against online falsehood must also apply to the Singapore government. He cited the government's use of detention without trial between 1963 and 1988 during Operation Coldstore and Operation Spectrum. While the government argued that the detainees were part of a communist plot or Marxist conspiracy to subvert the state, Thum claimed that the government has never produced any evidence to substantiate its claims nor have any detainees been brought to trial on the charges they were detained under. Thum argued that these justifications were false claims made by politicians of the ruling People's Action Party (PAP) for the purpose of political gain.

On 29 March, the last day of the sitting of the Select Committee, Law and Home Affairs Minister K. Shanmugam questioned Thum about the veracity of a paper he published in 2013 regarding Operation Coldstore and the formation of Malaysia, and questioned his integrity as a historian. Thum countered that his paper had been peer-reviewed and that no historian had stepped forward to contradict the central thrust of his work. Channel NewsAsia and The Straits Times reported that Thum conceded that some elements of this paper could have been worded better. However, Thum later claimed that the reports took his words out of context, arguing that "at no point did I accept that any part of my article was inaccurate or misleading".

Civil activists groups Community Action Network, Function 8, and Maruah, as well as activists Kirsten Han, Terry Xu, and Thum himself, criticised the open hearings, accusing the Select Committee of failing to adhere to its own terms of reference, and claiming the hearings had not been conducted in an open or consultative manner.

A letter signed by 170 academics was submitted to the Select Committee's Chairman, Charles Chong, criticising the hearing as an attempt to attack and destroy Thum's credibility and discredit his research, with the effect of stifling the freedom of expression and academic freedom in Singapore. A letter from six of Thum's colleagues at the University of Oxford's Project Southeast Asia also expressed concerns about how Thum was treated at the hearing and defended Thum's research, saying it had "already met the rigorous standards of examination at Oxford and peer review by fellow historical experts on the region". The letter also expressed concerns about the "implications for academic freedom, and for freedom of expression in Singapore", saying that the hearing "appears designed to intimidate those who seek to publish the truth".

In response, Chong argued that Thum had chosen to make a political point in his written submission to the Select Committee, and must expect to be questioned about his claims. He also characterised Thum's submission as a "political piece" rather than an "academic dissertation". Chong also accused Thum of having "engineered" the open letter in support of himself, calling it a "coordinated attempt, with foreign actors involved, to try to influence and subvert our parliamentary processes". Philip Kreager, a colleague at Project Southeast Asia, called Chong's statement "clearly preposterous" and accused Chong of imagining a "conspiracy".

=== ACRA registration controversy ===
On 11 April 2018, the Accounting and Corporate Regulatory Authority (ACRA) notified Thum and Kirsten Han that their 18 February 2018 application to register a private company "OSEA Private Limited" was rejected. ACRA released a press statement which stated that the company was "clearly political in nature" and contrary to Singapore's national interests. According to The Straits Times, "this is the first publicised case of a proposed incorporated entity having its application rejected due to foreign funding for domestic political activities."

OSEA was to be a wholly owned subsidiary of Observatory Southeast Asia Limited (OSEA-UK). ACRA noted that, in his application, Thum had stated that OSEA-UK has received a US$75,000 grant from the Foundation Open Societies Institute (FOSI), a charitable foundation closely associated with the Open Society Foundations (OSF), which was founded by George Soros. In their press release, ACRA argued that "OSF, founded and led by George Soros, was expressly established to pursue a political agenda the world over, and has a history of involvement in the domestic politics of sovereign countries". ACRA cited how the OSEA application proposed to organise "Democracy Classroom" sessions, workshops and events in Singapore.

On 1 May 2018, Select Committee chairman Charles Chong noted that Thum and Philip Kreager – both trustees of Oxford's Project Southeast Asia – were directors of OSEA-UK on the British government's company registry.

=== Meeting with Mahathir Mohamad ===
On 30 August 2018, Thum, Tan Wah Piow and others met Mahathir Mohamad, the Prime Minister of Malaysia, and asked him to take a lead role in promoting democracy in Southeast Asia. This move received criticism in Singapore, including from Member of Parliament Seah Kian Peng and Law and Home Affairs Minister K. Shanmugam, who said that to invite "a foreign politician, to intervene in our domestic politics ... is an absolute no no". Thum by saying "any notion that I am a traitor to my country is ridiculous and unfounded".

Thum, Kirsten Han and Jolovan Wham, who also met Mahathir, sent letters of complaint to Lee Hsien Loong, the Prime Minister of Singapore, denouncing the conduct of Seah, who is also a member of the Select Committee on Deliberate Online Falsehoods, for making accusations without substantiation. The trio also urged Charles Chong, the chairperson of the Select Committee, to "take leadership in promoting responsible behaviour and engaging in evidence-based discussion".

The Ministry of Home Affairs replied to Thum's letter: "We can have vigorous debates within Singapore about our own affairs. But you cross a red line when you invite foreign powers or foreign leaders into Singapore politics."

=== Police investigation into New Naratif ===
After the 2020 general elections, the Election Department of Singapore filed a police report against New Naratif for allegedly publishing paid election ads, which would be illegal under Singaporean law. New Naratif in response accused the government of intimidation and abusing the Parliamentary Elections Act. Thum, as the general manager, was questioned by police for several hours, and his phone and laptop were seized.

== Personal life ==
Thum is married to a Filipino academic, Sol Iglesias.

== Bibliography ==
- We Singaporeans are very Concerned: The Citizens’ Agenda 2025, (ed.). Singapore: Pagesetters, 2025.
- Nationalism and Decolonisation in Singapore: The Malayan Generation, 1953 – 1963. London: Routledge, 2024.
- Living with Myths in Singapore (with Loh Kah Seng and Jack Chia, eds.). Singapore: Ethos Books, 2017.
- “The Malayan vision of Lim Chin Siong: Unity, Non-Violence, and Popular Sovereignty,“ Inter-Asia Cultural Studies Vol 18, No 3 (2017).
- ‘The Fundamental Issue is Anti-colonialism, Not Merger’: Singapore’s “Progressive Left”, Operation Coldstore, and the Creation of Malaysia. ARI Working Paper Series 211.
- “The New Normal is the Old Normal: Lessons from Singapore’s History of Dissent,” in Donald Low (ed.), Hard Choices: Challenging the Singapore Consensus. Singapore: NUS Press (2014).
- “Flesh and Bone Reunited As One Body: Singapore’s Chinese-Speaking and their Perspectives on Merger”, in Hong, Lysa and Poh, Soo Kai (eds.), The 1963 Operation Coldstore in Singapore: Commemorating 50 Years. Kuala Lumpur: Strategic Institute of Research and Development (2013).
- “Flesh and Bone Reunited As One Body: Singapore’s Chinese-Speaking and their Perspectives on Merger”, Chinese Southern Diaspora Studies Vol 5 (2011 – 12).
- “The Politics of Southeast Asian History,” IIAS Newsletter 62 (Winter 2012).
- “The Limitations of Monolingual History,” in Tarling, Nicholas (ed.), Studying Singapore’s Past: C.M. Turnbull and the History of Modern Singapore. Singapore: NUS Press, 2012: 1 – 18.
- “Constance Mary Turnbull, 1927-2008,” in Tarling, Nicholas (ed.), Studying Singapore’s Past: C.M. Turnbull and the History of Modern Singapore. Singapore: NUS Press, 2012: 98 – 120.
- “‘Living Buddha’: Chinese perspectives on David Marshall and his government, 1955-56”, Indonesia and the Malay World, Vol 38, Issue 113 (July 2011).
- “Chinese newspapers in Singapore, 1945 – 1963: Mediators of elite and popular tastes in culture and politics”, Journal of the Malaysian Branch of the Royal Asiatic Society, Vol 83, Part 1 (June 2010).
