= Anti-social Media Bill (Nigeria) =

Anti-social Media Bill was introduced by the Senate of the Federal Republic of Nigeria on 5 November 2019 to criminalise the use of the social media in peddling false or malicious information. The original title of the bill is Protection from Internet Falsehood and Manipulations Bill 2019. It was sponsored by Senator Mohammed Sani Musa from the largely conservative northern Nigeria. After the bill passed second reading on the floor of the Nigeria Senate and its details were made public, information emerged on the social media accusing the sponsor of the bill of plagiarising a similar law in Singapore which is at the bottom of global ranking in the freedom of speech and of the press. But the senator denied that he plagiarised Singaporean law.

== Opposition to the bill ==
Angry reactions trailed the introduction of the bill, and a number of civil society organisations, human rights activists, and Nigerian citizens unanimously opposed the bill. International rights group, Amnesty International and Human Rights Watch condemned the proposed legislation saying it is aimed at gagging freedom of speech which is a universal right in a country of over two hundred million people.

Opposition political parties are very critical of the bill and accused the government of attempting to strip bare, Nigerian citizens of their rights to free speech and destroying same social media on whose power and influence the ruling All Progressives Congress, APC came to power in 2015. Nigeria Information Minister, Lai Mohammed has been at the center of public criticism because he is suspected to be the brain behind the proposed act. Lai was a former spokesman of then opposition All Progressives Congress.

A "Stop the Social Media Bill! You can no longer take our rights from us" online petition campaign to force the Nigeria parliament to drop the bill received over 90,000 signatures within 24 hours. In November 2019, after the bill passed second reading in the senate, Akon Eyakenyi, a senator from Akwa Ibom State publicly said he would resist the bill.

=== Support for the bill ===
Those who support the proposed act especially Senators have often argued that the law would help curtail hate speech. President Muhammad Buhari who is seen as a beneficiary of the influence and power of the social media and free speech has been mute about it. But the president's senior aides and family members have publicly spoken in support of the bill. In November 2019, the wife of the president, Aisha Buhari, told a gathering at the Nigeria's National Mosque in the capital, Abuja that if China with over one billion people could regulate the social media, Nigeria should do same. But Nigerians reacted saying Nigeria is not a one-party communist state like China. Days later, a daughter to the president, Zahra Indimi told a gathering of young people in Abuja that social media had become a potent weapon for bullying those they thought were doing better than them in terms of social class and called for a critical regulation.

== Key provisions of the bill ==
=== Title ===
Protection from Internet Falsehoods, Manipulations and Other Related Matters Bill 2019.

=== Explanatory memorandum ===
This Act is to prevent Falsehoods and Manipulations in Internet transmission and correspondences in Nigeria.

To suppress falsehoods and manipulations and counter the effects of such communications and transmissions and to sanction offenders with a view to encouraging and enhancing transparency by Social Media Platforms using the internet correspondences.

=== Objectives ===
- One objective of the bill is to prevent the transmission of false statements or declaration of facts in Nigeria.
- Another objective of the bill is to end the financing of online mediums that transmit false statements.
- Measures will be taken to detect and control inauthentic behaviour and misuse of online accounts (parody accounts).
- When paid content is posted towards a political end, there will be measures to ensure the poster discloses such information.
- There will be sanction for offenders.

=== Transmission of false statement ===
According to the bill, a person must not:

- Transmit a statement that is false or,
- Transmit a statement that might:
- i. Affect the security or any part of Nigeria. ii. Affect public health, public safety or public finance. iii. Affect Nigeria's relationship with other countries. iv. influence the outcome of an election to any office in a general election. v. Cause enmity or hatred towards a person or group of persons.
- Anyone guilty of the above is liable to a fine of N300,000 or three years' imprisonment or both (for individual); and a fine not exceeding ten million naira (for corporate organisations).
- Same punishment applies for fake online accounts that transmit statements listed above.

=== Parody accounts ===
- The bill says a person shall not open an account to transmit false statement.
- Anyone found guilty will be fined N200,000 or three years' imprisonment or both (for an individual) or five million naira (for corporate organisations).
- If such accounts transmit a statement that will affect security or influence the outcome of an election, such a person will be fined N300,000 or three years' imprisonment or both.
- If a person receives payment or reward to help another to transmit false statements knowingly, he/she is liable to a fine of N150,000 or three years' imprisonment or both. If a person receives payment or reward to help another to transmit a statement affects security or influence the outcome of an election, the fine is N300,000 or three years' imprisonment or both (for individual) and ten million naira for organisations.

=== Declaration ===
According to the bill, a law enforcement department can issue a "declaration" to offenders. And this declaration will be issued even if the "false statement" has been corrected or pulled down.

- The offender will be required to publish a "correction notice" in a specified newspaper, online location or other printed publication of Nigeria.
- Failure to comply, a person is liable to N200,000 or 12 months' imprisonment or both (for individual) and five million naira for organisations.

=== Access blocking order ===
The bill says the law enforcement department will also issue an access blocking order to offenders.

- The law enforcement department may direct the NCC to order the internet access service provider to disable access by users in Nigeria to the online location and the NCC must give the internet access service provider an access blocking order.
- An internet access service provider that does not comply with any access blocking order is liable on conviction to a fine not exceeding ten million naira for each day during any part of which that order is not fully complied with, up to a total of five million naira.
