= Protection from Online Falsehoods and Manipulation Act 2019 =

Statute of the Parliament of Singapore

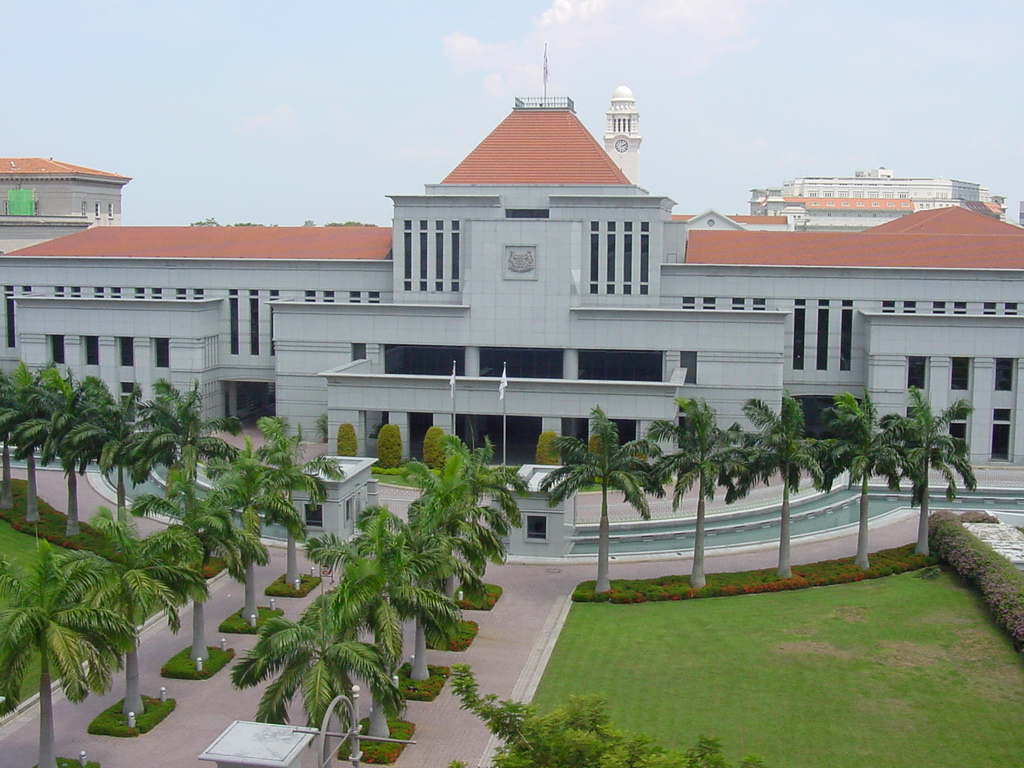

Parliament of Singapore
- Long title: An Act to prevent the electronic communication in Singapore of false statements of fact, to suppress support for and counteract the effects of such communication, to safeguard against the use of online accounts for such communication and for information manipulation, to enable measures to be taken to enhance transparency of online political advertisements, and for related matters.
- Citation: Act 18 of 2019
- Considered by: Parliament of Singapore
- Passed by: President Halimah Yacob
- Passed: 8 May 2019
- Enacted: 3 June 2019
- Commenced: 2 October 2019

Legislative history
- Bill title: Protection from Online Falsehoods and Manipulation Bill
- Bill citation: Bill 10 of 2019
- Introduced by: Mr Edwin Tong Chun Fai (Senior Minister of State for Law)
- Introduced: 1 April 2019
- First reading: 1 April 2019
- Second reading: 8 May 2019
- Third reading: 8 May 2019
- Committee report: Report of the Select Committee on Deliberate Online Falsehood
- Status: In force

The Protection from Online Falsehoods and Manipulation Act 2019, commonly abbreviated as POFMA, is a statute of the Parliament of Singapore that enables authorities to tackle the spread of what the Singaporean government characterises as fake news or false information.

The law is designed specifically to allow authorities to respond to fake news or false information through a graduated process of enforcing links to fact-checking statements, censorship of website or assets on social media platforms, and criminal charges. While the law has existed in similar capacities in various other countries, it received criticism by some opposition politicians, human rights groups, journalists and academics.

== History ==
On 3 April 2017, Minister of Law and Home Affairs K Shanmugam called for a review of existing laws to combat fake news. He cited online portals such as The Real Singapore which published an article falsely claiming that a commotion between Thaipusam participants and the police was sparked by complaints from a Filipino family, the States Times Review which mocked former President S. R. Nathan with an article claiming near-zero turnout for his funeral, and All Singapore Stuff which falsely reported eye-witness accounts of a collapsed HDB roof at Punggol Waterway Terraces, subsequently wasting SPF and SCDF resources during the follow-up investigation. The Minister claimed that fake news, when not debunked, can quickly cause harm to Singaporeans, panic to public, waste emergency resources, and damage reputations of businesses and people. He also claimed that "nasty" people seek to profit from fake news and that foreign agencies and foreign governments seek to destabilise the government through fake news.

On 10 January 2018, 80 MPs present voted unanimously in Parliament to appoint a Select Committee of eight PAP MPs, one opposition MP and one NMP to study and report on the problem of deliberate online falsehoods and recommend strategies to deal with them. The Select Committee convened public hearings from 14 to 29 March 2018, lasting eight days in total, where 79 individuals and organisations were invited to testify.

On 1 April 2019, the Protection from Online Falsehoods and Manipulation (POFMA) Bill was tabled in parliament for first reading. The Ministry of Law stated that the legislation seeks to protect the society from deliberate online falsehoods created by malicious actors by targeting falsehoods, not opinions and criticisms, nor satire or parody. It defines a falsehood as a statement of fact that is false or misleading. After concerns were raised about the Bill's scope, ministers gave reassurances that the bill will not affect free speech. The Bill was passed with a 72–9 vote, with all Workers Party (WP) MPs voting against it, on 8 May 2019 after a two-day debate.

The POFMA came into effect on 2 October 2019, with the Infocomm Media Development Authority (IMDA) being the agency administering Act through a dedicated office. Subsidiary legislation is also laid out in the Act detailing how the Act will work, including court challenges that take nine days at maximum and cost as little as $200.

On 7 October, in a written parliamentary reply to a question about correction notice not being issued for a proven falsehood that an Israeli delegation to Singapore, comprising representatives from the Israel Prison Service and National Security Ministry, had discussed about death penalty in a meeting with their local counterparts, K. Shanmugam stated that there is a "public interest threshold" to be met.

== Purpose ==
There were concerns that the Act would enable authorities to suppress criticism and dissent. Section 2(2)(b) defines a false statement as "if it is false or misleading, whether wholly or in part, and whether on its own or in the context in which it appears". Satire, parody, opinions and criticisms are expressively not covered by the POFMA Act.

Section 3 of the Act covers any statements that are made available to one or more end-users in Singapore via the internet, SMS or MMS. The platforms include social media platforms, such as Facebook, Twitter, Google, and other online closed groups such private chat groups and social media groups.

The purpose of the Act, as outlined in section 5, is to:

1. to prevent the communication of false statements of fact in Singapore and to enable measures to be taken to counteract the effects of such communication;
2. to suppress the financing, promotion and other support of online locations that repeatedly communicate false statements of fact in Singapore;
3. to enable measures to be taken to detect, control and safeguard against coordinated inauthentic behaviour and other misuses of online accounts and bots; and
4. to enable measures to be taken to enhance disclosure of information concerning paid content directed towards a political end.

== Prohibited activities and penalties ==
Part 2 of the POFMA Act criminalises the communication of false statements of facts in Singapore through Section 7 even if the person communicating it is not in Singapore, and that the false statement is detrimental to "the security of Singapore", "public health, public safety, public tranquillity or public finances", friendly international relations with other countries, influence the outcome of parliamentary and presidential elections or referendums, incite tension between different groups of people, or diminish public confidence in the public service or general governance of Singapore.

Through Section 8, the creation and usage of bots or enabling another person to utilise, with the intention to communicate a false statement of fact in Singapore is prohibited. Section 9 prohibits soliciting, receiving, or agreeing to receive a benefit for providing a service which the person knows is or will be used to communicate a false statement of fact in Singapore, if the service is in fact used in the communication. However, Section 9 is not applicable on intermediary services such as internet intermediaries, telecommunications services, public internet access services, or a computing resource service.

Contravening these prohibitions may see fines and/or prison terms imposed on the offender.

== Correction mechanism ==
A Correction Direction may be sent out to a communicator of the false statement, instructing the person to place a notice stating that the statement was found to be false and a correction of the false statement. The placement location of this notice may also be specified at an online location or in close proximity of the false statement, or in newspapers. A Stop Communication Direction may be issued as well, instructing the person to disable access of the false statement to end-users in Singapore by a specific time.

Concurrently, a Targeted Correction Direction may be sent to internet intermediaries and providers of mass media services to communicate the correction notice in response to a false statement to end-users in Singapore. A Disabling Direction may be issued to disable access an online location to end-users in Singapore. A General Correction Direction may be sent to instruct publication of correction notice on the relevant platforms.

If an online location has three or more false statements, it may be tagged as a declared online location. A declared online location will need to place a notice of such declaration for up to two years, and are not able to receive any financial support.

Non-compliance of these Directions may accrue fines and/or prison terms by the offender. An Access Block Order on online location may be issued in event of noncompliance as well to instruct Infocomm Media Development Authority (IMDA) to order internet service providers to disable access to the online location.

To deal with fake accounts and bots, an Account Restriction Direction may be issued to order an internet intermediary to shut down any fake accounts and bots on its platforms and/or prevent the accounts' owners from interacting with end-users in Singapore.

Government ministers will issue instructions to correct falsehoods through an appointed Competent Authority, as laid out in Section 6. The Ministry of Communications and Information established a POFMA Office within IMDA to administer the law, on basis that IMDA has relevant connections to the tech industry and experience in administering the Broadcasting Act and other similar content regulation policies. The POFMA Office maintains a registry of Declared Online Locations and also establishes a mechanism for the general public to apply for a relevant Direction or Declaration to the relevant ministry. All applications to vary or cancel any Directions or Declaration must be made within 14 days to the High Court.

=== 5-step framework in setting aside orders in a court ===
A 2021 landmark judgement saw the Court of Appeal formulating a 5-step framework for a court to follow in deciding to set aside the correction orders or directions in future cases.

1. The court must identify which statement that the minister has identified as false and to be targeted by their correction direction.
2. The court should determine if the subject material, which contains the subject statement which was identified by the minister to be false, is understood in accordance to the minister's intended meaning. The Court has to consider if the minister's interpretation is reasonable. If the Court does not find that the subject material contains the subject statement identified by the minister, the correct direction may be set aside.
3. The court should determine if the identified subject statement is a 'statement of fact' as defined in the Act.
4. The court should determine if the subject statement is a 'false' statement as explained in the Act.
5. The court should determine if the subject statement 'has been/is being communicated in Singapore' as defined in the Act.

== Notable uses ==
The first Correction Direction was issued to Brad Bowyer, a Progress Singapore Party member, to place a correction notice on statements of falsehoods which implied that the Government controls Temasek's and GIC's commercial decisions, that billions of dollars in investments were wasted on the canned Amaravati city project, and Salt Bae's parent company, which received an investment from Temasek, was debt-laden. The commercial decisions made by Temasek and GIC are asserted to be independent, while only millions of dollars was sunk into the city project, and the investment made in D.ream International BV, and not in one of D.ream International BV's shareholders called Doğuş Holding that was reportedly in difficulties. Bowyer placed the correction notice when he received the Direction. The PSP subsequently protested, stating that "the Act falls short of the values of transparency, independence and accountability" and that it could be used by ministers to declare a piece of news to be "falsehood, without requiring any justification, criteria or standards". Ministry of Law refuted stating that the reasons to use the law were stated clearly, and that the correction notice does not curtail one's freedom of speech, and will instead help end-users make up their mind as to what is the truth.

In November 2019, under the act, the government of Singapore requested Facebook to add a correction notice to a post from Alex Tan's States Times Review after Tan refused to add the notice himself. The post included allegations involving election rigging, which Singapore claimed were false. The State Times Review Facebook page was blocked in Singapore 17 February 2020 after Tan refused to update posts relating to COVID-19 as false and add a declared online location notice to the page. Facebook was ordered to do so under POFMA and said they found the block "deeply concern[ing]". Tan created additional accounts to circumvent the block. Legal action cannot be taken against Tan as he lives outside of Singapore's jurisdiction.

In 2024, Kokila Annamalai became the first human rights activist within Singapore to publicly defy a POFMA order.

=== Combating misinformation about COVID-19 pandemic ===
During the COVID-19 pandemic, the Act was utilised in several instances to fight misinformation about the pandemic situation in Singapore.

On 27 January 2020, HardwareZone forum was issued a general correction direction over a false claim of a man from Singapore having died from the COVID-19 virus. The forum post containing the false claim was taken down soon after it was posted, however the Singapore-based online forum still had to display a notice to all of their end-users on the false claim in accordance with the general correction direction.

The Ministry of Communications and Information lifted the temporary exemption of social media platforms, search engines and Internet intermediaries from complying with POFMA. These platforms were required to comply with general correction directions issued from 31 January 2020. The exemptions initially applied when the law first took effect.

On 20 May 2021, on instructions from Ministry of Health, a general correction direction was issue to Twitter, Facebook, and HardwareZone forum over an allegation of an unknown 'Singapore variant' of the virus being at risk of spreading to India.

=== Test of sovereign immunity and extraterritoriality of the law in Malaysia ===
On 15 January 2020, Lawyers for Liberty (LFL), a Malaysian-based non-governmental organisation, claimed that the execution method at Changi Prison, hanging, was brutal and unlawful and included "kicks to snap prisoners' necks in the event of the rope breaking during a hanging" and claimed to receive information from a prison officer. Singapore authorities responded that the claims were "baseless falsehoods", and that the executions were conducted "in strict compliance of the law". The Ministry of Home Affairs (MHA) directed the POFMA Office to issue directives to LFL and several other websites, The Online Citizen, Yahoo News, and journalist Kirsten Han to carry correction notices on their articles or posts about the matter. LFL refused and demanded for the directives to be withdrawn, claiming a breach of international law. As such, LFL's website was banned from being accessed from Singapore.

LFL would file two lawsuits in the same year, 2020. The first against Malaysian government, to seek a declaration that LFL could not be subjected to any processes within Malaysia with regards to POFMA Act; and the second against Singapore's MHA minister, K. Shanmugam, that the correction order cannot be enforced against itself in Singapore. With allowance from Malaysian High Court, the Malaysian Attorney-General intervened in the second suit. Both Malaysian government and Attorney-General successfully struck out both lawsuits on grounds that Malaysia recognised Singapore a foreign sovereign and thus the latter has sovereign immunity in the correction direction and Shanmugan's decisions on 10 June 2021. This however was overturned on appeal on 20 July 2022. On 28 June 2024, after a five-member Court of Appeal convened, it was determined that LFL cannot sue the Singaporean government over the issuance of the correction order in Malaysia due to sovereign immunity, but would allow the matter of extraterritoriality of POFMA Act be heard in the High Court in relation to Malaysian citizen's constitutional right to freedom of expression.

=== During the 2020 Singaporean general election ===
In July 2020, during the campaigning period of the general election, five correction directions were issued to the National University of Singapore Society, CNA, The Online Citizen and New Naratif by the Ministry of Health (MOH) and Ministry of Manpower (MOM) jointly, taking issue on the following statements made, which the ministries said to be false:

1. MOM's email advisory to employers on testing of migrant workers was made without the advice from public health medical professionals
2. MOM's advisory stated that employers would lose their work pass privileges if they brought their workers for Covid-19 testing
3. MOM actively discouraged the testing of workers

In response to his interview's correction by POFMA, the Singapore Democratic Party's chairman Professor Paul Tambyah retroactively claimed that his point in the original interview was who signed a circular email rather than suggesting the email's content was not distributed without the advice of medical professionals.

=== 2021 landmark judgement by the Court of Appeal ===
The Singapore Democratic Party (SDP) and The Online Citizen (TOC) were the first few parties to challenge some of the Directions set upon them. On 14 December 2019, SDP was directed by Ministry of Manpower (MOM) to correct two Facebook posts and an article on its website, in which SDP advanced a position that there was a rising trend of retrenchment among the Singaporean professionals, managers, executives and technicians (PMETS). SDP filed an appeal to MOM, however was rejected. SDP then chose to apply to the High Court to cancel the order that is set against it. On 22 January 2020, TOC, as well as Singaporean activist Kirsten Han and Yahoo! Singapore were issued with correction orders by Ministry of Home Affairs (MHA) over the content they had posted on their platforms over the allegations of "Singapore prison officers carry[ing] out brutal execution method" by Malaysian-based Lawyers For Liberty. Similarly to SDP's case, TOC filed an appeal to MHA, however was rejected. TOC then chose to apply to the High Court to cancel the order set against it.

Both cases were heard separately, by different High Court judges, but had the same outcome: their appeals to cancel the orders were denied. However, in both cases, the judgement on the burden of proof differed. Justice Ang Cheng Hock in SDP's case found that the burden of proof is to be borne by the minister, while Justice Belinda Ang in TOC's case found that the burden of proof is to be borne by the party making the statements that were being corrected.

Both SDP and TOC decided to file their appeals to the apex court, Court of Appeal. Due to the closeness in the timing of the cases, and of the legal matters to be heard, both cases were heard together in the Court of Appeal. However, in September 2020, a panel of senior judges in the Court of Appeal reserved judgement on several legal issues, one of them is whether the burden of proof fell on the statement maker or the minister.

On 8 October 2021, the rulings by the Court of Appeal was delivered. Among the matters heard were the constitutionality of POFMA; the burden of proof falls on which party; on whether reporting a falsehood counts as making a falsehood. It also delivered a five-step legal framework which courts can use to apply on whether to set aside a correction order in the future. It also put a finality on the statements made by SDP and TOC, as to whether they were fake or not.

The panel of judges found that POFMA was not unconstitutional. It also found that a part of the SDP's orders was invalid while the rest of SDP's statements and TOC's were false. However, on the same day of the release of the judgement, MOM issued a new Correction Order to cover the invalidated portion of the previous Correction Order.

== Criticism ==
=== Local criticism ===
During the parliamentary debate over the proposed Act, Pritam Singh of the Workers' Party, who was a member of the 13th Parliament of Singapore representing Aljunied GRC, criticised the legislation, saying that "ministers should not be the deciding body on what constitutes false matters". Pritam argued that the Government should still be able to take down false claims, however the courts should be the avenue which such orders can be legitimise, as an understanding of legislation was that it gave "broad latitude to the executive to clamp down on what is misleading but which may not be false per se". Pritam's fellow member, Sylvia Lim commented that the process to appeal against the orders could be "very onerous" to the applicants due to "information asymmetry between the Government and individuals".

An editorial on The Online Citizen questioned why POFMA was not applied on foreign news outlets where there are false statements, and diplomats were responding with lengthy letters to disagree with the false statements instead. Dozens of journalists signed an open letter stating "By failing to distinguish between a malicious falsehood and a genuine mistake, the proposed legislation places an unnecessarily onerous burden on even journalists acting in good faith".

=== International criticism ===
The Act was criticised by human rights groups and free speech organisations. Reporters Without Borders claimed that the bill was "terrible", stating that it is "totalitarian" and used as a tool to regulate public debates. Reuters states that the Act "ensnares" government critics. Two years after the Act was passed, the International Commission of Jurists called for the government to repeal or at least make amends to the Act, so that it does not "arbitrarily restrict the right to freedom of expression and information online".

After having to remove several posts under the Act, Facebook stated that it was "concerned" by the "broad powers" the act provides the Singaporean government with.

Amnesty International described Pofma orders as "nothing but a desperate measure to stifle peaceful freedom of expression and criticism of the authorities".

== Media Literacy Council apology ==
In 2020, the Media Literacy Council (MLC), an outreach programme under IMDA which promotes digital and media literacy, included satire as an "example" of fake news in one of its Facebook posts and info-graphics on 5 September 2019. The MLC took down the post and issued an apology for the confusion on 8 September, saying that they would review their materials. Minister Shanmugam attributed it as a mistake or inaccuracy being made by the MLC, reassuring that satire does not count as fake news.

== See also ==
=== Singapore related ===
- Internet censorship in Singapore
- Select Committee on Deliberate Online Falsehoods, a select committee which led to the recommendation of this law

=== Fake news related ===
- Fake news
- Fake news in India
- Fake news in the United States
- Indian WhatsApp lynchings

=== Other legislative attempts or laws ===
- Anti-social Media Bill (Nigeria)
- Network Enforcement Act (Germany)
- Digital Services Act (Europe)

=== Philosophy ===
- Fact–value distinction – Distinction between what is and what ought to be
- Is–ought problem – Philosophical problem articulated by David Hume
