= Philip Chan (businessman) =

Singaporean businessman (born 1964)

Phillip Chan
- Born: Philip Chan Man Ping; 1964 (age 61–62); Hong Kong
- Citizenship: Hong Kong (1964-1993) Singapore (1993-present)
- Occupations: Businessman; Former patron of the Kampong Chai Chee
- Children: 2

Philip Chan Man Ping (born 1964) is a naturalized Singaporean businessman. Born in Hong Kong, Chan is the fifth son in a Teochew family.

== Career ==
Chan began his career in sales, before co-founding a business with his two brothers, overseeing sales and shipping operations in Vietnam, Hong Kong, and China.

He also served as the managing director of Wen Way Investments and Mutual Benefits Realty, and as the CEO of C&H Properties. Additionally, he founded China Link Education Consultancy.

Chan was a patron of the Kampong Chai Chee Citizens’ Consultative Committee and the Bukit Timah Community Club management committee. He stepped down from these roles following his designation as a "politically significant person" by Singapore's Ministry of Home Affairs, under the country's foreign interference laws.

In October 2019, he was given a warning for organising an illegal protest against the Hong Kong Extradition Bill.

== Allegations of China influence ==
On 2 February 2024, Singapore’s Ministry of Home Affairs designated Chan as a “politically significant person" under the Foreign Interference (Countermeasures) Act 2021 (FICA), citing concerns over his potential susceptibility to foreign influence. He officially became the first person designated as a politically significant person under FICA on 26 February 2024. Journalists noted that the designation was interpreted as reflecting government efforts to counter potential foreign influence, particularly from Chinese sources, in domestic affairs. The FICA notice was officially issued to him on 26 February 2024.

== Personal life ==
Chan immigrated to Singapore in 1990, and became a naturalized citizen in 1993. He is married to a Singaporean, and they have two sons.
