= Alex Tan =

Singaporean politician

Alex Tan Zhixiang 陈智祥 (Chén Zhì Xiáng)
- Political party: Reform Party; Singapore People's Party

Alex Tan Zhixiang (simplified Chinese: 陈智祥; traditional Chinese: 陳智祥; pinyin: Chén Zhì Xiáng; born 1987 or 1988 (age 37–38)) is a Singaporean politician and political dissident. He contributed to and owned online outlets critical of the government of Singapore. The government of Singapore labeled this coverage as fake news and blocked access to his Facebook pages under the Protection from Online Falsehoods and Manipulation Act (POFMA).

== Online activities ==
Tan was an editor and one of the contributors and founders of the sociopolitical website The Real Singapore (TRS). On 6 February 2015, two editors of TRS, Ai Takagi and Robin Yang Kai Heng, were arrested under Singapore's Sedition Act. Tan moved to Australia soon after and The Real Singapore was shut down on 3 May 2015 by order of the Media Development Authority of Singapore. He subsequently started a new website called Straits Times Review, later changing its name to States Times Review after Singapore Press Holdings stated that it would explore legal recourse for infringing on its newspaper, The Straits Times' trademark.

Invoking POFMA, the government of Singapore requested Facebook mark a States Times Review post with a "correction notice" in November 2019. The State Times Review Facebook page was blocked on 17 February 2020 from access by Singapore users after Tan refused to update posts relating to COVID-19 as false and add a notice declaring "a history communicating falsehoods" to the page. Facebook was ordered to do so under POFMA and said they found the block "deeply concern[ing]". Tan created additional accounts to circumvent the block. Legal action could not be taken against Tan as he lives outside of Singapore's jurisdiction. In May 2020, the Facebook pages of Tan and his outlet Singapore States Times’ were classified as "Declared Online Locations" under POFMA.

=== Allegations of Singapore government's role in 1MDB scandal ===
On 5 November 2018, States Times Review, published an article alleging that Malaysia had signed several unfair agreements with Singapore in exchange for Singapore banks’ assistance in laundering the Malaysian state fund 1Malaysia Development Berhad (1MDB) and implicated Singapore's Prime Minister Lee Hsien Loong in the alleged crime. The article, citing the Sarawak Report (SR), also claimed that SR editor Clare RewCastle-Brown had said in an interview with Malaysian media that Singapore, along with the United States and Switzerland, were key investigation targets in the 1MDB scandal.

In response, SR called the interview "erroneous" and disowned the claim, saying that no such interview was given, nor that it had any information on Singapore becoming a target in the 1MDB investigation, and that RewCastle-Brown had been misquoted in the piece. The Singapore High Commission in Malaysia also released a statement to the Malaysian government and people that "categorically stated that (the) article is fake news and clearly libellous." Singapore's central bank, the Monetary Authority of Singapore filed a police report against Tan for "impugning its integrity". The Info-communications Media Development Authority (IMDA) requested that Facebook remove the article but was rejected, with Facebook's spokesperson saying it "does not have a policy that prohibits alleged falsehoods, apart from in situations where this content has the potential to contribute to imminent violence or physical harm". Tan was also ordered by the Singapore authorities to remove the article. He initially refused, criticizing the "false charges of 'fake news' and 'criminal defamation' laid by the Singapore dictatorship", but eventually shut down the States Times Review's Facebook page "of his own volition".

== Political career ==
Tan contested in the 2011 Singaporean general election, under the Reform Party's banner for Ang Mo Kio Group Representation Constituency (GRC), running against People's Action Party's Lee Hsien Loong who was the incumbent Prime Minister. Tan was originally with Singapore People's Party, but joined the Reform Party for the elections after internal discussions within SPP concluded that SPP would not contest in Ang Mo Kio GRC and would consolidate resources with the Reform Party for contesting that ward. Tan's group consisted of Osman Sulaiman, Arthero Lim, Mansor Rahman, Lim Zi Rui, Vigneswari Ramachandran, and himself. To fund their entry, Tan raised $32,000 online. Tan and his group of candidates lost the elections, having garnered 49,851 (30.67%) votes.
