= New Naratif =

Independent media outlet

- Type: Online newspaper
- Founder(s): Thum Ping Tjin, Kirsten Han, Sonny Liew
- Founded: 2017
- Language: English; Bahasa Melayu; Bahasa Indonesia; Burmese; Chinese; Thai; Vietnamese
- Headquarters: Kuala Lumpur, Malaysia
- Website: https://newnaratif.com/

New Naratif (Malay for New Narrative) is a Malaysian–based online journalism platform and self-described independent media outlet that publishes content on Southeast Asian current affairs.

Founded in 2017, it is managed by Singaporean historian and former athlete Thum Ping Tjin and freelance journalist Kirsten Han. The outlet publishes investigative reporting, academic research, comics, explainers, videos and podcasts in English, Malay and other languages of Southeast Asia.

It describes itself as promoting "democracy, freedom of information and freedom of expression in Southeast Asia". It is funded by membership fees, philanthropic grants and undisclosed donations. The outlet is registered in Kuala Lumpur, Malaysia.

== Disputes with Singaporean authorities ==
The site has been involved in a number of disputes with Singaporean authorities, with the website often posting about Singaporean politics. Singaporean authorities have accused New Naratif of being a vessel of foreign interference – the website is based in Malaysia and relies heavily on undisclosed donations – an accusation that the outlet has denied.

During the 2020 Singaporean general election, New Naratif was investigated by Singaporean police for allegedly publishing paid advertisements on Facebook, which according to the Elections Department amounted to illegal conduct. Thum was subsequently questioned by police and his phone and laptop were seized. The post was taken down by Facebook after the Infocomm Media Development Authority issued a notice to the social media site for "unauthorised paid Internet election advertising" as the post was still available after 30 June (Nomination Day) and not sanctioned by any candidate or election agent.

New Naratif responded by asking authorities to stop their "long-standing campaign of harassment". A number of civil society groups led by South Africa's Civicus along with Article 19, Human Rights Watch and Amnesty International requested authorities to drop charges against the site.

== Reception ==
New York City–based Columbia Journalism Review highlighted New Naratif as an example of a number of emerging independent outlets from Asian countries, where freedom of the press is rare, as an "alternative" to the media dominated by primarily Western and Chinese outlets.
