= Breakfast Network =

Defunct Singaporean website

- Website type: Private
- Founded: 2013; Singapore
- Dissolved: December 2013
- Headquarters: Singapore
- Founder: Bertha Henson
- Industry: News Website
- Services: News
- Website: breakfastnetwork.sg
- Launched: October 2013
- Current status: Defunct

Breakfast Network was a Singapore-based community-led news service founded in early 2013 by former Straits Times journalist and Associate Editor Bertha Henson.

== Shut down ==
In December 2013, it shut down its website, after declining to comply with new regulations from the country's Media Development Authority requiring designated websites to register their key personnel and funding sources, among other private information, or be asked to cease all operations online, including social media platforms.
