= The Online Citizen =

Sociopolitical platform in Singapore

- Website type: Political commentary
- Available in: English
- Founded: December 2006; 19 years ago
- Headquarters: Singapore (2006-2021); Taiwan (2022-present)
- Country of origin: Singapore
- Founders: Andrew Loh; Remy Choo Zheng Xi
- Editor: Terry Xu

The Online Citizen (TOC) is a blogging platform based in Taiwan. Founded in December 2006 by Andrew Loh and Remy Choo Zheng Xi in Singapore, it is known for its political activism. It describes itself as a group of advocacy journalists who report on topics not generally covered by the mainstream media.

== History ==
In 2011, the Singapore Registry of Political Donations gazetted the platform as a political organization, noting that the editors of the website organized online and offline campaigns to change legislation and government policies. Under the Political Donations Act, political entities cannot receive funds from foreign contributors and anonymous contributions above SGD 5000. In 2014, the website registered for a class license, which was regulated under the Broadcast Act. It meant that it had to "undertake not to receive foreign funding for its provision, management and, or, operation as part of the registration".

=== 2018-2022: Defamation cases and closure ===
In February 2018, TOC was de-gazetted as a "political association", as it was run by only one person – editor Terry Xu, who has been responsible for the development of content since 2011, when its core team of editors left.

==== Criminal defamation over allegations against Singapore Cabinet ministers ====
On 4 September 2018, a letter written by Daniel De Costa Augustin alleging "corruption at the highest echelons" in the Singapore government was published on TOC. This led to computers belonging to Xu being seized by the police for investigation on 21 November 2018, forcing the site to go into a temporary hiatus. It was found that the De Costa had sent it to TOC through a friend's email account who did not intend for the account to be used in such a manner. On 21 November 2021, both Xu and De Costa was found guilty for defamation with the author being guilty for a charge under the Computer Misuse Act. On 21 April 2022, Xu was sentenced three weeks jail and De Costa three months and three weeks. Xu would be appealing against the sentence. In May 2023, his sentence was reduced to an S$8,000 fine on appeal. By then, Xu had finished serving his three-week sentence and gone to Taiwan.

==== 38 Oxley Road ====
On 1 September 2019, Hsien Loong sent a letter, via the Prime Minister Office, to The Online Citizen's (TOC) editor, Terry Xu over an article that was published on TOC, repeating the claims that he had tried to preserve the house against his father's wishes. In the same letter, he wrote that he would be taking legal actions, unless the article is taken down from TOC website and its Facebook page and Xu makes a full apology. However, Xu did not comply fully. On 5 September 2019, Hsien Loong sued Xu for repeating statements made by Lee's siblings, an action which critics questioned the use of Prime Minister Office resources for personal matters. Xu was found guilty in 2021. Hsien Loong was awarded S$210,000 in total damages, which he donated to charity.

==== 2021 suspension and closure ====
On 14 September 2021, the Infocomm Media Development Authority (IMDA) suspended TOC's broadcasting class license over a dispute over reports on funding sources and would cancel TOC's licence if the information request was not met by 28 September. TOC was also required not to publish any new articles beyond 16 September 2021, 3pm. Xu instead took the site offline on the morning of 16 September 2021. The license was cancelled on 15 October 2021. On 16 December 2021, TOC's judicial review application, challenging the orders by IMDA, was dismissed by the High Court.

=== 2022–present ===
On 16 September 2022, the website was relaunched, with Xu announcing that operations would be shifted to Taiwan under a new local company, Gutzy Asia. Xu also added that this relaunched website would provide daily news coverage in Asia and beyond Singapore. On 6 April 2023, Xu was fined S$18,000 for contempt of court by reproducing an open letter by an Australian citizen who questioned the equality of Singapore's justice system.

On 31 August 2024, Gutzy Asia shifted its operations back to The Online Citizen after it was designated a Declared Online Location for multiple POFMA directives.

In 2025, Xu was sued by Home Affairs Minister K Shanmugam and Manpower Minister Tan See Leng over allegations regarding transactions they made involving Good Class Bungalows (GCBs).In August 2025, he was found liable for defamation. In March 2026, Xu was ordered to pay them S$420,000. On 11 May 2026, Xu was ordered to pay them a further S$154,000 in costs and disbursements.

On 4 March 2026, the United Overseas Bank (UOB) was awarded S$125,000 in damages after suing Xu for defamation.

In March 2026, Xu and TOC were issued a POFMA correction directive after making false statements on the appointment of Lucien Wong as Attorney-General of Singapore in an article dated 9 March. Xu alleged that there was no information that Mr Wong had recused himself from acting on matters relating to the acquisition of 38 Oxley Road and that Workers' Party chair Sylvia Lim was not allowed to raise any follow-up questions on the attorney-general's re-appointment process. TOC was issued another POFMA order over false statements in an article about the Government’s response to two Singaporeans who allegedly served in the Israel Defense Forces (IDF) during the Gaza conflict.

On 30 June 2026, Singapore’s Ministry of Digital Development and Information designated two websites associated with ''The Online Citizen'', an alternate TOC website and Heidoh, as Declared Online Locations under the Protection from Online Falsehoods and Manipulation Act. The ministry said the declarations would take effect on 1 July 2026 and remain in force until 30 June 2028.

== Founders and editors ==
- Andrew Loh (Founder and former editor)
- Remy Choo Zheng Xi (Founder and former editor)
- Kumaran Pillai (former Chief Editor)
- Ravi Philemon (former Chief Editor)
- Terry Xu (Executive Editor)
