= Exclusion of judicial review in Singapore law =

Singapore's application of legal concept to protect the exercise of executive power

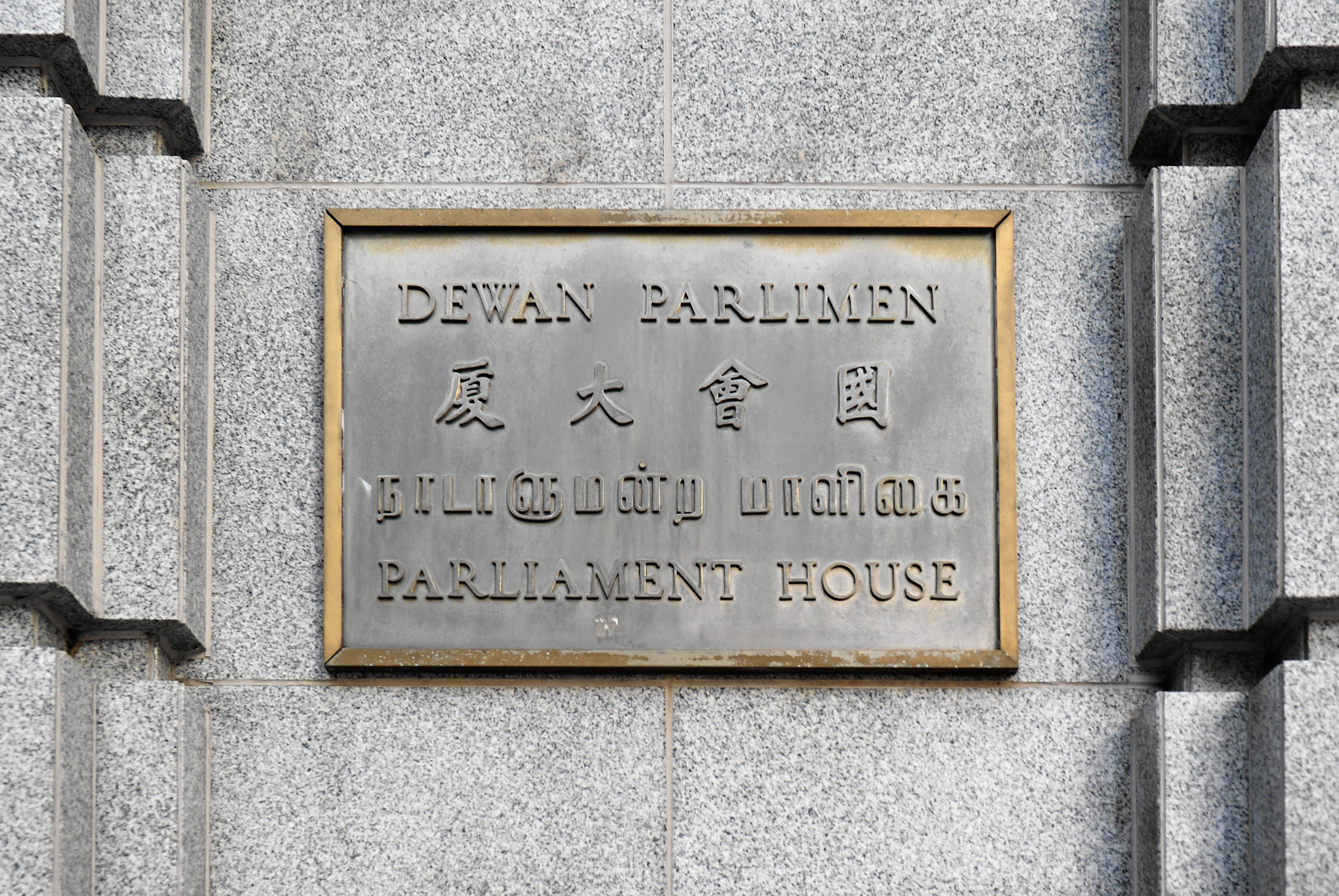
A sign at Parliament House in Singapore's four official languages. Parliament has attempted to prevent the courts from exercising judicial review over acts and decisions of certain public authorities through various means, including ouster clauses and subjectively worded powers in statutes.

Exclusion of judicial review has been attempted by the Parliament of Singapore to protect the exercise of executive power. Typically, this has been done though the insertion of finality or total ouster clauses into Acts of Parliament, or by wording powers conferred by Acts on decision-makers subjectively. Finality clauses are generally viewed restrictively by courts in the United Kingdom. The courts there have taken the view that such clauses are, subject to some exceptions, not effective in denying or restricting the extent to which the courts are able to exercise judicial review. In contrast, Singapore cases suggest that ouster clauses cannot prevent the High Court from exercising supervisory jurisdiction over the exercise of executive power where authorities have committed jurisdictional errors of law, but are effective against non-jurisdictional errors of law.

A partial ouster or time limit clause specifies a restricted period, after which no remedy will be available. Such clauses are generally effective, unless the public authority has acted in bad faith. Similarly, the existence of bad faith entitles applicants to challenge decisions of authorities despite the existence of statutory provisions declaring such decisions to be conclusive evidence of certain facts. In the absence of bad faith, the courts will enforce conclusive evidence clauses.

In general, subjectively worded powers are also viewed restrictively by the Singapore courts. In Chng Suan Tze v. Minister for Home Affairs (1988), the Court of Appeal took the view that an objective test applied to the exercise of discretion conferred by the Internal Security Act (Cap. 143, 1985 Rev. Ed.) ("ISA") on the President and the Minister for Home Affairs concerning the detention without trial of persons thought to be a risk to national security. Hence, the jurisdiction of the High Court was not completely ousted, and it could objectively examine whether the relevant decision-makers had exercised their powers properly. However, legislative amendments to the ISA in 1989 reversed the effect of Chng Suan Tze by mandating that the courts are to apply a subjective test to the exercise of the discretion, and by excluding judicial review except where there is doubt whether the procedures set out in the Act were adhered to. Nevertheless, the subjective test is only applicable in the context of the ISA, and the rule that an objective test applies to subjectively worded powers continues to apply where statutes other than the ISA are concerned.

== Total ouster or finality clauses ==
An example of a finality clause: Article 18(9) of the Constitution of Singapore

A decision of the Presidential Elections Committee as to whether a candidate for election to the office of President has fulfilled the requirement of paragraph (e) or (g)(iv) of Article 19(2) shall be final and shall not be subject to appeal or review in any court.

An ouster clause in a statute is an attempt by the legislature to prevent an act or decision by a public authority from being challenged before the courts. Such clauses thus serve as a signal to decision-makers that they may operate without fear of intervention by the courts at a later stage. One common kind of ouster clause is the total ouster or finality clause, which is inserted into a statute to indicate that the decision of a particular judge or tribunal is final and cannot be challenged by any court.

The main legal issue with ouster clauses is whether it is in fact possible to exclude the jurisdiction of the courts by the use of carefully drafted provisions. Thio Li-ann has noted that "courts generally loathe ouster clauses as these contradict the rule of law whereby judges finally declare the legal limits of power and also as the individual's ultimate recourse to the law is denied. Hence, courts try to construe these strictly to minimise their impact. In so doing, they may be going against the grain of parliamentary will."

Ouster clauses are related to another administrative law concept: jurisdictional and non-jurisdictional errors of law. Traditionally, at common law, an ouster clause precludes a court from interfering with a decision made by a public authority which was acting within its jurisdiction, but committed a non-jurisdictional error of law. However, the clause is not effective in preventing judicial review of errors of law that affect the jurisdiction of the authority to make the decision. For instance, in R. v. Medical Appeal Tribunal, ex parte Gilmore (1957), Lord Justice of Appeal Alfred Denning said that it was "well settled that the remedy by certiorari is never to be taken away by any statute except by the most clear and explicit words. The word 'final' is not enough." The effect of such a clause is to make "the decision final on the facts, but not final on the law. Notwithstanding that the decision is by a statute made 'final,' certiorari can still issue for excess of jurisdiction or for error of law on the face of the record." However, in the light of developments in the law, such a differentiation may no longer be applicable depending on the judicial school of thought employed.

=== UK position ===
==== General rule ====
The starting point for analysing ouster clauses and their effects is the landmark decision Anisminic Ltd. v. Foreign Compensation Commission (1968). In that case, the House of Lords is regarded as having abolished the distinction between jurisdictional and non-jurisdictional errors of law when it was considering the effect of an ouster clause. In Anisminic, their Lordships were faced with a provision which stated that "the determination by the Commission of any application made to them under this Act shall not be called in question in any court of law". In his judgment, Lord Reid differentiated between the arguments put forth by the parties. He held that while the respondents had argued that the provision clearly denied the court the ability to question the determination made by the Foreign Compensation Commission, the question at hand did not even involve the questioning of the purported determination and instead focused on whether there was in fact a valid determination. He pointed out that "if you seek to show that a determination is a nullity you are not questioning the purported determination – you are maintaining that it does not exist as a determination". He then held it was a well-established principle that a provision ousting the ordinary jurisdiction of the court must be construed strictly – if such a provision is reasonably capable of having two meanings, the meaning which preserves the ordinary jurisdiction of the court should be taken. If Parliament had intended to introduce a new kind of ouster clause that would protect such nullities from being questioned, better drafting of the provision would be required.

In his judgment, Lord Reid also took the opportunity to deal with the issue of jurisdictional and non-jurisdictional errors of law. While recognising the traditional understanding that jurisdictional errors of law are of no effect, his Lordship also stated that there are many cases where although the decision-maker has jurisdiction to decide, the determination is also a nullity. He then gave a non-exhaustive list of these cases:

- The decision-maker may have given its decision in bad faith.
- It may have made a decision which it had no power to make.
- It may have failed in the course of the inquiry to comply with the requirements of natural justice.
- It may, in perfect good faith, have misconstrued the provisions giving it power to act so that it failed to deal with the question remitted to it and decided some question which was not remitted to it.
- It may have refused to take into account something which it was required to take into account.
- It may have based its decision on some matter which, under the legal provisions establishing the decision-maker, it had no right to take into account.

However, what is of significance is that his Lordship did not expressly reject the effectiveness of such ouster clauses where the decision is valid. He recognised that "[u]ndoubtedly such a provision protects every determination which is not a nullity". Peter Cane has written that Lord Reid thus affirmed that "the ouster clause in question would be effective to prevent the award of a judicial review remedy only if the error of law was within jurisdiction". However, it appears that Anisminic had defined the concept of jurisdictional error of law so broadly that it had made redundant the old divide between jurisdictional and non-jurisdictional errors and had "led to the use of the word 'jurisdictional' in a wide sense to cover all errors of law which entailed illegality". The judgment thus had the effect of reducing the effect of statutory ouster clauses and expanding the limits of judicial review.

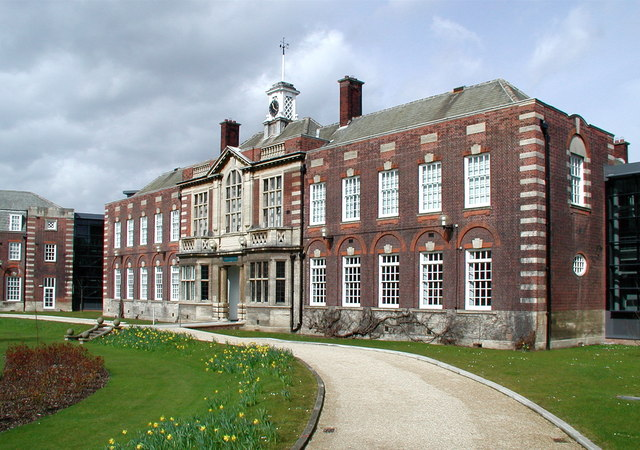
The Derwent Building of the University of Hull. In the 1992 case ex parte Page where the issue was whether the decision of a visitor (overseer) of the university was subject to judicial review, the House of Lords held that in general all errors of law, whether jurisdictional or non-jurisdictional, are reviewable.

Later cases have treated Anisminic as implying that any action committed in error by an administrative agency or body is deemed to affect the jurisdiction of the body to carry out the action, and hence is reviewable by a court of law despite the ouster clause. The blurred distinction between jurisdictional and non-jurisdictional errors of law was recognised and discussed in R. v. Lord President of the Privy Council, ex parte Page (1992). The House of Lords reviewed the development of general principles of judicial review since Anisminic and concluded that the courts will intervene to ensure that the powers of public decision-making bodies are exercised lawfully. In his judgment, Lord Browne-Wilkinson referred to O'Reilly v. Mackman (1983) and opined that "the decision in [Anisminic] rendered obsolete the distinction between errors of law on the face of the record and other errors of law by extending the doctrine of ultra vires." Thus, an ouster clause is ineffective when the decision-maker has acted unlawfully, whether the unlawfulness is jurisdictional or non-jurisdictional in nature. This is because "Parliament had only conferred the decision-making power on the basis that it was to be exercised on the correct legal basis: a misdirection in law in making the decision therefore rendered the decision ultra vires".

The issue was revisited in the subsequent case of R. (on the application of Cart) v. Upper Tribunal (2011). The Supreme Court of the United Kingdom disapproved of certain pronouncements by the lower courts which appeared to signal a return to the pre-Anisminic position. According to Lord Dyson, this was not justified as "the importance of Anisminic is that it showed that a material error of law renders a decision a 'nullity' so that the decision is in principle judicially reviewable". He went on to state that "as a matter of principle, there is no justification for drawing the line at jurisdictional error". In his opinion, any restrictions on judicial review require justification and, prima facie, such review should be available to challenge the legality of decisions of public bodies.

==== Exceptions ====
===== Decisions under domestic laws; court decisions =====
Despite the extensiveness of the ruling in Anisminic, it appears that there may be instances where the courts will still be bound by the jurisdictional and non-jurisdictional error of law divide. Cane has noted that there are three views. The first is that the distinction between jurisdictional and non-jurisdictional errors of law is still relevant, while the second is that all errors of law go to jurisdiction. The third view takes a middle ground that allows for certain exceptions to the approach in the second view.

This middle ground approach was discussed in ex parte Page when their Lordships dealt with whether the court can intervene and review a decision made by a visitor (overseer) of a university. Lord Browne-Wilkinson found that there were two reasons why the general rule that all errors of law are reviewable does not apply to visitors. First, the reason why courts can intervene in a normal case where the decision is considered ultra vires is because the law applicable to a decision made by such a body is the general law of the land. The visitor in ex parte Page did not apply the general law of the land but, rather, a "domestic law" (the university's charter and statutes) of which he was the sole arbiter and over which the courts had no cognizance. Therefore, the visitor "cannot err in law in reaching [his] decision since the general law is not the applicable law".

Secondly, there is a difference between the kinds of tribunals the decisions of which are being considered for judicial review. The source of this reasoning is the dissenting judgment of Lord Justice Geoffrey Lane in Pearlman v. Keepers and Governors of Harrow School (1978). Lord Browne-Wilkinson noted that this dissenting judgment was approved by the Judicial Committee of the Privy Council in South East Asia Fire Bricks Sdn. Bhd. v. Non-Metallic Mineral Products Manufacturing Employees Union (1980), and also by a majority in Re Racal Communications Ltd. (1980). In the latter case, Lord Diplock highlighted that the decision in Anisminic only applies to administrative bodies or tribunals as there is a presumption that Parliament does not intend such bodies to be the final arbiters of questions of law. This can be contrasted with courts of law in respect of which such a presumption is not present. Instead, the presumption is that "where Parliament had provided that the decision of an inferior court was final and conclusive the High Court should not be astute to find that the inferior court's decision on a question of law had not been made final and conclusive, thereby excluding the jurisdiction to review it."

The views expressed by Lord Browne-Wilkinson have been questioned by Cane. As regards the first reason, he has argued that the distinction between domestic law and general law is problematic. Such institutions may actually operate under a statutory framework which can result in a mixed issue of both general and domestic law arising. As such, the view taken by Lord Browne-Wilkinson cannot be as cleanly applied as he had described it to be. Moreover, the actual scope of ex parte Page has yet to be resolved. There is some uncertainty as to the extent the exception applies to decision-makers other than visitors. Where the second reason is concerned, Cane has noted that the correctness of the distinction between administrative tribunals and courts may be questionable as such an approach was "rejected by a Divisional Court and, apparently, by Lord Diplock himself."

===== Comprehensive tribunal system to correct errors of law =====
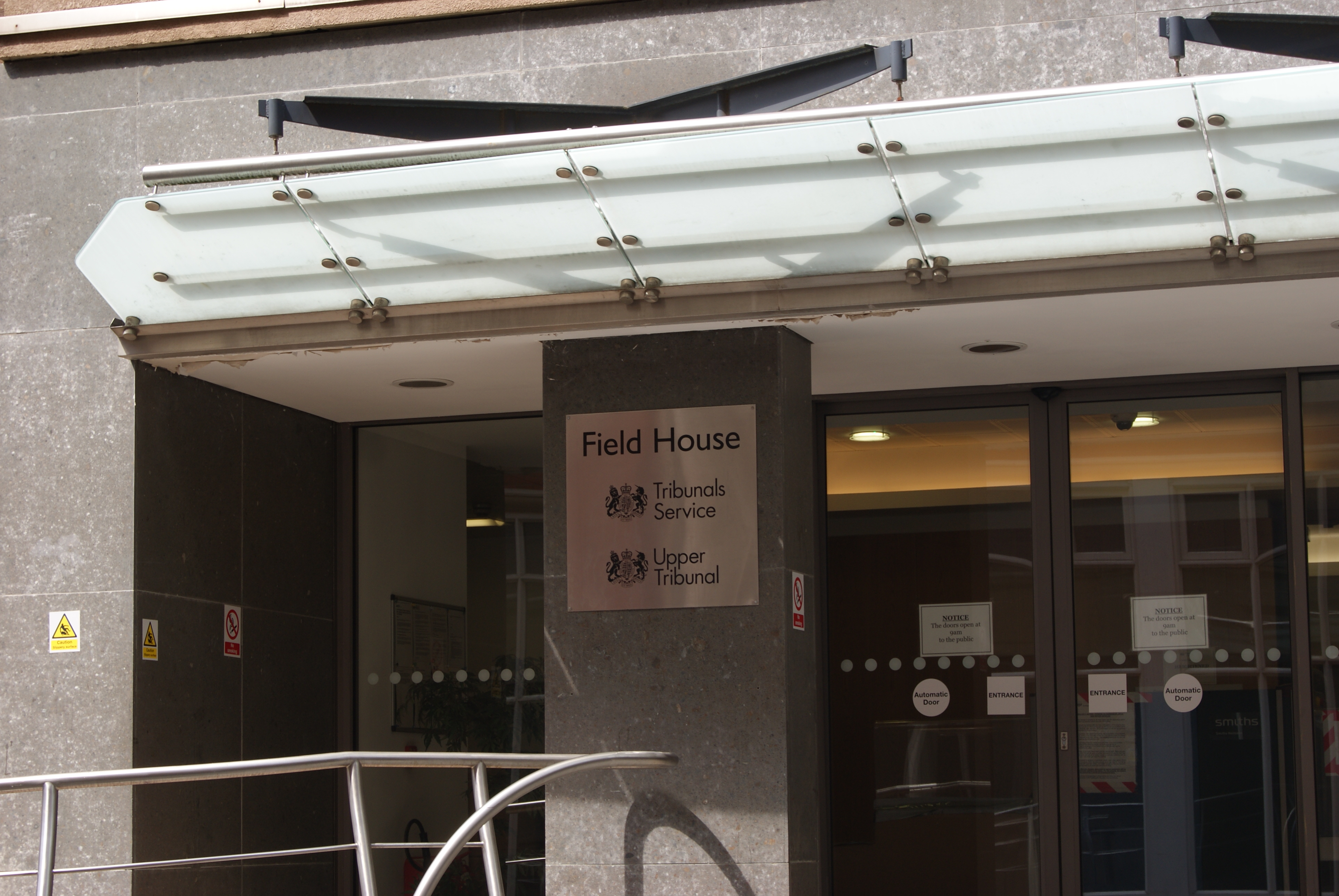
Field House at 15 Bream's Buildings, London, where the Upper Tribunal is based. In a 2011 judgment, the UK Supreme Court held that not all decisions of the Upper Tribunal are subject to judicial review.

Another exception can be found in the Cart judgment. Having affirmed the position taken in Anisminic, Lord Dyson then qualified his statement by emphasising that "the scope of judicial review should be no more (as well as no less) than is proportionate and necessary for the maintaining of the rule of law". On the facts of the case, he found it was neither proportionate nor necessary for the maintenance of the rule of law to require unrestricted judicial review. By enacting the Tribunals, Courts and Enforcement Act 2007, Parliament had rationalised the system of administrative tribunals and had created the Upper Tribunal to hear appeals from lower tribunals, thus avoiding the ordinary courts from being overwhelmed by judicial review applications. As the system of tribunals provided ample opportunity for the correction of errors of law, this substantive policy reason precluded the need for all decisions of the Upper Tribunal to be subject to judicial review. Thus, judicial review would only be permitted from an Upper Tribunal decision if it would "raise some important point of principle or practice" or there was "some other compelling reason".

=== Singapore position ===
The High Court case of Re Application by Yee Yut Ee (1978) suggests that the pre-Anisminic position on ouster clauses applies in Singapore; that is, the distinction between jurisdictional and non-jurisdictional errors of law persists, and an ouster clause is only ineffective where a jurisdictional error of law has been committed. The ouster clause in question was section 46 of the Industrial Relations Act which states:

Subject to the provisions of this Act an award shall be final and conclusive, and no award or decision or order of a Court or the President or a referee shall be challenged, appealed against, reviewed, quashed, or called in question in any court and shall not be subject to certiorari, prohibition, mandamus or injunction in any court on any account.

The Court neither expressly rejected nor affirmed the abolition of the distinction in Anisminic and its effect on the effectiveness of ouster clauses. Instead, the Court cited UK authorities holding that ouster clauses are ineffective when there has been an absence of jurisdiction or an excess of jurisdiction on the part of the decision-maker, a position which characterised the law prior to Anisminic. The Court did refer to Anisminic but only to observe that the House of Lords had held the ouster clause involved in that case to be irrelevant because a purported determination by the Foreign Compensation Commission which was legally incorrect could not be considered a real determination and had no effect at all. Ultimately, the Court quashed the order made by the Industrial Arbitration Court because it contained an error of law which had caused that court to exceed its jurisdiction.

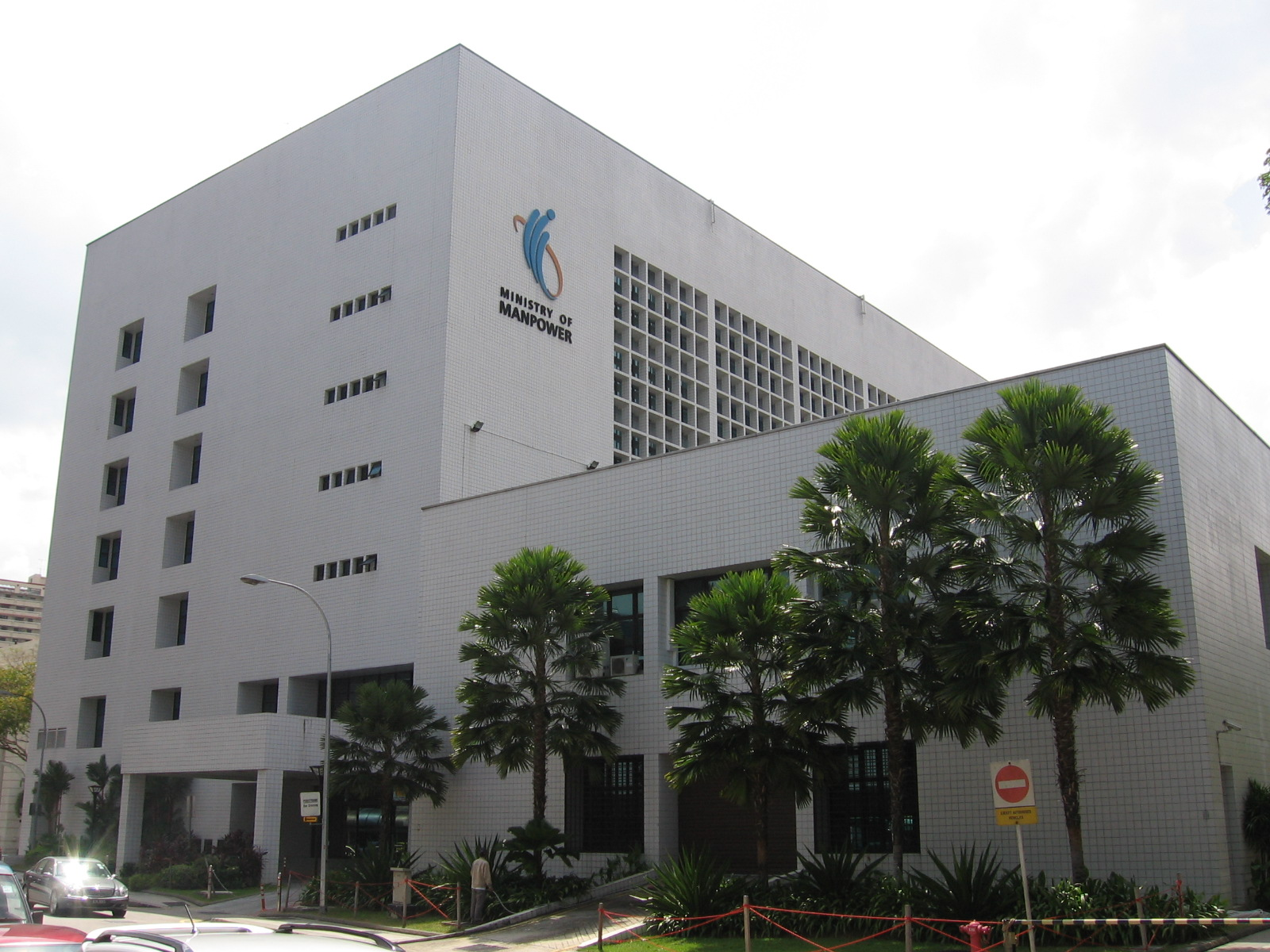
The Ministry of Manpower Building. A 1999 High Court case involving the Minister suggests that in Singapore ouster clauses remain effective to prevent non-jurisdictional errors of law committed by public authorities from being challenged in court, unlike the UK position.

In Stansfield Business International Pte. Ltd. v. Minister for Manpower (1999), an employee fired for incompetence accused the plaintiff company of unfair dismissal and made representations to the Minister for Manpower under section 14 of the Employment Act to be reinstated. After investigating this claim, the Ministry came to the conclusion that the dismissal was made without just cause and recommended payment to the employee. Although section 14(5) of the Employment Act provides that "the decision of the Minister on any representation made under this section shall be final and conclusive and shall not be challenged in any court", the company applied for judicial review against the Minister's decision.

The High Court held that the ouster clause in section 14(5) of the Employment Act was ineffective as there had been a breach of the rules of natural justice in the process by which the Minister's decision was reached. In his judgment, Justice Warren L. H. Khoo stated that the "broad principle" in Anisminic governing the matter had been restated in the case of South East Asia Fire Bricks as follows:

[W]hen words in a statute oust the power of the High Court to review decisions of an inferior tribunal by certiorari, they must be construed strictly... they will not have the effect of ousting that power if the inferior tribunal has acted without jurisdiction or "if it has done or failed to do something in the course of the inquiry which is of such a nature that its decision is a nullity": per Lord Reid at p. 171 [of Anisminic]. But if the inferior tribunal has merely made an error of law which does not affect its jurisdiction, and if its decision is not a nullity for some reason such as breach of the rules of natural justice, then the ouster will be effective.

In a 2010 lecture to students of the Singapore Management University School of Law, Chief Justice Chan Sek Keong briefly discussed the decision in Stansfield. He pointed out that Justice Khoo's statements on Anisminic were obiter dicta because the decision had been "based on a breach of natural justice and not the doctrine of error of law". He also considered an academic argument that an ouster clause may be inconsistent with Article 93 of the Singapore Constitution which vests the judicial power of Singapore in the courts. Chief Justice Chan stated that if this proposition was answered in the affirmative, it would follow that the supervisory jurisdiction of the courts cannot be ousted, and there would thus be no need for Singapore courts to draw the distinction between jurisdictional and non-jurisdictional errors of law. Nevertheless, he highlighted the fact that he was not expressing an opinion on the issue.

== Partial ouster or time limit clauses ==
Unlike a total ouster or finality clause which seeks to preclude judicial review entirely, a partial ouster or time limit clause specifies a restricted period of time after which no remedy will be available. Such clauses are generally effective, unless the public authority has acted in bad faith, in which case the decision impugned may be subject to judicial review even though the time permitted for challenging it has lapsed.

In Smith v. East Elloe Rural District Council (1956), the House of Lords concluded by a majority that they could not impugn a partial ouster clause because, according to Viscount Simonds, "plain words must be given their plain meaning", even though fraud on the part of the public authority had been alleged. In contrast, Lord Reid gave a dissenting opinion in which he doubted whether an order that had been obtained by corrupt or fraudulent means could be protected from being questioned in court. Despite the subsequent ruling in Anisminic, in R. v. Secretary of State for the Environment, ex parte Ostler (1976) the Court of Appeal of England and Wales applied Smith and upheld the validity of a partial ouster clause that gave the applicants six weeks to challenge a decision. Lord Denning, the Master of the Rolls, explained that upholding partial ouster clauses promoted the certainty of the executive's actions. It would not be in the public interest if applicants could challenge decisions after the time limit for doing so had expired, as this would delay actions taken by the executive. As Lord Justice of Appeal Michael Mann put it in R. v. Cornwall County Council, ex parte Huntington (1992):

The intention of Parliament when it uses an Anisminic clause is that questions as to validity are not excluded. When paragraphs such as those considered in ex p. Ostler are used, then the legislative intention is that questions as to invalidity may be raised on the specified grounds in the prescribed time and in the prescribed manner, but that otherwise the jurisdiction of the court is excluded in the interest of certainty.

== Conclusive evidence clauses ==
Provisions in statutes declaring that certain decisions by public authorities shall be conclusive evidence of some facts have been found by the Singapore courts to be valid, and therefore have the effect of preventing applicants from challenging most – but not all – of such decisions by way of judicial review. In Galstaun v. Attorney-General (1980), the applicant alleged that the Collector of Land Revenue had compulsorily acquired more of his land that was required for public purposes pursuant to the Land Acquisition Act. The High Court held that the argument had to be rejected in the light of section 5(3) of the Act, which provided that the President's declaration that land was needed for a public purpose "shall be conclusive evidence that the land is needed for the purpose specified therein". The Court said: "When the Government declares that a certain purpose is a public purpose it must be presumed that the Government is in possession of facts which induce the Government to declare that the purpose is a public purpose". However, in Teng Fuh Holdings Pte. Ltd. v. Collector of Land Revenue (2006), the Court clarified that section 5(3) cannot prevent judicial intervention if there is evidence that the Government exercised its power of compulsory acquisition in bad faith.

== Subjectively worded powers ==
An example of a subjectively worded power: Section 8(1) of the Internal Security Act

If the President is satisfied with respect to any person that, with a view to preventing that person from acting in any manner prejudicial to the security of Singapore or any part thereof or to the maintenance of public order or essential services therein, it is necessary to do so, the Minister shall make an order —

(a) directing that such person be detained for any period not exceeding two years ...

Another method employed by the legislature to restrict judicial review by the courts is to cast statutory language in a subjective form. A subjectively worded power suggests that the discretion to exercise this power rests entirely with the minister, statutory body or agency referred to, in which case the view might be taken that a court should not query how the power has been exercised. Examples of subjectively worded powers include powers that are stated to be exercisable "if the Minister so directs" or "as the Minister thinks fit". However, as with ouster clauses, courts have traditionally displayed resistance to such provisions. In practice, they are subject to the normal grounds of judicial review set forth in the UK case Council of Civil Service Unions v. Minister for the Civil Service ("the GCHQ case", 1983); in other words, the exercise of power may be invalidated if determined to be illegal, irrational or procedurally improper.

=== In the Internal Security Act ===
==== Subjective or objective test? ====
Section 8(1) of the Internal Security Act ("ISA") empowers the Minister for Home Affairs to detain a person without trial if the President "is satisfied" that this step is necessary because the person is, among other things, a threat to national security. Section 10 of the Act states that the Minister can direct that a detention order be suspended subject to conditions "as the Minister sees fit", and can also revoke such a direction "if he is satisfied" that the detainee failed to observe any condition or if it is necessary in the public interest to do so.

In the seminal Court of Appeal decision Chng Suan Tze v. Minister for Home Affairs (1988), the respondents submitted that the President's discretion under section 8(1) was subjective, and so was not open to review by the courts. The appellants argued that the discretion was objective, and thus a court of law could review the grounds on which the discretion had been exercised. The Court held that an objective test applied to the subjectively worded powers in sections 8 and 10, and hence the exercise of these powers was normally challengeable on the GCHQ grounds of judicial review. In coming to this decision, it disapproved of a 1971 High Court decision, Lee Mau Seng v. Minister for Home Affairs, which had held to the contrary. While the Court's views regarding the applicability of an objective test were obiter, later Singapore decisions have confirmed this as the correct approach. It gave several reasons for its decision. First, the reasoning in cases supporting a subjective test was found to be questionable, and, secondly, such a test was inconsistent with Article 12(1) of the Constitution. Finally, the notion of a subjective or unfettered discretion was contrary to the rule of law and all powers had legal limits.

==== 1989 legislative intervention ====
On 25 January 1989, the Constitution of the Republic of Singapore (Amendment) Act 1989 and the Internal Security (Amendment) Act 1989 were passed by Parliament to confirm the applicability of the subjective test laid down in Lee Mau Seng as the law governing judicial review of the executive's discretionary powers under the ISA. These Acts came into force on 27 and 30 January 1989 respectively. Speaking during the Second Reading of the constitutional amendment bill, Minister for Law S. Jayakumar said the Government was taking this step because it was of the view that the courts' application of an objective test would amount to judicial usurpation of the executive's functions in matters pertaining to national security, which the judiciary is ill-equipped to deal with. Its stance was that the objective test would empower the courts to substitute their views on the proper exercise of discretionary power conferred under the ISA for that of the executive in contravention of the separation of powers doctrine. Moreover, the judicial process, unlike executive decision-making, was not conducive to a swift response to national security threats. The courts, unlike the executive, lacked access to inadmissible evidence relevant to security matters, and judges did not possess the skill and knowledge of the security experts employed by the executive. Furthermore, the objective test did not find favour with the Government because it had been imported from the United Kingdom and other Commonwealth jurisdictions. Since the objective test had been formulated by foreign judges without consideration of Singapore's local conditions, the Government was averse to the idea of allowing the objective test to shape the development of Singapore law on matters of national security under the ISA.

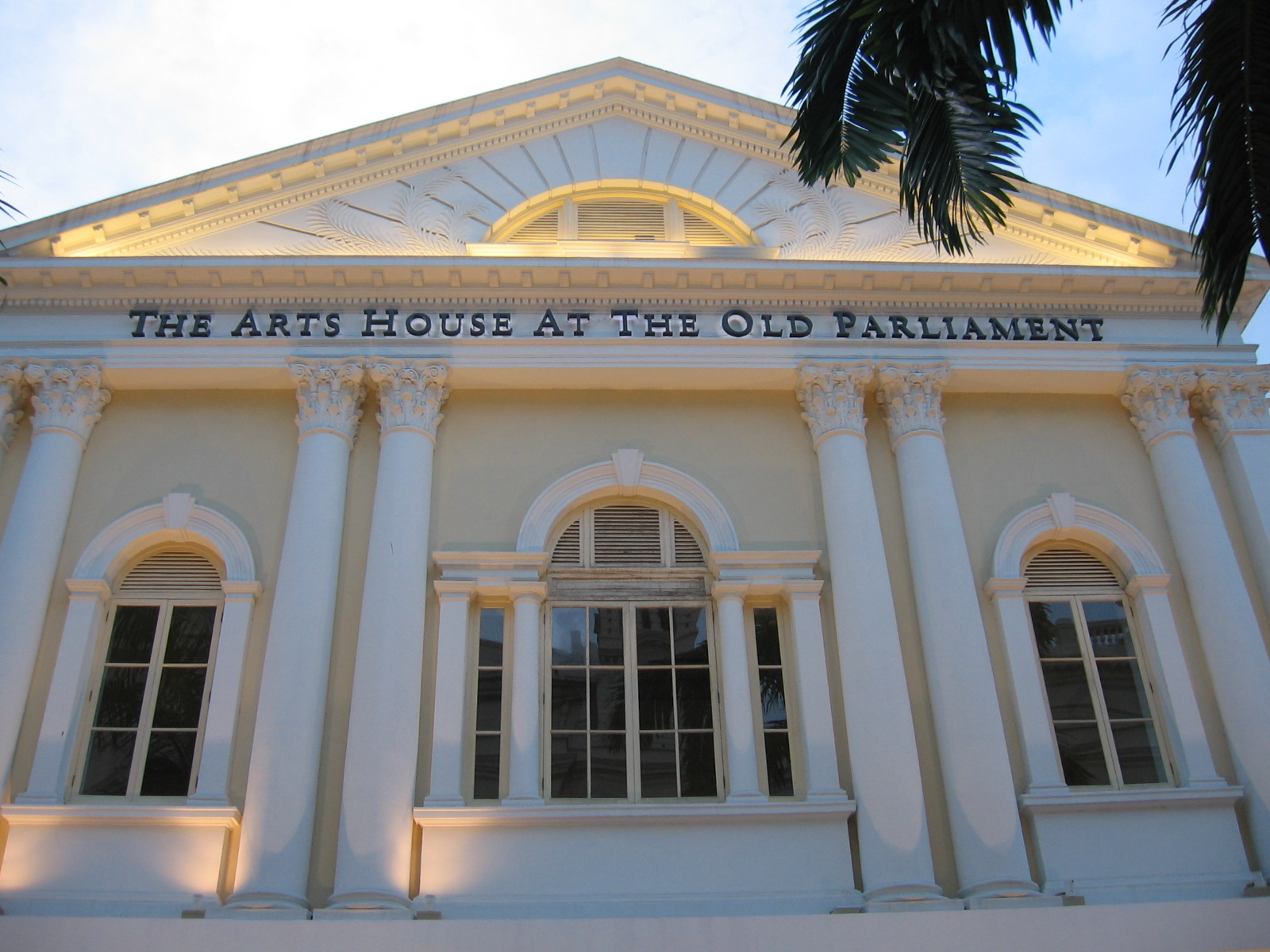
Old Parliament House, which was the seat of Parliament until 1999. In 1989, Parliament amended the Constitution and the Internal Security Act to confirm that exercise of discretion under the latter Act was subjective, rather than objective as held by the Court of Appeal in a 1988 case.

Jayakumar said that while the Government recognised that the subjective test enhanced the potential for abuse of executive discretion under the ISA, the best safeguard against such abuse of power was not to give the courts powers of judicial review because an unscrupulous government could still tamper with the composition of the courts to impair this judicial check. Instead, the crucial safeguard was for the electorate to make wise voting choices to put an honest and incorruptible government into power.

The amendments to the Constitution paved the way for intended amendments to the ISA. The new Article 149(3) stated that if the issue of the validity of any act done or decision made by the President or the Minister for Home Affairs arose in any court proceedings commenced before or after 27 January 1989, it was to be determined in accordance with any law enacted by Parliament for this purpose, and Article 93 of the Constitution could not be relied upon to invalidate such a law. Pursuant to Article 149(3), Parliament then inserted new sections into the ISA. In particular, section 8B(1) confirmed the judgment in Lee Mau Seng by declaring that "the law governing the judicial review of any decision made or act done in pursuance of any power conferred upon the President or the Minister by the provisions of this Act shall be the same as was applicable and declared in Singapore on the 13th day of July 1971; and no part of the law before, on or after that date of any other country in the Commonwealth relating to judicial review shall apply". In addition, section 8B(1) was made subject to section 8B(2), which seeks to oust judicial review in any court of any act done or decision made by the President or the Minister under the ISA, save where there is any question which relates to compliance with any procedural requirement of the ISA governing such acts or decisions. Jayakumar said in Parliament that section 8B(2) sought not only to prevent the courts from questioning the soundness of the subjective test, but also to anticipate any legal challenges on the basis that the subjective test laid down in Lee Mau Seng only applies to the judicial review of detention orders and not to other acts or decisions under the ISA by the President or Minister, such as suspension directions and revocations of such directions.

==== Operation of subjectively worded powers in the ISA after the 1989 amendments ====
The 1989 amendments to the ISA were challenged before the High Court in Teo Soh Lung v. Minister for Home Affairs (1989). Justice Frederick Arthur Chua held that sections 8B(1) and 8B(2) of the ISA govern judicial review in the context of that Act, and thus preclude any consideration of the legal position laid down in the obiter remarks of the Court of Appeal in Chng Suan Tze. Therefore, applying the subjective test, the respondents' burden of justifying the legality of the applicant's detention was discharged as the respondents had produced a valid detention order and evidence of the subjective satisfaction of the President, acting on the advice of the Cabinet, that the applicant was a risk to national security.

The applicant then appealed to the Court of Appeal. The Court of Appeal construed section 8B(1) in accordance with the clear legislative intention expressed through the plain wording of the provision. It held that the provision reinstates the legal position laid down in Lee Mau Seng as the law governing judicial review of decisions made or acts done pursuant to the executive's powers under the ISA. In order to determine the law on judicial review of the exercise of executive discretion under the ISA, it is necessary to ascertain the exact decision laid down in Lee Mau Seng. However, the Court declined to opine whether the Lee Mau Seng decision meant that a detention order cannot be challenged on the basis that it was made for reasons completely outside the scope of the ISA. This was because on the facts of the case it had not been established that the applicant was re-detained for reasons not contemplated by section 8(1) of the ISA and completely unrelated to national security. Notably, the Court did not decide whether section 8B(2) of the ISA precludes it from reviewing a detention order shown to have been made for purposes other than national security, or whether the 1989 amendments to the ISA are outside the scope of the legislative power conferred on Parliament by the amended Article 149 of the Constitution.

=== In other statutes ===
Due to the 1989 amendments to the Constitution and the ISA, the exercise of the subjectively worded powers in the ISA is not judicially reviewable by the courts, except when there has been some non-compliance with the procedures set out in the Act. On the other hand, the objective test laid down in Chng Suan Tze continues to be the law governing judicial review of the exercise of executive discretion under subjectively worded provisions in statutes other than the ISA. In Yong Vui Kong v. Attorney-General (2011), the Court of Appeal opined that the 1989 legislative amendments did not completely reverse Chng Suan Tze. Apart from restricting the courts' supervisory jurisdiction to reviewing decisions made under the ISA for procedural impropriety, Parliament did not disturb the principle laid down in Chng Suan Tze that the notion of a subjective or unfettered discretion – that is, power without legal limits – is contrary to the rule of law, which demands that courts should be able to examine the exercise of discretionary power. Since Parliament did not undermine this principle when it legislatively reversed Chng Suan Tze, it should be taken to have implicitly endorsed the principle.

In Kamal Jit Singh v. Minister for Home Affairs (1992), the statutory provision in question was section 30 of the Criminal Law (Temporary Provisions) Act ("CLTPA"), which states as follows:

Whenever the Minister [of Home Affairs] is satisfied with respect to any person, whether the person is at large or in custody, that the person has been associated with activities of a criminal nature, the Minister may, with the consent of the Public Prosecutor —

(a) if he is satisfied that it is necessary that the person be detained in the interests of public safety, peace and good order, by order under his hand direct that the person be detained for any period not exceeding 12 months from the date of the order; or
(b) if he is satisfied that it is necessary that the person be subject to the supervision of the police, by order direct that the person be subject to the supervision of the police for any period not exceeding 3 years from the date of the order. [Emphasis added.]

The Court of Appeal suggested that, in the light of Chng Suan Tze, the validity of an order for preventive detention made by the Minister under section 30 of the CLTPA is dependent on the objective satisfaction of the Minister. Moreover, in Re Wong Sin Yee (2007), which also involved judicial review of an applicant's detention under section 30 of the CLTPA, the High Court, following the decision in Chng Suan Tze, held that the absence of the need to establish a jurisdictional or precedent fact meant that the scope of judicial review as regards the exercise of the Minister's discretion under section 30 was limited to the GCHQ grounds of judicial review. The Court thus applied an objective test to the subjectively worded powers in section 30; if it Court had applied a subjective test, it would have deferred to the subjective satisfaction of the Minister that the detention was in the interests of public safety, peace and good order.
