= Fettering of discretion in Singapore administrative law =

Singaporean legal doctrine

Fettering of discretion by a public authority is one of the grounds of judicial review in Singapore administrative law. It is regarded as a form of illegality. An applicant may challenge a decision by an authority on the basis that it has either rigidly adhered to a policy it has formulated, or has wrongfully delegated the exercise of its statutory powers to another body. If the High Court finds that a decision-maker has fettered its discretion, it may hold the decision to be ultra vires – beyond the decision-maker's powers – and grant the applicant a suitable remedy such as a quashing order to invalidate the decision.

It is not wrong for a public authority to develop policies to guide its decision-making. Neither will it necessarily be considered to have fettered its discretion by adhering to such policies, as long as it approaches decisions with an open mind and is willing to give genuine consideration to each case at hand. It has been noted that by endorsing its application in this manner, the High Court has given legal effect to informal rules or policies, which therefore amount to "soft law".

Where a statute gives a decision-maker a discretionary power, it is generally unlawful for the decision-maker to delegate that power to another person or body unless the statute itself expressly provides that this may be done. Thus, it is illegal for a decision-maker to abdicate its responsibility of exercising power by taking orders from other bodies. The Carltona doctrine of English administrative law (which Singapore inherited at independence) allows a civil servant to take a decision on behalf of a minister, even where the statute confers discretion on the minister. The Interpretation Act of Singapore provides that the exercise of a minister's power may be done under the signature of the permanent secretary to the ministry which the minister is responsible for, or by any public officer authorized in writing by the minister. In addition, ministers are permitted to depute other persons to exercise certain powers or perform certain duties on their behalf.

== Introduction ==
In the context of Westminster systems of government, all legal power conferred on the executive by legislation is "inevitably discretionary to a greater or lesser extent". When exercising judicial review of such discretionary powers, the courts are concerned with whether they have been exercised in a lawful manner in accordance with Parliament's presumed intentions in conferring such powers.

Over time, the courts have developed various grounds upon which discretionary powers may be reviewed, holding that Parliament must be assumed not to have intended for decision-makers to exercise powers in such improper ways. The wrongful exercise of discretion may refer to "not exercising it at all or being subject to external influences in its exercise, as well as abusing conferred discretion".

When a public authority fetters its discretion, it can either be said to have failed to exercise its discretionary power or to have been subject to external influences. In the Singapore High Court decision Lines International Holding (S) Pte. Ltd. v. Singapore Tourist Promotion Board (1997), two distinct forms of fettering of discretion were recognized: fettering of discretion through rigid adherence to a policy, and fettering of discretion by an unlawful delegation of authority. These two forms of fettering of discretion have been said to represent two elements defining the concept of discretion in administrative law – the first form relates to freedom of choice, and second form the notion of one's personal discretion.

It has been observed that in Singapore administrative law, "extensive reference is made to the landmark English cases", and in particular English administrative law has largely influenced the adoption of the doctrine of fettering of discretion in Singapore. One exception is that although a contractual fetter on discretion has been established in English law to be a separate ground of review, this has yet to be recognized by the Singapore courts. In Birkdale District Electricity Supply Co. v. Southport Corporation (1926), the House of Lords held that if legislation entrusts a public authority with certain powers and duties to be exercised for public purposes, it is illegal for the authority to enter into a contract that prevents itself from exercising its powers.

== Fettering discretion by rigid adherence to a policy ==
Public authorities given discretion under statute to make certain decisions often adopt non-statutory policies to guide them in their exercise of such discretionary powers. In Lines International, Justice Judith Prakash noted that were it the case that statutory bodies could not formulate policies or guidelines except through duly promulgated regulations, "then everything would come to a grinding halt while policy decisions had to be communicated to the Attorney-General's Chambers, then drafted into regulations and then the drafts approved by the organisation concerned before being sent on to Parliament and effected by gazette notification. That is not the way the executive arm of any common law country functions."

The principle of not fettering one's discretion "directs attention to the attitude of the decision-maker, preventing him from rigidly excluding the possibility of any exception to that rule or policy in a deserving case". A decision-maker must not "shut his ears" to exceptional cases because of such a policy.

The ground of fettering discretion on this basis is distinct from the right to a fair hearing. The latter relates to a separate ground of judicial review, namely, procedural impropriety, and particularly the audi alteram partem ("hear the other side") principle.

=== English position ===
The English courts have held that there is nothing wrong with a public authority adopting a policy to base its decisions on as long as the authority does not refuse to listen at all to anyone who has something new to say. Both the English and Singapore positions are similar in that they both regard consideration of exceptional cases as the benchmark for whether discretion has been fettered. In R. v. Port of London Authority, ex parte Kynoch, Ltd. (1918), the Court of Appeal of England and Wales held that:

Where a tribunal in the honest exercise of its discretion has adopted a policy, and, without refusing to hear an applicant, intimates to him what its policy is, and that after hearing him it will in accordance with its policy decide against him, unless there is something exceptional in his case ... if the policy has been adopted for reasons which the tribunal may legitimately entertain, no objection could be taken to such a course.

The House of Lords agreed with ex parte Kynoch in British Oxygen Co. Ltd. v Minister of Technology (1970). The court held that there was nothing to stop the Minister from requiring the operation of some limiting rule if that is what policy or good administration requires. It also reiterated that for discretion to be unfettered, consideration must be given to exceptional cases. "What the authority must not do is to refuse to listen at all. There can be no objection to [the formulation of the rule], provided the authority is always willing to listen to anyone with something new to say."

This position was further buttressed in Re Findlay (1984), where four prisoners contended that the Home Secretary's new policy of refusing parole in all but exceptional cases was a fetter upon his discretion. The House of Lords rejected the argument that the relevant statutory provisions required "individual consideration of individual cases in every instance, free of presumptions or policies", and held that it would be difficult to understand how a Secretary of State could properly manage the complexities of his statutory duty without a policy.

=== Singapore position ===
==== Lines International conditions ====
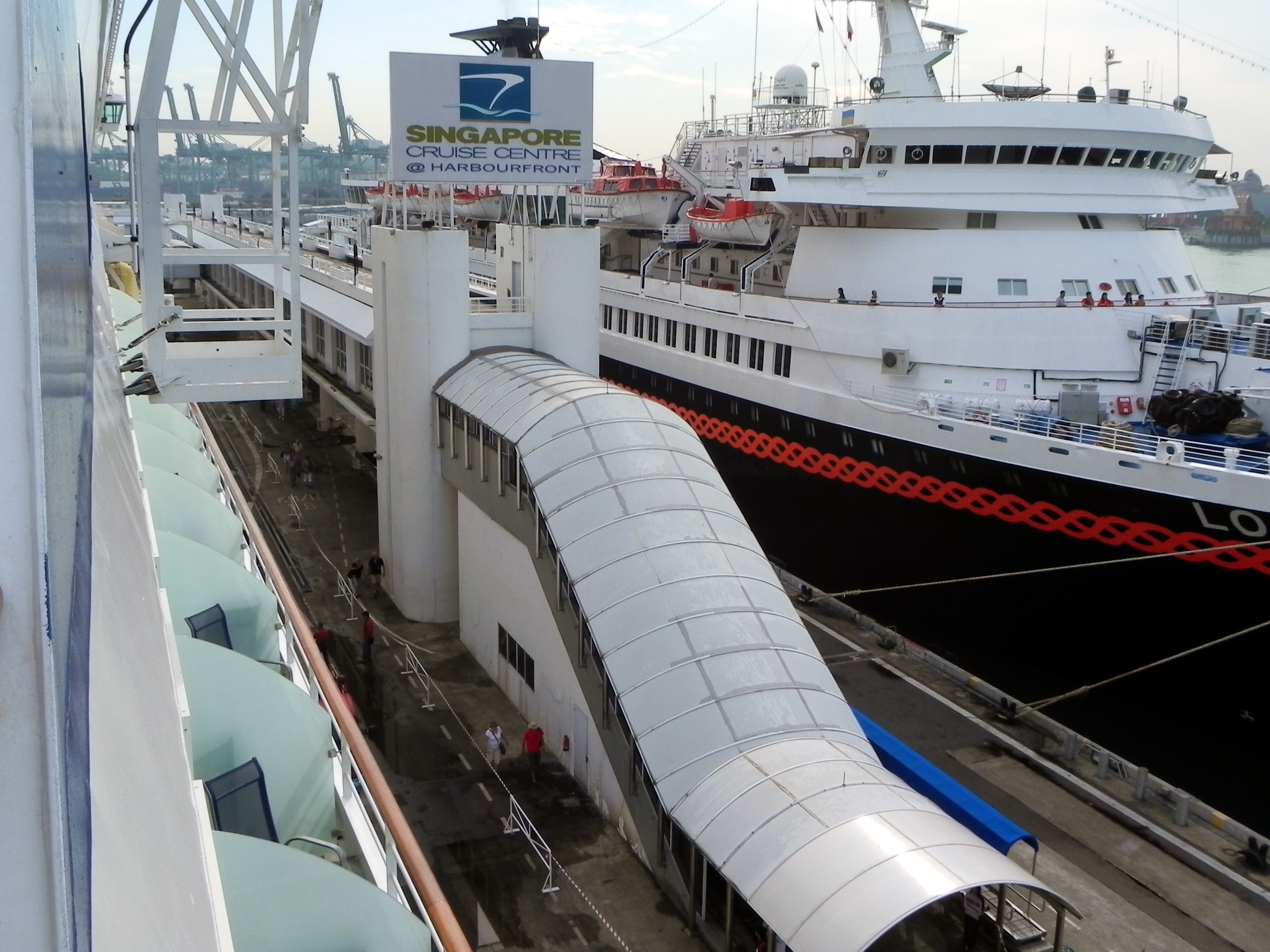
A ship berthed at the Singapore Cruise Centre in December 2010. In a 1997 case, the High Court held, among other things, that the Port of Singapore Authority had not fettered its discretion by rigidly applying a policy to restrict the number of "cruises-to-nowhere", which were mainly for gambling purposes.

In Lines International, the plaintiff, a cruise operator, challenged the adoption by the Singapore Tourist Promotion Board ("STPB") and the Port of Singapore Authority ("PSA") of a general policy in the form of non-statutory guidelines regulating cruises-to-nowhere ("CNWs"), which were mainly operated for gambling purposes. The guidelines had been read out to cruise operators at a meeting. One condition was that berths might not be allocated for CNWs if operators scheduled more than 30% of their cruises as CNWs over a three-month period. The plaintiff argued that the PSA's power to control the use of its berths had to be exercised through subsidiary legislation. The High Court held that the PSA had discretion in deciding which vessels could use which berths, and went on to consider whether the PSA had fettered its discretion in enforcing the guidelines. Justice Prakash laid out a set of conditions by which the adoption of a policy by an authority exercising discretionary power would be valid. The conditions were that such a general policy will be valid if:

1. the policy is not Wednesbury unreasonable in the sense used in Associated Provincial Picture Houses v. Wednesbury Corporation (1947), that is, it is not "a decision that is so outrageous in its defiance of logic or accepted moral standards that no sensible person who applied his mind to the question to be decided could have arrived at it or that no reasonable person could have come to such a view";
2. in considering what constitutes "reasonableness", the courts are not to substitute their views of how the discretion should be exercised, and the plaintiff bears the burden of proving that the policy or guideline is illegal or ultra vires;
3. the guidelines must be made known to the persons affected; and
4. the authority must not fetter its "discretion in the future and is prepared to hear out individual cases or is prepared to deal with exceptional cases". In the formulation of this condition, the judge referred to the English cases of British Oxygen (1970) and Re Findlay (1984), and accepted that a decision-maker cannot fetter its discretion by rigid adherence to a policy.

On the facts of Lines International, the judge held that the policy satisfied all four conditions and that the adoption of the guidelines was valid. On the fourth consideration relating to fettering of discretion, the judge found that the PSA and STPB had not rigidly enforced the guidelines as they had made it clear at the meeting attended by the plaintiff that they would consider representations from cruise operators, and, in fact, a number of such concessions were made. Hence, the guidelines had been flexibly applied and the PSA had not fettered its discretion by rigidly adhering to a policy. The Lines International conditions were approved by the Court of Appeal in JD Ltd. v. Comptroller of Income Tax (2005).

Non-statutory rules or policies are "often drafted in a more flexible and less formalistic and precise way than statutory rules, thus leaving more leeway in their application". Such policies are often referred to as "soft law". Such soft law "may be understood as a descriptive umbrella for non-binding instruments containing recommendations or hortatory, programmatic statements, taking the form of informal rules like circulars, self-regulating codes of conduct or government white papers. These soft law instruments co-exist with 'hard' law and may have legal impact." It has been commented that the High Court's formulation of the Lines International conditions has given legal effect to informal rules or policies issued by public authorities.

==== Application of the conditions ====
The Lines International conditions were applied by a different High Court judge in the case of Borissik Svetlana v. Urban Redevelopment Authority (2009). The plaintiff argued that the Urban Redevelopment Authority ("URA") had not been transparent while processing her application for permission to redevelop her house, or had not given her case genuine consideration. The Court held that the URA had considered the planning approval application, and had explained to the plaintiff the implications of her proposal and had extended several invitations to discuss the proposal but the plaintiff had declined to amend her redevelopment plans. On these facts, the Court held that the URA had thoroughly considered the plaintiff's application and had not fettered its discretion.

The issue in the High Court decision Komoco Motors Pte. Ltd. v. Registrar of Vehicles (2007) and the appeal to the Court of Appeal from that decision, Registrar of Vehicles v. Komoco Motors Pte. Ltd. (2008), was whether the Registrar of Vehicles had acted correctly in relying on the open market value ("OMV") of vehicles determined by the Singapore Customs to calculate the additional registration fee ("ARF") payable on such vehicles. This practice, referred to as the "administrative convention" in the case, had existed for over 40 years. In the High Court, the judge found that the Registrar had fettered her discretion in relation to the valuation of the cars because, having instituted a policy of adopting the Customs' valuation of the OMV, she had not been prepared to hear out with an open mind Komoco's case that the ARF was incorrect. The judge dismissed the fact that the Registrar had held meetings with her senior officers and had taken extended periods of time to make a decision, holding that these did not show she had given genuine consideration to Komoco's case as "the passing of time [did] not by itself indicate how the time was used". The judge also found that the absence of the Registrar's comments on Komoco's arguments, especially on some which the judge found credible, strengthened the case that genuine consideration had not been given. Lastly, the judge held the Registrar had indicated that she had dealt with Komoco's representations with a predisposed frame of mind as her reply to Komoco was that "the policy was very clear" and that the ARF had been "computed based on the OMVs as assessed by Customs".

The High Court's decision was overruled by the Court of Appeal. The Court held that the Registrar had given genuine consideration to Komoco's arguments. It found that the Registrar had been entitled to take, prima facie, the Customs' OMV figures as correct unless they had been shown to be incorrect. Although the Registrar had been disposed to follow the Customs' OMV, she had equally been concerned to find out whether there had been sufficient reasons for her not to follow the administrative convention. Komoco had neither challenged the sworn evidence given by the Registrar by applying to cross-examine her, nor adduced any evidence to disprove the Registrar's sworn statement. There was thus no merit in Komoco's contention that the Registrar had not given genuine consideration to its representation. Furthermore, Komoco had not provided new evidence not already presented to the Customs to justify a departure from the administrative convention. Therefore, there had not been any compelling reason for the Registrar to re-evaluate her decision. She had adequately justified her refusal to depart from the policy, and had not fettered her discretion.

The principle against a public authority fettering its discretion by rigid adherence to a policy also applies to the exercise of discretionary police powers, as indicated by obiter dicta in the High Court case of Chee Soon Juan v. Public Prosecutor (2011). Although the case did not involve judicial review and did not specifically cite Lines International, Justice Woo Bih Li discussed the validity of a general police policy in the context of judicial review, opining that the adoption of a policy "determining that political activities as a class posed a greater threat to public order than commercial activities ... was not in itself offensive for the purposes of administrative law provided that the police do not fetter their discretion and remain prepared to consider the facts of each case".

== Fettering discretion by wrongful delegation of responsibility or powers ==
Where a statute gives a decision-maker a discretionary power, whether of a judicial, legislative or administrative nature, it is generally unlawful for the decision-maker to delegate that power to another person or body unless the statute itself expressly provides that this may be done. In exercising his discretionary powers, a government official is expected to "apply his own mind in the matter".

=== English position ===
==== Delegation of authority to an absolute body ====
The case of Ellis v. Dubowski (1921) lays down the principle that there can be no delegation of authority to an absolute body from which no right of appeal exists. In this case, a licensing committee exercising statutory powers to license cinemas to be used for film screenings had imposed a condition in a licence that films had to be certified by the British Board of Film Censors before they could be shown. This was found to be ultra vires because the Board should not be made the final dictator. Furthermore, the fact that the Board had been given absolute power to prohibit films for reasons which might be private or influenced by trade considerations was sufficient to render the condition ultra vires.

==== Nature of function delegated ====
The nature of the function delegated by a public authority is crucial in determining whether such delegation offends the law. Where functions are considered administrative, delegation may not be wrongful. In R. v. Race Relations Board, ex parte Selvarajan (1975), it was accepted that the Board could establish a committee in order to investigate and conduct preliminary inquiries, and that it was not practical for the whole body to be engaged in such a task. On the other hand, it is an established principle that no tribunal can delegate judicial or quasi-judicial functions such as disciplinary powers.

==== Delegation by minister ====
In the case of ministerial discretion, it has been established in Carltona Ltd. v. Commissioner of Works (1943) that it is not unlawful for a civil servant to take a decision on behalf of the minister, even where a statute confers discretion on a minister. Parliament will expect only that the power is to be exercised by an appropriate official. However, the minister is ultimately responsible for decisions taken on his or her behalf. While there has been discussion in case law about whether a minister should be required to personally exercise discretion in decisions that affect a person's liberty, the courts have usually been reluctant to hold so. Such a requirement, however, has been made by way of statutes which require the minister to act personally.

Although ministers are entitled to obtain views from other departments or ministries when making decisions, they must consider objections and not disable themselves from exercising their discretion. In H. Lavender and Son Ltd. v. Minister of Housing and Local Government (1969), the Housing Minister's decision was quashed because he had, by his stated policy, delegated to the Minister of Agriculture, Fisheries and Food the effective decision on any appeal where the latter had an objection.

=== Singapore position ===
==== Abdication of responsibility and delegation of powers to another agency ====
The English common law position that a public body cannot fetter its discretion by abdicating its responsibility and powers to another was discussed and adopted in Lines International. The general rules that Justice Prakash enunciated in the case are that, first, a public body has the duty to exercise discretion by itself; it cannot abdicate this responsibility by taking orders from other bodies unless it is under a legal duty to do so. Therefore, a condition in its policy that appeared to be a direction by the PSA to itself to take orders from either the Gambling Suppression Branch ("GSB") of the Singapore Police Force or STPB to deny berths to cruise vessels was a fetter on PSA's exercise of discretion and was held to be invalid. However, the invalid condition alone did not mean that the PSA had in fact fettered its discretion. The High Court stated that while the PSA had agreed to take orders from the GSB and STPB on the basis of the invalid condition, whether it had in fact done so was another matter. On the evidence, the Court went on to find that the PSA had in fact made its own decision in the matter.

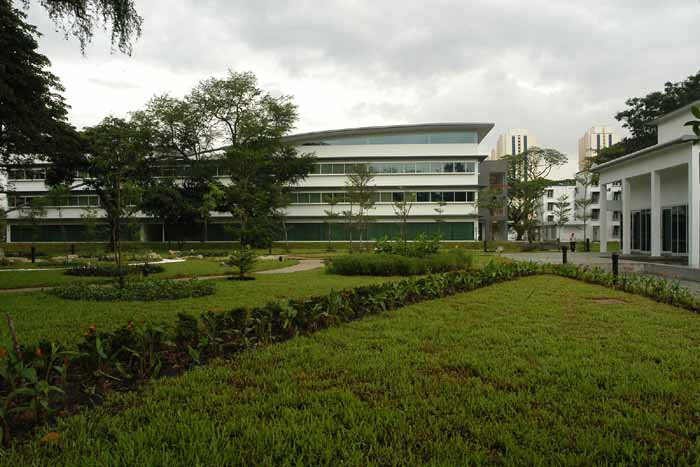
The headquarters of the Land Transport Authority at 1 Hampshire Road, Singapore. In a 2008 case, the Court of Appeal found that the Registrar of Vehicles had not fettered her discretion by abdicating her statutory power.

In Komoco Motors, the Court of Appeal held that the Registrar of Vehicles had not abdicated to the Customs her discretionary power. Expressing the view of the Court, Chief Justice Chan Sek Keong held that the Lines International conditions "although correct in law, [were] inapplicable to the factual context of the appeal". The Court distinguished the factual context in Lines International from the present case on two bases. First, it found that the Registrar had made the decision in the lawful exercise of her power and for practical reasons, which included the Customs' reliability in assessing the OMV of vehicles. In any case, an aggrieved importer had a statutory right to object to and be heard on the Customs' determination of OMVs. Secondly, while Lines International involved a determination of whether a vessel should be given berthing space, the PSA had to exercise its judgment as to how to weigh up various relevant factors. However, in Komoco Motors, once the Registrar had decided to adopt the Customs' OMV of a motor vehicle as its "value" for the purposes of the ARF Scheme, no further exercise of judgment was required of the Registrar. The Court held that the calculation of the ARF was simply an arithmetical exercise of applying the percentage stated in subsidiary legislation to the Customs' OMVs, and hence did not involve the taking of instructions by the Registrar from another statutory agency.

While the Court found that there was a suggestion that the Registrar could only decide whether to reconsider the ARF imposed on cars if she received Customs' further advice, she nevertheless had not abdicated her power as she could determine the value of vehicles, "after making such enquiries, if any, as [she] thinks fit". Thus, the Registrar did not need to make any inquiries at all as she had a reliable means of determining each vehicle's value. Furthermore, her statutory discretion was so wide that she could exercise it to determine the appropriate value of a motor vehicle in every case by relying on the Customs' OMV.

The plaintiff in Lines International argued that the guidelines adopted by the multi-agency committee set up by the PSA, STPB and GSB were invalid as the committee had no existence at law. The High Court held that there was nothing unlawful or even intrinsically wrong with these government agencies setting up such a committee to discuss matters of relevance to their respective jurisdictions as long as each agency made its own decisions within the ambit of its own statutory powers. The notion that such a committee fettered PSA's discretion was dismissed by a further finding of fact that the ad-hoc committee had not acted as an entity in itself. Enforcement and appropriate action were left to the agencies. A meeting attended by the plaintiff's representatives at which the guidelines relating to cruises-to-nowhere were announced was facilitated by a moderator rather than a chairperson, and each of the agencies read out guidelines which they themselves would be adopting and implementing.

==== Delegation by minister ====
Under section 35 of the Interpretation Act, if written law confers power on a minister to give a direction, issue an order or authorize something to be done, exercise of the power may be done (unless the law states otherwise) under the signature of the permanent secretary to the ministry which the minister is responsible for, or of any public officer authorized in writing by the minister. Section 36 of the Act permits a minister empowered to exercise a power or perform a duty to, in the absence of any statutory provision to the contrary, depute another person to exercise the power or perform the duty on his or her behalf. The delegation must be approved by the President (acting on Cabinet's advice); may be made subject to conditions, exceptions and qualifications; and must be published in the Government Gazette. The minister remains capable of exercising the power or performing the duty personally. The power to make subsidiary legislation cannot be delegated.

=== Relevance of delegatus non potest delegare maxim ===
The doctrine of wrongful delegation is sometimes said to be a reflection of the Latin maxim delegatus non potest delegare (a delegate cannot appoint another), which means that a body to which or person to whom power was delegated by Parliament cannot further delegate the power to another. Academics have submitted that the maxim does not state a rule of law, but is "at most a rule of construction" and in applying it to a statute "there, of course must be a consideration of the language of the whole enactment and of its purposes and objects". Thus, in reality, there is no such principle as delegatus non potest delegare; the maxim plays no real part in the decision of cases but is sometimes used as a convenient label. Consequently, in most cases the courts have adopted such a construction as will best accord with the facts of modern governmental agencies. For statutory powers, the important question is whether it is intended that a power conferred upon A may be exercised on A's authority by B. The maxim is merely the pencil with which the court is able to draw the line between authorized and unauthorized sub-delegation, and the courts must then ask whether statutory discretion remains in the hands of the proper authority, or whether some other person purports to exercise it. Thus where an Act said that an inspector of nuisances "may procure any sample" of goods for analysis, it was held that the inspector might validly send his assistant to buy a sample of coffee, as he had in no way authorized his assistant to exercise the discretion legally reposed in himself. Ultimately, the courts must decide the issue based on what Parliament has authorized according to what may be summarized as the language, scope and objects of the empowering statute.

== See also ==
- Carltona doctrine
- Judicial review in English law – Fettering discretion
