= Illegality in Singapore administrative law =

Singaporean judicial review doctrine

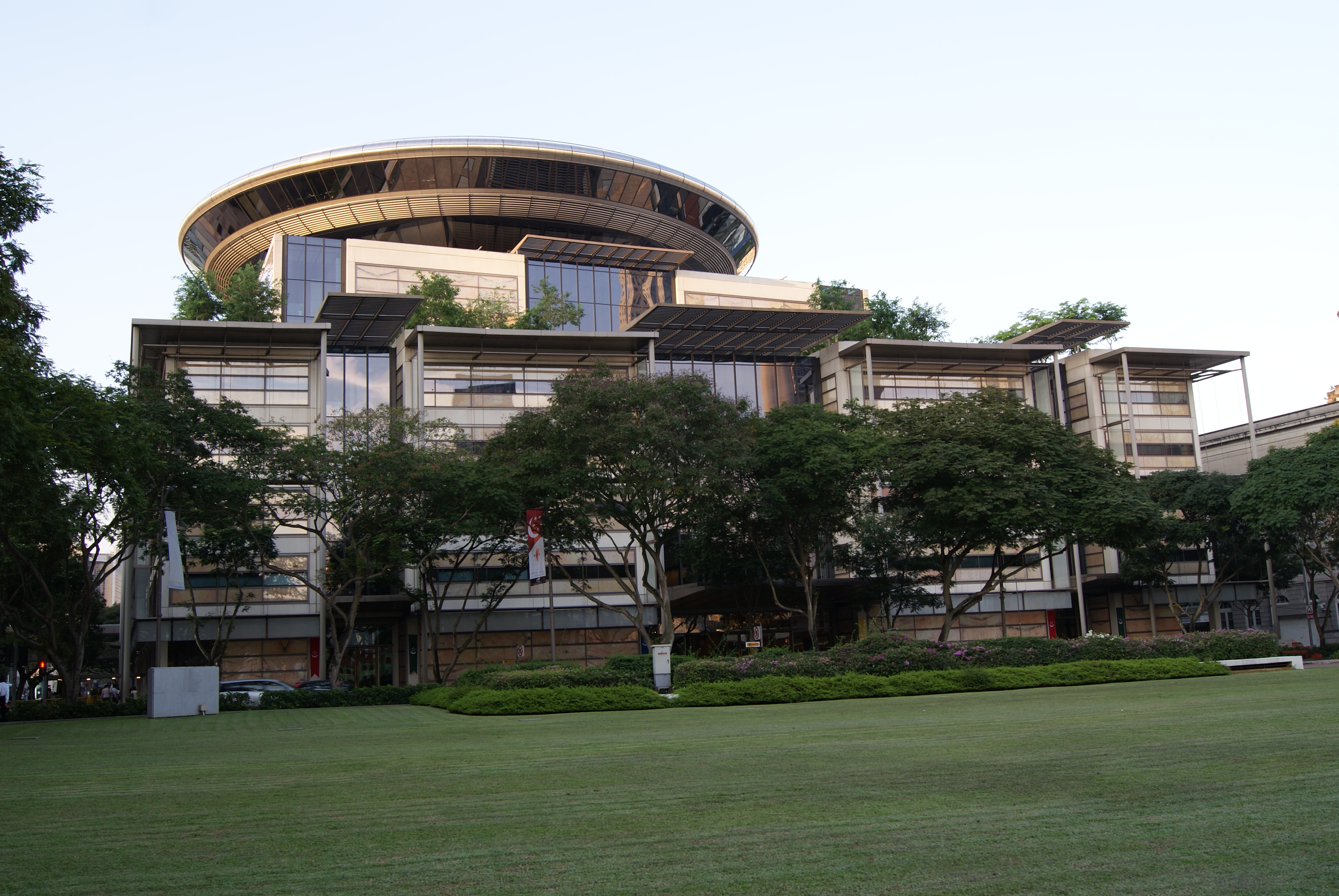
The Supreme Court of Singapore in August 2010. The building is the seat of the High Court, which carries out judicial review in administrative law.

Illegality is one of the three broad headings of judicial review of administrative action in Singapore, the others being irrationality and procedural impropriety. To avoid acting illegally, an administrative body or public authority must correctly understand the law regulating its power to act and to make decisions, and give effect to it.

The broad heading of illegality may be divided into two sub-headings. In the first case, the High Court inquires into whether the public authority was empowered to take a particular course of action or make a decision, and, in the other, whether it exercised its discretion wrongly even though it was empowered to act. Where the Court finds that the public authority had exceeded its jurisdiction or had exercised its discretion wrongly, it may invalidate the act or decision.

Under the first sub-heading, a public authority will be considered as having acted illegally if there is no legal basis for the action carried out or the decision made (simple ultra vires), or, more specifically, if the authority has made an error concerning a jurisdictional or precedent fact. A precedent fact error is made when an authority comes to a conclusion in the absence of facts that must objectively exist, or in the presence of facts that must not exist, before it has the power to act or decide.

In cases falling under the second sub-heading, a public authority has satisfied all the factual and legal conditions required for exercising a statutory power conferred upon it, but nevertheless may have acted illegally by doing so in a manner contrary to administrative law rules. The grounds of review available under this heading include the authority acting in bad faith, acting on the basis of no evidence or insufficient evidence, making an error of material fact, failing to take into account relevant considerations or taking into account irrelevant ones, acting for an improper purpose, fettering one's discretion, and not fulfilling a person's substantive legitimate expectations.

== Introduction ==
Illegality is one of the three broad headings of judicial review of administrative action identified in the key English case of Council of Civil Service Unions v. Minister for the Civil Service ("the GCHQ case", 1983), the others being irrationality and procedural impropriety. As Singapore inherited English administrative law on independence and the Singapore courts continue to follow English cases, the Court of Appeal of Singapore approved this principle in Chng Suan Tze v. Minister for Home Affairs (1988). In the GCHQ case, Lord Diplock formulated the concept of illegality as one where "the decision-maker must understand correctly the law that regulates his decision-making power and must give effect to it." Where the decision-maker fails to do so, the High Court may be empowered to quash the decision made or the action taken. Determining whether a decision-maker has acted illegally requires "delineating the scope of statutory powers, which is rarely a mechanistic exercise".

Prior to 1968, courts in the United Kingdom drew a distinction between jurisdictional and non-jurisdictional errors of law. An error of law that affected the jurisdiction of a decision-maker to exercise its statutory powers was judicially reviewable by the court, whereas an error of that did not go towards jurisdiction was not reviewable. However, the House of Lords is regarded as having effectively done away with the distinction in Anisminic Ltd. v. Foreign Compensation Commission (1968) by holding that:

... there are many cases where, although the tribunal had jurisdiction to enter on the inquiry, it has done or failed to do something in the course of the inquiry which is of such a nature that its decision is a nullity. It may have given its decision in bad faith. It may have made a decision which it had no power to make. It may have failed in the course of the inquiry to comply with the requirements of natural justice. It may in perfect good faith have misconstrued the provisions giving it power to act so that it failed to deal with the question remitted to it and decided some question which was not remitted to it. It may have refused to take into account something which it was required to take into account. Or it may have based its decision on some matter which, under the provisions setting it up, it had no right to take into account. I do not intend this list to be exhaustive. But if it decides a question remitted to it for decision without committing any of these errors it is as much entitled to decide that question wrongly as it is to decide it rightly.

In R. v. Lord President of the Privy Council, ex parte Page (1992), the House of Lords expressed the view that Anisminic had "rendered obsolete the distinction between errors of law on the face of the record and other errors of law by extending the doctrine of ultra vires. Thenceforward it was to be taken that Parliament had only conferred the decision-making power on the basis that it was to be exercised on the correct legal basis: a misdirection in law in making the decision therefore rendered the decision ultra vires." No case in Singapore has produced a similar opinion, but it appears that the Singapore courts adopt the same position, except perhaps where statutes contain ouster clauses.

The various grounds of review under the broad heading of illegality have also been termed "weak", "broad", or "general unreasonableness", to be contrasted with "strong" or Wednesbury unreasonableness. In Associated Provincial Picture Houses v. Wednesbury Corporation (1947), Lord Greene, the Master of the Rolls, remarked that "a person entrusted with a discretion must, so to speak, direct himself properly in law. He must call his own attention to the matters which he is bound to consider. He must exclude from his consideration matters which are irrelevant to what he has to consider. If he does not obey those rules, he may truly be said, and often is said, to be acting 'unreasonably.'"

== Types of illegality ==
The broad heading of judicial review of illegality may be divided into two sub-headings. In the first case, the High Court inquires into whether the public authority was empowered to take a particular course of action or make a decision, and, in the other, whether it exercised its discretion wrongly even though it was empowered to act. Where the Court finds that the public authority had exceeded its jurisdiction or had exercised its discretion wrongly, it may strike down the decision on the basis of illegality.

=== Whether the public authority was empowered to take action or make a decision ===
==== Simple ultra vires ====
A decision-maker is said to be acting ultra vires (beyond its powers) when it does not have the power it purported to have, and therefore there is no basis in law for the impugned action or decision. The ground of judicial review is termed "simple" to distinguish it from a broader conception of ultra vires developed by the courts that was referred to earlier, which essentially encompasses all the forms of illegality mentioned in the rest of this article.

As simple ultra vires concerns the exact powers conferred upon government ministers and statutory bodies, statutory interpretation is arguably the most important exercise the courts need to engage in to determine the scope of powers laid out in the statute. Hence, the cases decided are fact-specific and depend upon each court's interpretation of the relevant statute, making success of the judicial review somewhat unpredictable. The UK case of Attorney General v. Fulham Corporation (1921), illustrates this concept. The defendant was a statutory body establishing washhouses and baths for residents who could not afford their own washing facilities. When it subsequently established a laundry service, the defendant was declared to have acted ultra vires since its statutory purpose was not to carry on a business. Even though the business was carried out at a substantial loss, the statute in question did not give the defendant such a power to do so. Accordingly, the plaintiff was entitled to succeed.

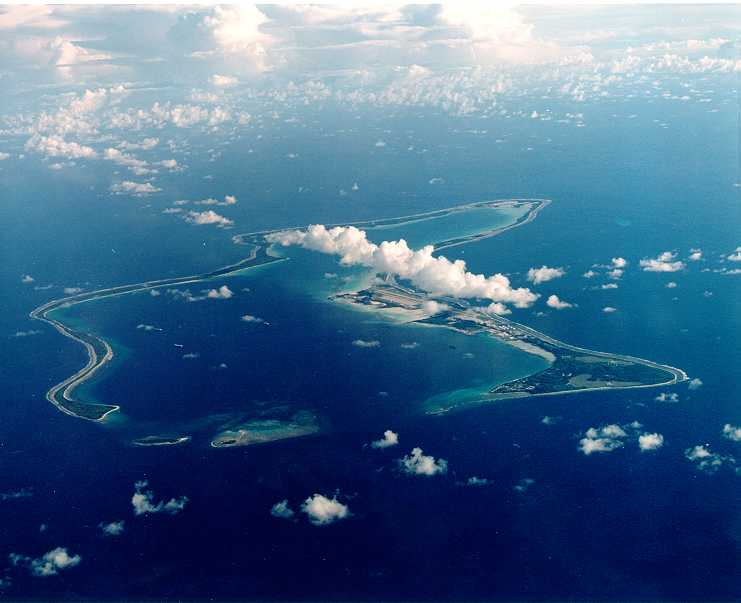
An aerial view of Diego Garcia in the British Indian Ocean Territory. In a 2000 case the High Court of England and Wales held that legislation excluding Chagossians from the atoll was ultra vires the Government's lawmaking powers, but this decision was overruled by the House of Lords in 2008.

R. (Bancoult) v. Secretary of State for Foreign and Commonwealth Affairs (2000), was a case concerning the forcible removal of the indigenous people of the Chagos Archipelago from Diego Garcia and the prohibition of their return by the Government of the United Kingdom so that the United States could construct a large military base there. This was effected by section 4 of the Immigration Ordinance 1971 of the British Indian Ocean Territory enacted pursuant to section 11(1) of the British Indian Ocean Territory Order, which states: "The Commissioner [for the British Indian Ocean Territory] may make laws for the peace, order and good government of the Territory, and such laws shall be published in such manner as the Commissioner may direct." The High Court held that the 1971 Ordinance was ultra vires the Order, since removing a people from their homeland could not be regarded as within the power to make laws for the territory's "peace, order and good government". Subsequently, the exclusion of the Chagossians from the land was reimposed by an Order in Council, the British Indian Ocean Territory (Constitution) Order 2004, which was made in the exercise of the royal prerogative. The legality of this Order was upheld by the House of Lords in R. (Bancoult) v. Secretary of State for Foreign and Commonwealth Affairs (No. 2) (2008), which overruled the earlier decision. The House of Lords took the view that the phrase "peace, order and good government" did not entitle the courts to substitute their own view on what the phrase required for that of the Government. Laws made pursuant to it were therefore not justiciable.

The simple ultra vires doctrine was implicitly applied by the High Court of Singapore in Wong Yip Pui v. Housing and Development Board (1984), in which the Court had to determine if the Housing and Development Board (HDB) had the power to compulsorily acquire a flat which had been sold to the plaintiff under the Housing and Development Act. Section 48A(1)(b) of the Act stated:

The Board may compulsorily acquire any flat, house or other living accommodation sold subject to the provisions of this Part, whether before or after the commencement of the Housing and Development (Amendment) Act, 1975 — ...

(b) if the owner thereof, his spouse or any authorised occupier has at any time, whether before or after the commencement of the Housing and Development (Amendment) Act, 1975, acquired whether by operation of law or otherwise any title to or an estate or interest in any other flat, house or building or land ... [Emphasis added.]

The phrase authorised occupier was defined in section 2(1) of the Act as "a person who is named in an application made to the Board as the person who intends to reside in the flat, house or other living accommodation sold or to be sold by the Board under Part IV or any person who is authorised in writing by the Board to reside therein". The HDB alleged that it was entitled to seize the plaintiff's flat as one of the authorised occupiers of the flat – his son – had acquired an interest in other real property. However, the Court held that, on the facts of the case, the plaintiff's son was not an authorised occupier as defined in the Act. The plaintiff had not applied to the HDB to buy the flat as he had, in fact, been invited by the HDB to buy it. Neither had the Board given any written authorization for the plaintiff's son to reside in the flat. Thus, the Court granted the plaintiff an order that the HDB's action in acquiring the flat was illegal, and that the flat should be revested in him.

In some instances, a statute does not clearly define what kinds of powers are conferred upon the relevant ministers and statutory bodies. In such a case, difficulty may arise when determining if the governmental action complained of was indeed ultra vires. The case of Public Prosecutor v. Pillay M.M. (1977) was one in which the High Court grappled with determining what powers were conferred on the Minister for Communications by section 90(1) of the Road Traffic Act. The respondent was charged with contravening the Motor Vehicles (Restricted Zone and Area Licences) Rules 1975 by driving his car into a restricted zone established under the Singapore Area Licensing Scheme without having paid the requisite fee for doing so. He submitted successfully before a magistrate that the Rules were ultra vires since section 90(1), which stated that the Minister could make rules "generally for the purpose of carrying this Act into effect", did not confer any power on the Minister to make rules prohibiting motor vehicles from using any road except upon payment of a fee.

On an appeal by the Public Prosecutor to the High Court, Chief Justice Wee Chong Jin accepted the appellant's submission that the Rules were intended to reduce traffic congestion within defined areas of the city, and thus were within the scope of section 90(1) since the long title of the Act indicated it was a statute "to make provisions for the regulation of traffic on roads", among other things. The primary purpose of the Rules was not the collection of fees but the regulation of traffic flow. The Chief Justice also disagreed with the respondent's submission that the Rules were ultra vires since section 90(1) only empowered the Minister to regulate road traffic and not to prohibit it entirely. In the judge's opinion, the Rules did not wholly prohibit vehicles from using roads within the restricted zone, but merely regulated traffic entering and remaining within the zone.

==== Errors as to precedent facts ====
===== Distinction between errors of fact and errors of law =====
It has been suggested that a question of fact involves a matter concerning primary facts such as a new witness or what people saw or heard, while a question of law involves an application of a statutory word or phase to such facts. However, this distinction is debatable, and the view has been taken that courts sometimes simply regard a matter as one involving an error of law if they wish to adopt an interventionist approach, and seek to allow judicial review to take place. In any case, it is said that the courts generally treat errors of fact committed by public authorities differently from errors of law. While errors of law are regarded by the courts as within their jurisdiction and thus subject to judicial review, they show more reluctance to intervene when errors of fact are alleged.

Cases involving questions of mixed fact and law are less straightforward. While there are no Singaporean cases that demonstrate this genre of case, the UK case of Puhlhofer v. Hillingdon London Borough Council (1986) held that:

Where the existence or non-existence of a fact is left to the judgment and discretion of a public body and that fact involves a broad spectrum ranging from the obvious to the debatable to the just conceivable, it is the duty of the court to leave the decision of that fact to the public body to whom Parliament has entrusted the decision-making power save in a case where it is obvious that the public body, consciously or unconsciously, are acting perversely.

The crux of the case was the interpretation of "homelessness" under the Housing (Homeless Persons) Act 1977, under which a public authority bore a statutory responsibility for providing homeless people with accommodation. The House of Lords ruled that the applicants, who were a married couple living with their two children in a single room in a guest house, were not "homeless" within the ordinary meaning of that expression, and thus were not entitled to relief under the Act.

===== Precedent fact errors =====
Although the courts will generally avoid judicially reviewing errors of fact, a decision may be quashed if an error was made concerning a jurisdictional or precedent fact. A precedent fact error is made when a decision-maker comes to a conclusion in the absence of facts that must objectively exist, or in the presence of facts that must not exist, before it has the power of decision under legislation. If, say, the statute requires that a particular precedent fact must exist before the decision-maker may exercise the power conferred on it by the legislature, in the absence of the fact there can be no lawful exercise of the power. This is a specific type of simple ultra vires and the discretion involved can be described as being in the "precedent fact category".

The case of Chng Suan Tze v. Minister for Home Affairs (1988) is the leading authority in Singapore law for the principle that the function of a court in the review of discretionary power depends on whether a jurisdictional or precedent fact was involved. Citing the UK case of Khera v. Secretary of State for the Home Department; Khawaja v. Secretary of State for the Home Department ("Khawaja", 1983). Chief Justice Wee Chong Jin, speaking on behalf of the Court of Appeal, held that the scope of judicial review of an executive decision depends on whether a precedent fact is involved. If the discretion falls outside the precedent fact category, the scope of judicial review is limited to the normal judicial review principles of illegality, irrationality (that is, Wednesbury unreasonableness) and procedural impropriety. On the other hand, if one or more precedent facts are involved, the scope of judicial review "extends to deciding whether the evidence justifies the decision".

However, the judge noted that whether a discretionary power is subject to any precedent fact depends on the construction of the legislation creating the power, and that it is open to Parliament to express its intention in plain and unequivocal words to take a discretion conferred on a public authority out of the precedent fact category, thus excluding judicial review of the discretion even if the liberty of a person affected by the exercise of the discretion is implicated. On the facts of the case, the discretion conferred on the President and the Minister for Home Affairs by sections 8 and 10 of the Internal Security Act to detain without trial persons believed to threaten national security, to suspend detentions and to revoke such suspensions, was held to fall outside the precedent fact category. Consequently, the Court could not go beyond determining if the detention decisions violated administrative law rules relating to illegality, irrationality or procedural impropriety.

=== Whether the public authority exercised its discretion wrongly ===
A public authority may have satisfied all the factual and legal conditions required for exercising a statutory power conferred upon it, but nevertheless may have acted illegally by doing so in a manner contrary to administrative law rules.

==== Bad faith ====
The act or decision of a public authority is challengeable if it acted in bad faith, that is, it "intentionally abused its power or was reckless as to whether it did so". Thus, the Singapore Court of Appeal held in Law Society of Singapore v. Tan Guat Neo Phyllis (2008) that the Attorney-General "may not use his prosecutorial power in bad faith for an extraneous purpose". The applicant must adduce sufficient evidence to prove bad faith; mere suspicion is inadequate. The court will consider all the evidence as well as any explanation provided by the respondent, and an inference against the respondent can be drawn if no explanation is given. In the UK context, bad faith is seldom relied on as a ground of review as it is absent in most cases, or difficult to prove.

==== No evidence and lack of evidence ====
Another exception to the general rule that courts will generally only judicially review errors of law is where action is taken or a decision is made on the basis of no evidence, a lack of sufficient evidence, or an error of material fact. In such situations, intervention by the High Court is warranted as the action or decision is factually unsustainable.

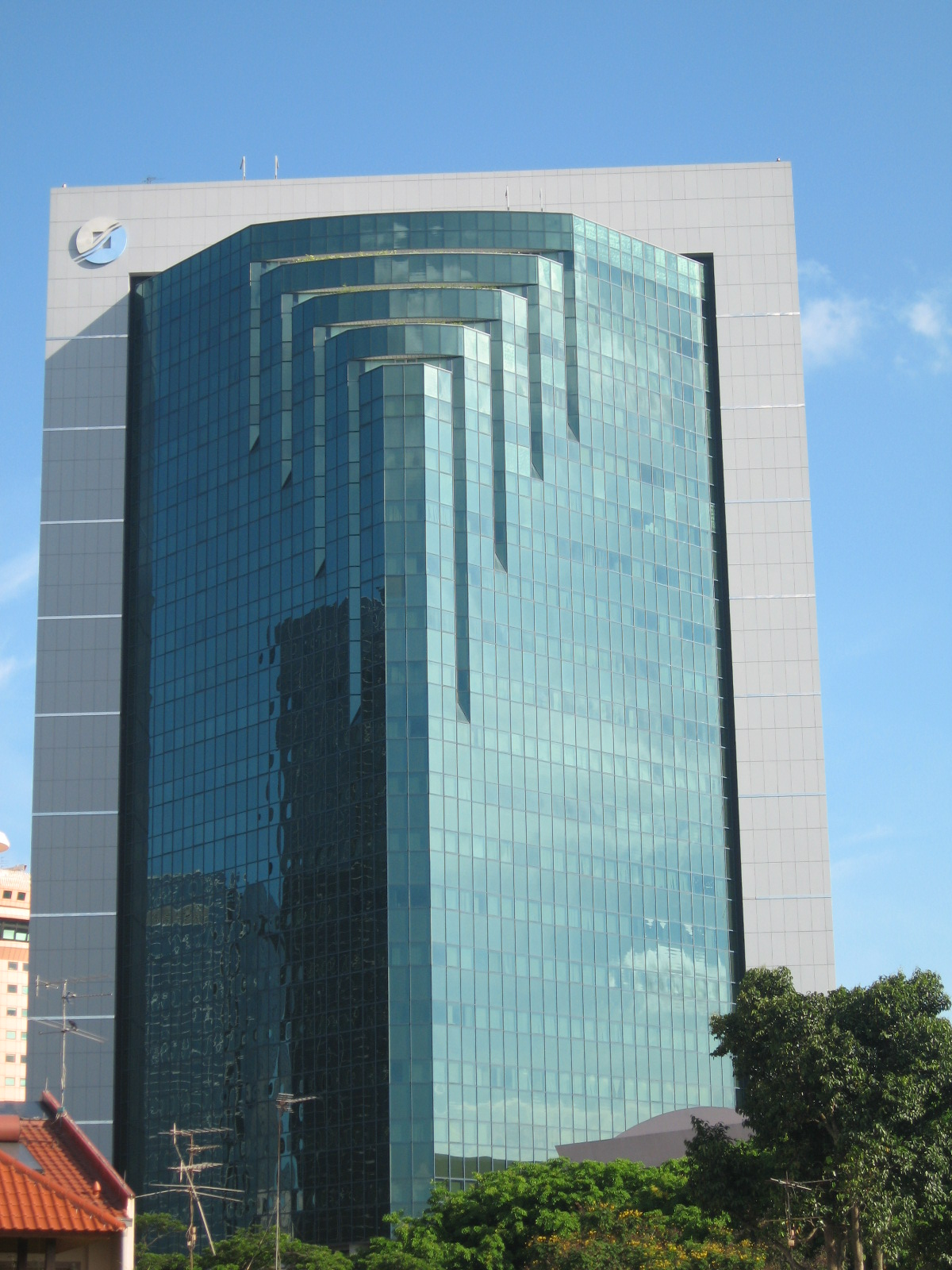
Revenue House, where Singapore Customs is based. In Re Fong Thin Choo (1991), the High Court held that it could judicially review a decision of the Director-General of Customs and Excise which was alleged to have been made on the basis of insufficient evidence.

The High Court case of Re Fong Thin Choo (1991) is authority for the fact that, in Singapore, a public authority's decision may be challenged on the ground that it is based on no evidence or insufficient evidence. In this case, the Court was asked to inquire into the decision of the Director-General of Customs and Excise to impose customs duty on certain goods that had been imported into the country by the applicant but allegedly not re-exported. In his judgment, Justice Chan Sek Keong endorsed the view of Lord Wilberforce in Secretary of State for Education and Science v. Tameside Metropolitan Borough Council (1976) that the court was "entitled to inquire into the existence of the facts upon which the evaluation was made". The test formulated requires the court to ask "whether the [decision-maker] could reasonably have come to [the] decision on the evidence before [it]".

A parallel reference may be made to the key UK case of Coleen Properties Ltd. v. Minister of Housing and Local Government (1971). It was held by the Court of Appeal of England and Wales that there was "no material" on which the Minister could have come to his decision to compulsorily acquire the property in question, and thus "the Minister was wrong and [the] court should intervene and overrule". Lord Justice Sachs put forth a higher threshold requirement of "clear and unambiguous evidence" to support the decision made, as compared to the more lenient test of whether there was evidence which would justify a reasonable person in reaching the conclusion which the public authority reached. The latter test may be more in line with that enunciated in Fong Thin Choo, as in that case the crux of judicial intervention hinges on the sufficiency of the evidence to allow the decision-maker to have reached the decision reasonably.

Coleen also underlines the larger question of how the ground of insufficiency of evidence relates to, and arguably may be subsumed under, other more established grounds of judicial review. The High Court in Fong Thin Choo drew a link between this ground and that of relevant and irrelevant considerations. Justice Chan held that the "insufficient inquiry" by the Director-General, which satisfied the ground of lack of evidence, constituted a "[failure] to take into account relevant considerations".

One criticism levelled against the ground of review is that it has the potential of allowing the court to overstep the scope of its power. Consequently, this erodes "tribunal autonomy". Since the Fong Thin Choo test recognizes the court's power to inquire into the evidence upon which the decision was based, this permits the court to examine the merits of the case. This is a departure from the traditional position, where the court restricts itself to assessing the legality of decisions. Nonetheless, it is only where the lack of evidence significantly affects the outcome of the decision that the court is willing to exercise its power of judicial review and intervene on this ground.

==== Errors of material fact ====
The High Court in Fong Thin Choo arguably recognized errors of material fact as a ground of review when it endorsed Lord Wilberforce's remarks in Tameside that if a judgment to be made by a public authority requires the existence of certain facts, the court must determine "whether the judgment has been made upon a proper self-direction as to those facts", and the court can interfere if the authority has acted "upon an incorrect basis of fact". In addition, in the judgment of the Court of Appeal of England and Wales in Tameside, Lord Justice Leslie Scarman said that judicial review can be exercised when there has been a "misunderstanding or ignorance of an established and relevant fact" by an authority.

In a UK development that has not yet been followed in Singapore, Lord Justice Robert Carnwath held in E v. Secretary of State for the Home Department ("E v. Home Secretary", 2004) that an error of material fact constitutes "a separate ground of review, based on the principle of fairness", and laid out four requirements that must be fulfilled to establish it:

First, there must have been a mistake as to an existing fact, including a mistake as to the availability of evidence on a particular matter. Secondly, the fact or evidence must have been "established", in the sense that it was uncontentious and objectively verifiable. Thirdly, the appellant (or his advisers) must not have been responsible for the mistake. Fourthly, the mistake must have played a material (not necessarily decisive) part in the tribunal's reasoning.

Law professor Paul Craig has taken the view that the effect of E v. Home Secretary is to entitle courts to intervene for all forms of mistake of fact, but that "such a development is not to be welcomed unreservedly, leading as it does to greater court intervention and a corresponding decrease in the autonomy of initial decision-makers". At the same time, the principles enunciated in E v. Home Secretary do encompass inherent restraints that limit the courts' scope of intervention. The requirement for the impugned fact or evidence to be "uncontentious and objectively verifiable" is "something that is often not the case in complex judicial review", and hence may limit potential challenges.

==== Relevant and irrelevant considerations ====
The High Court will enquire whether all considerations relevant to an act or decision have been taken into account by the decision-maker, and irrelevant ones ignored. If so, the act or decision stands, subject to other administrative law rules having been complied with. The primary concern of this ground of judicial review is not the merits of the decision itself. Rather, the focus is on the reasoning process by which the decision was reached. However, in the UK context it has been noted that "case law on relevant considerations can sometimes take the courts to the fringes of difficult social and economic choices and that (arguably) the courts have not always adopted a position of self-restraint".

The law relating to relevant and irrelevant considerations has developed substantially in the UK. In a dissenting opinion in R. v. Somerset County Council, ex parte Fewings (1995), Lord Justice Simon Brown identified three categories of considerations that decision-makers need to be aware of:

First, those clearly (whether expressly or impliedly) identified by the statute as considerations to which regard must be had. Second, those clearly identified by the statute as considerations to which regard must not be had. Third, those to which the decision-maker may have regard if in his judgment and discretion he thinks it right to do so.

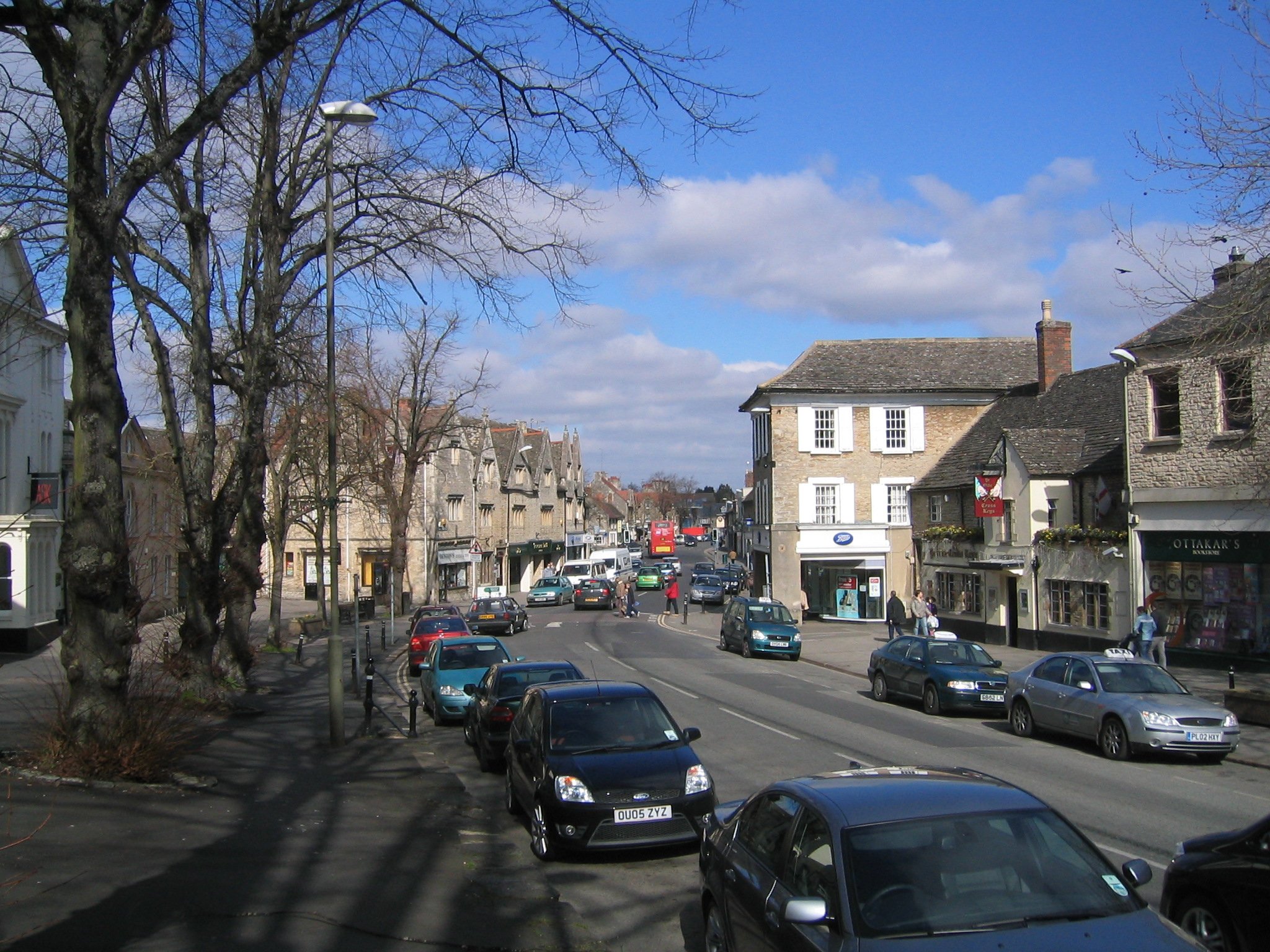
The high street of Witney, Oxfordshire. In a 1995 case involving a denial of planning permission to Tesco Stores for the construction of a retail food superstore in the town, the House of Lords held that so long that a decision-maker does not act in a Wednesbury-unreasonable manner, it is entitled to place on a relevant consideration whatever weight it sees fit.

The first and third types of consideration may respectively be called mandatory and discretionary relevant considerations. In respect of discretionary relevant considerations, Lord Justice Brown elaborated that there is "a margin of appreciation within which the decision-maker may decide just what considerations should play a part in his reasoning process", but that this is subject to the principles of Wednesbury unreasonableness.

The question of how much weight needs to be placed by the decision-maker on mandatory or discretionary considerations was addressed by the House of Lords in Tesco Stores Ltd. v. Secretary of State for the Environment (1995), a case involving planning permission. In his speech, Lord Hoffmann reiterated that the courts are concerned only with the legality of the decision-making process and not with the merits of the decision:

The law has always made a clear distinction between the question of whether something is a material consideration and the weight which it should be given. The former is a question of law and the latter is a question of planning judgment, which is entirely a matter for the planning authority. Provided that the planning authority has regard to all material considerations, it is at liberty (provided that it does not lapse into Wednesbury irrationality) to give them whatever weight the planning authority thinks fit or no weight at all. The fact that the law regards something as a material consideration therefore involves no view about the part, if any, which it should play in the decision-making process.

===== Failing to take into account relevant considerations =====
The Singapore case Chew Kia Ngee v. Singapore Society of Accountants (1988), though not a judicial review application, illustrates how a decision-maker acts incorrectly if it fails to take into account relevant considerations. The Disciplinary Committee of the Singapore Society of Accountants had found the appellant, an auditor, guilty of an act or default discreditable to an accountant within the meaning of section 33(1)(b) of the Accountants Act because an incomplete auditor's report form that he had signed in advance had accidentally been submitted to the Monetary Authority of Singapore. The Committee had ordered that he be suspended from practice for five years. The appellant appealed the decision to the High Court on the basis that the Committee had not taken into account all the relevant considerations of the case in arriving at its decision. The Court concurred, holding that the Committee had not properly considered that the appellant had reviewed the incomplete form with his audit manager and had instructed him how to fill in the rest of it. Therefore, this was not a case of an accountant recklessly signing a blank form without regard to his duties as an auditor. Accordingly, the Court allowed the appeal and set aside the Committee's order.

In the UK, the House of Lords has considered the relevance of the availability of financial resources to a public authority's decision. In R. v. Gloucestershire County Council, ex parte Barry (1997), the court held that it was relevant for Gloucestershire County Council, which had a statutory duty to provide home care services to elderly and frail people, to have considered the cost of doing so when determining whether they should be withdrawn. For instance, Lord Nicholls of Birkenhead said that "needs for services cannot sensibly be assessed without having some regard to the cost of providing them. A person's need for a particular type or level of service cannot be decided in a vacuum from which all considerations of cost have been expelled."

Barry was distinguished in the subsequent case R. v. East Sussex County Council, ex parte Tandy (1998), in which the reduction of home tuition services provided by East Sussex County Council to a young myalgic encephalomyelitis/chronic fatigue syndrome sufferer was challenged. The services were reduced due to a cut in the authority's home tuition budget. Lord Browne-Wilkinson, speaking for the House of Lords, noted that the statute in question in Barry had required the decision-maker to assess the "needs" of disabled people and whether arranging for home care services to be provided was "necessary in order to meet" those needs. The statute only listed the services that could be provided, and did not define what "needs" meant. Thus, it was "perhaps not surprising" that the court had laid down the availability of resources as a criterion for determining what should be considered "needs". On the other hand, in Tandy the statute involved imposed on the authority a duty to arrange to provide "suitable education" to the applicant, which was defined according to "wholly objective educational criteria". Financial resources were not mentioned at all. In the circumstances, the judge held that the extent of the latter was not a consideration relevant to the authority's decision. He also commented that since it had not been submitted that the authority lacked resources to perform its duty, this was a situation of the authority preferring to spend money on other matters. Thus, the authority could divert funds from discretionary matters and apply them to fulfil its statutory duty.

===== Taking into account irrelevant considerations =====
The decision of a public authority is subject to judicial review if the authority took into account irrelevant considerations in arriving at its decision. This is demonstrated by Tan Gek Neo Jessie v. Minister for Finance (1991). In this case, the Registrar of Businesses wrote to the applicant to direct her to change the name of her business, "JC Penney Collections", to one which did not use the name "JC Penney". At the time, there were two trade marks registered with the Registry of Trade Marks in Singapore under the name "Penneys". The proprietor of both trade marks was JC Penney Company Inc., a company incorporated in the United States. These trade marks had not been used in Singapore by the American corporation. The applicant appealed to the Minister for Finance against the decision of the Registrar, but the appeal was dismissed. The applicant subsequently applied for an order of certiorari (now referred to as a quashing order) to nullify the decisions of the Registrar and the Minister.

The Registrar said that, based on information it had obtained, the applicant had registered the business name with the ulterior motive of riding on the reputation of the American corporation. However, the Court noted that the while the test which the Registrar had applied could not be validly criticized, there was no evidence to support the conclusion that the Registrar had arrived at. At all material times, the American corporation had not carried on any business in Singapore. Neither had its trade mark "Penneys" ever been used in Singapore. It had no reputation in Singapore in relation to its business. As such, it could not be maintained that the applicant, in registering her business under the name "JC Penney Collections", had any ulterior motive of "riding on the reputation" of the American corporation. The Registrar and the Minister had, among other things, taken into account this irrelevant consideration in coming to their respective decisions to direct the applicant to change her business name and to dismiss her appeal against the direction. Accordingly, the court made an order of certiorari to quash both decisions.

==== Improper purposes ====
The basic principle that is applied by the courts is that where statute grants a power to a decision-maker for purpose A, it is unlawful for the decision-maker to exercise the power for purpose B, because the decision-maker would be using the power for an unauthorized purpose.

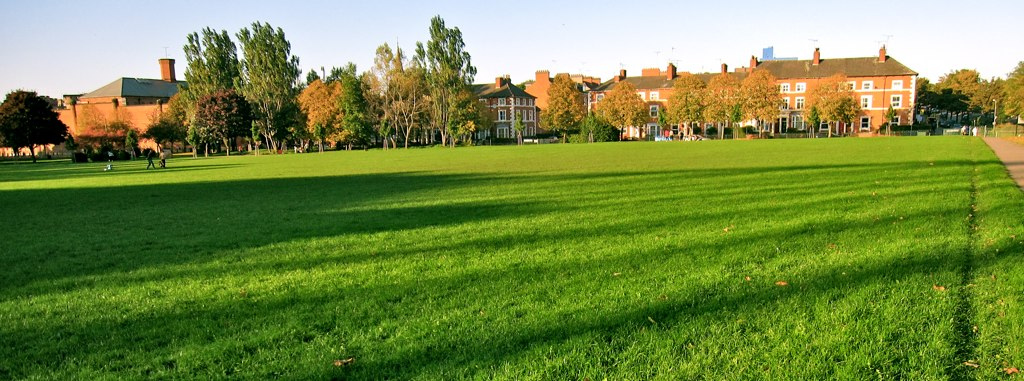
Nelson Mandela Park in Leicester, formerly known as Welford Road Recreation Ground, photographed in 2010. Leicester City Council prevented Leicester Football Club, a rugby club, from using the ground after some club members took part in a tournament in apartheid South Africa. In a 1985 judgment, the House of Lords held that the Council had exercised its power for an improper purpose.

A UK case in which improper purpose as a ground of judicial review was considered was Wheeler v. Leicester City Council (1985). Leicester City Council banned a rugby club, Leicester Football Club, from using one of its recreation grounds because some members of the club had taken part in a tournament in South Africa. At that time, the Government of South Africa practised apartheid, and the Council had a policy not to support this. However, the club members who travelled to South Africa, while not agreeing with apartheid, believed that the social barriers created by apartheid could be broken down by maintaining sporting links with the country. The club members had not acted unlawfully by choosing to participate in the tournament, and neither had the club by permitting them to do so. Lord Templeman said that:

... this use by the council of its statutory powers [to terminate the club's use of the recreation ground] was a misuse of power. The council could not properly seek to use its statutory powers of management or any other statutory powers for the purposes of punishing the club when the club had done no wrong.

In an earlier, more celebrated case, Padfield v. Minister of Agriculture, Fisheries and Food (1968), a group of farmers pressed the Milk Marketing Board to increase the prices for milk payable to them, but the Board refused. The farmers complained to the Minister of Agriculture, Fisheries and Food under section 19(3) of the Agricultural Marketing Act 1958. Under the section, the Minister had power to direct that a complaint be considered by the Committee of Investigation but he refused to exercise the statutory power and provided no reasons for his refusal. The farmers alleged misconduct on Minister's part. The House of Lords held that a minister's power under an Act is not unfettered, and that the Minister in question had effectively frustrated the objects of the statute as his non-exercise of the power had been based on a misunderstanding of the purpose for which the power was given to him. Parliament must have conferred the discretion with the intention that it should be used to promote the policy and objects of the Act, and the Minister could not act so as to frustrate the policy and objects of the Act.

A further example of an executive decision invalidated by improper purpose can be seen from Congreve v. Home Office (1976). In that case, the Home Secretary, who had the power to revoke television licences, purported to revoke the licences of people who had pre-empted a rise in licence fees by buying a licence at the old rate before the date when the fees were due to go up, even though their old licences had not yet expired. The court held that this was an improper exercise of the Home Secretary's discretionary powers. His power to revoke could not be used to raise revenue, and therefore this power had been used for the wrong purpose.

In the Singapore High Court case of Pillay, the Public Prosecutor appealed against a magistrate's decision that rules requiring people to pay a fee for a permit before driving motor vehicles into an area of the city designated as the "restricted zone" were ultra vires section 90(1) of the Road Traffic Act, the relevant part of which stated: "The Minister may make rules ... generally for the purpose of carrying this Act into effect ...". The respondent submitted that the primary purpose of the rules was to impose a fee on vehicles entering the restricted zone, and that section 90(1) did not empower the Minister to do so. The Court disagreed, holding that the Act empowered the Minister to make rules to regulate road traffic, and the purpose of the rules in question was not fee collection but to alleviate traffic congestion within the restricted zone. The fee imposed was "the means adopted to achieve the desired purpose and is merely incidental thereto". Law professor Thio Li-ann has commented that the Court's judgment, which appears to accept that an administrative measure need not relate directly to the purpose of a statute but may be incidental to it, "effectively gives the public body a great latitude to manoeuvre and formulate means which may have only a bare nexus with the statutory purpose".

===== Mixed purposes =====
It has been held in the UK that when a public authority exercises a statutory power for a number of purposes, some of which are unlawful, the applicable test for deciding whether the authority acted illegally is whether the unlawful purpose is incidental to the exercise of the power or if the dominant purpose is itself unlawful. If the primary or dominant purpose is the authorized purpose, the administrative action may be held valid.

In Westminster Corporation v. London and North Western Railway Co. (1905), the appellant had a statutory power to provide public sanitary conveniences and to construct these in, on, or under any road. It built an underground convenience on Parliament Street near Bridge Street in London with access to the pavement on either side of the street. London and North Western Railway Company, which owned property fronting Parliament Street and Bridge Street, objected to the construction. Lord Macnaghten considered whether the Corporation had constructed the subway "as a means of crossing the street under colour and pretence of providing public conveniences which were not really wanted at that particular place", which would not have been authorized by statute. He concluded that the Corporation's primary object had been to construct the public conveniences, together with proper means of approaching and exiting from them. Thus, the scheme was not unlawful.

==== Fettering discretion ====
It is illegal for a public authority to fetter its own decision-making power, either by adhering too strictly to a policy, or by making a decision on the basis of another person's decision or delegating the responsibility of the decision-making process to another person.

===== Application of a rigid policy =====
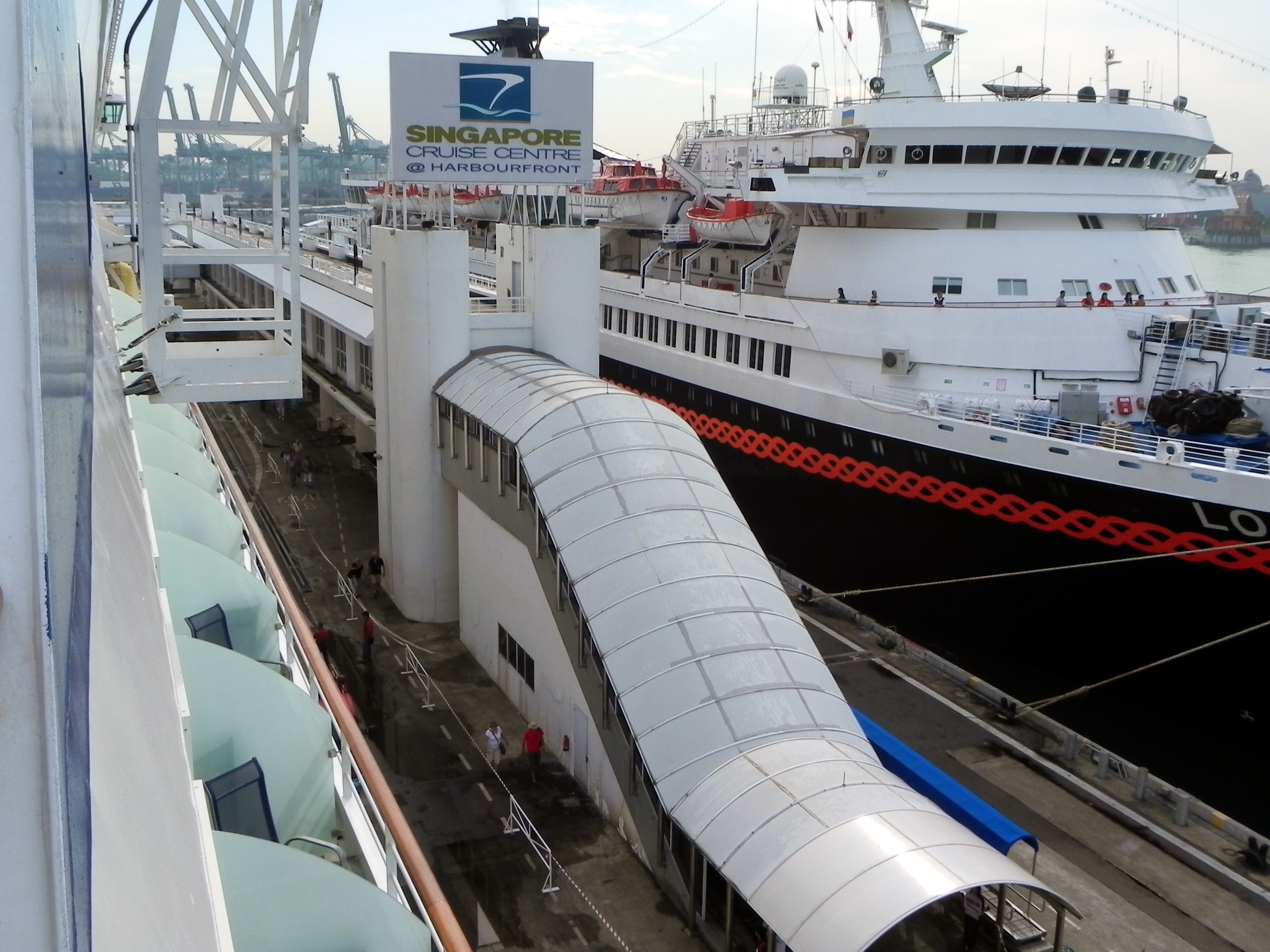
A ship berthed at the Singapore Cruise Centre in December 2010. In a 1997 case, the High Court held, among other things, that the Port of Singapore Authority had not fettered its discretion by rigidly applying a policy to restrict the number of "cruises-to-nowhere", which were mainly for gambling purposes.

An authority's discretion is fettered when it adheres strictly or rigidly to policy guidelines. The general rule is that anyone who has to exercise a statutory discretion must not "shut his ears to an application". However, if limits are placed on the exercise of discretion, this does not necessarily mean that the authority's decision is fettered. In Lines International Holding (S) Pte. Ltd. v. Singapore Tourist Promotion Board (1997), one of the issues before the Singapore High Court was whether the Port of Singapore Authority (PSA) had fettered its discretion by applying a guideline of not allocating berths at the Singapore Cruise Centre to cruise ships unless over a three-month period 30% or fewer of the cruises in a cruise operator's schedule consisted of "cruises-to-nowhere". Such cruises, which left Singapore's territorial waters and returned to Singapore without calling at any other destination port, tended to be mainly for gambling purposes.

The Court held that a body exercising administrative discretion is entitled to adopt a general policy to guide it in exercising its statutory duties and powers without having to pass regulations or by-laws, provided that the following requirements are met:

- The policy is not Wednesbury-unreasonable. In assessing whether policies fall foul of this rule, a court cannot reject the way in which an administrative body formulated a policy in favour of its own view of how the discretion should have been exercised. Furthermore, a policy is not Wednesbury-unreasonable if the court simply feels that it may not work effectively.
- The policy is made known to affected persons.
- The administrative body is "prepared to hear out individual cases or is prepared to deal with exceptional cases".

The Court ruled that the first two requirements had been satisfied, and that the guideline had not been rigidly enforced because the PSA had been willing to consider representations from cruise operators like the plaintiff, and, if the circumstances required, the PSA had been willing to grant an exception to the 30% restriction rule. Moreover, a number of concessions had in fact been made by the PSA.

===== Acting under dictation and improperly delegating power =====
A public authority is not permitted to base its decision upon another person's instruction, or to ask someone to decide on its behalf. In Lines International, the plaintiff alleged that the PSA had fettered its discretion by acting under dictation since one of the conditions for the allocation of berths was the following:

The Port of Singapore Authority will refuse allocation of berth to a vessel if the Gambling Suppression Branch, CID [Criminal Investigation Department] and Singapore Tourist Promotion Board so [sic] determine that such action is necessary.

The High Court agreed with the plaintiff that since the PSA had authority to decide how to allocate berths, it was also entrusted with the duty to exercise that discretion after taking various key factors into consideration, and would have acted unlawfully if it had abrogated its responsibility by taking orders from other public authorities such as the Gambling Suppression Branch or the Singapore Tourist Promotion Board unless it was under a statutory duty to do so. However, on the facts of the case, the decision to deny berths to the plaintiff's cruise ship had been taken by the PSA alone.

The legal principle laid down in Lines International was approved by the Court of Appeal in Registrar of Vehicles v. Komoco Motors Pte. Ltd. (2008), but found not to apply on the facts. The relevant issue was whether the Registrar of Vehicles, in order to determine the "additional registration fee" ("ARF") payable on motor vehicles by importers, had fettered her discretion by adopting the "open market value" ("OMV") which the Singapore Customs assigned to such vehicles. The Court held that by adopting this practice, the Registrar had not taken instructions from the Customs as she was permitted by rule 7(3) of the Road Traffic (Motor Vehicles, Registration and Licensing) Rules to exercise discretion to determine the value of motor vehicles by relying on the Customs' OMVs. Furthermore, unlike the situation in Lines International where PSA had to exercise judgment in weighing up various factors to determine whether a cruise ship should be allocated berthing space, once the Registrar had decided to adopt the Customs' OMVs, the ARFs were determined by applying a mathematical formula. The Registrar neither needed to exercise any further discretion, nor take instructions from any public authority such as the Customs.

==== Substantive legitimate expectation ====
Under UK law, a public authority may be prevented from going back on a lawful representation that an individual will receive or continue to receive a substantive benefit of some kind, even if he or she does not have a legal right to the benefit, because the representation gives rise to a legitimate expectation. That expectation may arise from a promise made by the authority, or from a consistent past practice. As the expectation must be a "reasonable" one, a person's own conduct may deprive him or her of any expectations he or she may have of legitimacy. The courts take three practical questions into consideration in determining whether to give effect to an applicant's legitimate interest:

- whether a legitimate expectation has arisen as a result of a public body's representation;
- whether it is unlawful for the public body to frustrate the legitimate expectation; and
- if so, what the appropriate remedy is.

As regards the first question, in Borissik v. Urban Redevelopment Authority (2009), the Singapore High Court adopted four conditions set out in De Smith's Judicial Review (6th ed., 2007) to determine whether a legitimate expectation has been created. The public body's representation must be clear, unambiguous and devoid of any relevant qualification; induced by the conduct of the decision-maker; made by a person with actual or ostensible authority; and applicable to the applicant, who belongs to the class of persons to whom the representation is reasonably expected to apply.

As regards the second question, in R. v. North and East Devon Health Authority, ex parte Coughlan (1999), the Court of Appeal of England and Wales identified three categories of legitimate expectations. Category (b) involves procedural legitimate expectations, and so are not discussed here because breaches of them are a form of procedural impropriety rather than illegality. Categories (a) and (c) relate to substantive legitimate expectations. Category (a) cases are those which lie "in what may inelegantly be called the macro-political field". The public authority "is only required to bear in mind its previous policy or other representation, giving it the weight it thinks right, but no more, before deciding whether to change course", and the court may only review the authority's decision on the ground of Wednesbury unreasonableness. On the other hand, category (c) cases are usually those "where the expectation is confined to one person or a few people, giving the promise or representation the character of a contract". When assessing such a case, the court decides whether for a public authority to frustrate an expectation is so unfair that it amounts to an abuse of power. The court must weigh the requirements of fairness towards the individual against any overriding interests relied by the authorities to justify the change of policy. A slightly different approach has been adopted by Lord Justice John Laws. In R. v. Secretary of State for Education and Employment, ex parte Begbie (1999), he suggested that the Coughlan categories are not "hermetically sealed", and in Nadarajah v. Secretary of State for the Home Department (2005), he expanded on this by taking a proportionality approach:

[A] public body's promise or practice as to future conduct may only be denied ... in circumstances where to do so is the public body's legal duty, or is otherwise ... a proportionate response (of which the court is the judge, or the last judge) having regard to a legitimate aim pursued by the public body in the public interest.

Where the third question is concerned, where a person convinces the court that his or her substantive legitimate expectation has been frustrated, the usual remedy is for the court to order that the public authority fulfil the expectation. However, in R. (Bibi) v. Newham London Borough Council (2001) it was held that when the decision in question is "informed by social and political value judgments as to priorities of expenditure" it is more appropriate for the authority to make the decision, and the court may order that the authority should merely reconsider its decision, taking into account the person's substantive legitimate expectation.

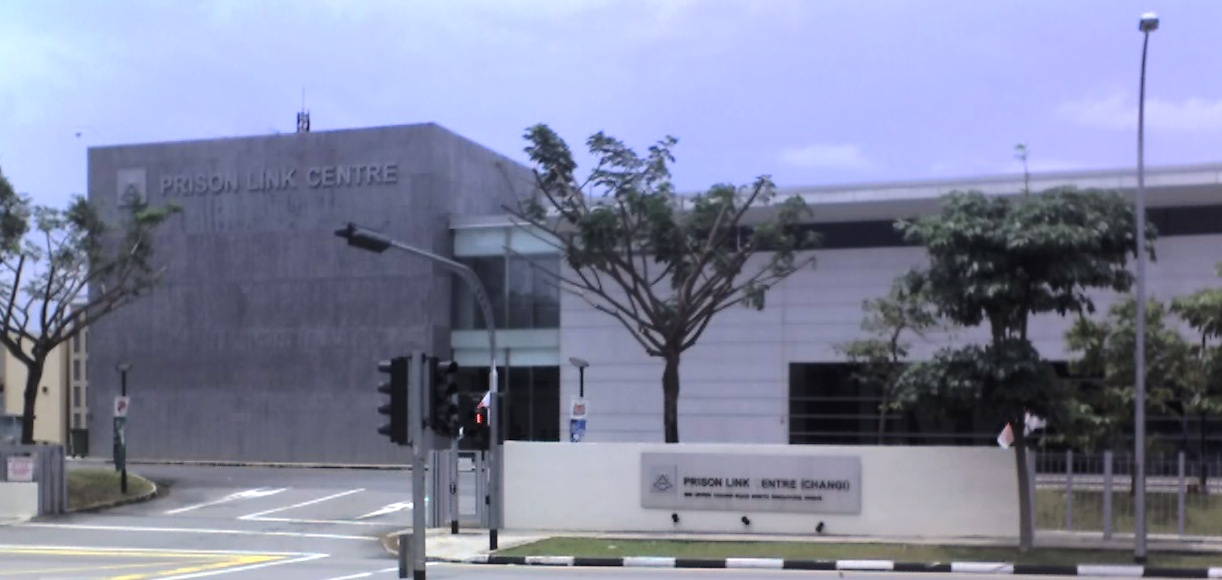
The Prison Link Centre of the Changi Prison Complex. The Court of Appeal referred to the doctrine of substantive legitimate expectation in a 1997 case concerning the meaning of life imprisonment, but did not explicitly endorse it.

The doctrine of substantive legitimate expectation has not yet been explicitly acknowledged as part of Singapore law. In Abdul Nasir bin Amer Hamsah v. Public Prosecutor (1997), the Singapore Court of Appeal had to decide whether life imprisonment in the Penal Code meant imprisonment for 20 years, which was the prevailing understanding, or whether it meant imprisonment for the remaining period of the convicted person's natural life. The Court concluded that the latter interpretation was correct, but overruled the former interpretation prospectively such that it only took effect from the date of the judgment and did not apply to the appellant. One of the reasons the Court relied on for doing so was the administrative law doctrine of legitimate expectation. It recognized that "certain legitimate expectations could, in certain circumstances, be deserving of protection, even though they did not acquire the force of a legal right". Since for many years life imprisonment had been reckoned as 20 years' incarceration, this had given rise to a legitimate expectation according to which individuals had arranged their affairs. Thus, the Court ought to give effect to the expectation by prospectively overruling the prior interpretation. Nonetheless, the Court stated: "[W]e were not concerned with judicial review, nor were we deciding whether any claim of a legitimate expectation could estop the Prisons Department in future from applying the interpretation which we gave to life imprisonment. That was a separate matter which was not under consideration here."

In Borissik, the applicant and her husband were joint owners of a semi-detached house with a plot size of around 419 square metres (4,510 sq ft) which was attached to another semi-detached house with a plot size of around 244.5 square metres (2,632 sq ft). In 2002, the Urban Redevelopment Authority (URA) revised its guidelines for the redevelopment of semi-detached houses, now permitting a semi-detached house to be converted to a detached house if and only if both the semi-detached plot and its adjoining semi-detached plot each had a size of at least 400 square metres (4,300 sq ft). On the basis of this guideline, the URA rejected the application submitted by the applicant and her husband to demolish their semi-detached house and replace it with a detached house. Dissatisfied, the applicant applied for a mandatory order for approval to be granted. One of her arguments was that she had a legitimate expectation that her proposal would be approved on the basis of the old guidelines; in other words, she sought fulfilment of a substantive legitimate expectation. In the end, the High Court decided that the URA had made no clear representation to her. She could neither show that any person with actual or ostensible authority had made any promise to her, nor that the URA's officers had acted in a way to lead her to have a legitimate expectation that her redevelopment plans would be approved. Chief Justice Chan Sek Keong has cautioned against reading the case as an implicit acknowledgement that legitimate expectations can be substantively enforced. He noted that "there is good reason for judges in Singapore to tread carefully, stepping gingerly on each stone in crossing the river".

In UDL Marine (Singapore) Pte. Ltd. v. Jurong Town Corp. (2011), the High Court "entertain[ed] some doubt" as to whether the doctrine of substantive legitimate expectation is part of Singapore law, but did not discuss the matter further as neither the respondent nor the Attorney-General had made submissions on the issue.
