= Wednesbury unreasonableness in Singapore law =

Singaporean legal doctrine

Wednesbury unreasonableness is a ground of judicial review in Singapore administrative law. A governmental decision that is Wednesbury-unreasonable may be quashed by the High Court. This type of unreasonableness of public body decisions was laid down in the English case of Associated Provincial Picture Houses v. Wednesbury Corporation (1947), where it was said that a public authority acts unreasonably when a decision it makes is "so absurd that no sensible person could ever dream that it lay within the powers of the authority".

Wednesbury unreasonableness was subsequently equated with irrationality by the House of Lords in Council of Civil Service Unions v. Minister for the Civil Service (the GCHQ case, 1983). These cases have been applied numerous times in Singapore, though in some decisions it is not very clear whether the courts have applied such a stringent standard.

In the UK, courts have applied varying standards of scrutiny when assessing whether a governmental decision is Wednesbury-unreasonable, depending on the subject matter and general context of the case. There do not appear to be any Singapore cases adopting an "anxious scrutiny" standard. On the other hand, a few cases can be said to have applied a "light touch" standard where questions of public order and security have arisen. There are suggestions in the UK that a doctrine of proportionality should supplant or be merged into the concept of Wednesbury unreasonableness; thus far, such an approach has not been taken up in Singapore. It is said that in holding that a decision is disproportionate, there is a higher danger that the court might be substituting its view for the decision-maker's.

== Development and application ==
=== At common law ===
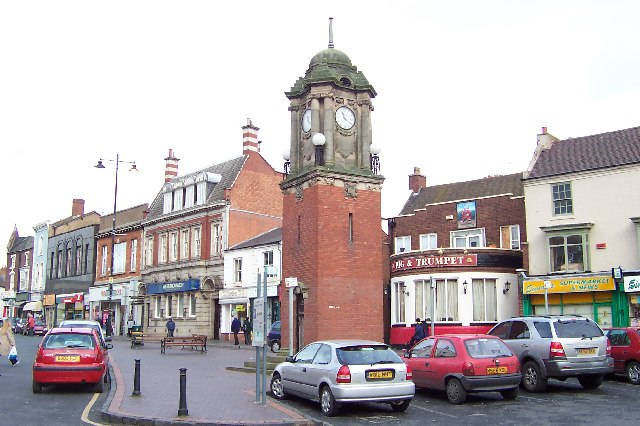
The High Street of the market town of Wednesbury in the West Midlands, England. A challenge to a decision of the local authority in Wednesbury to ban children under 15 years from going to the cinema on Sundays led to a 1947 case that introduced the concept of Wednesbury unreasonableness.

Wednesbury unreasonableness is a "shorthand legal reference" to the classical common law judicial approach expounded in the English case of Associated Provincial Picture Houses v Wednesbury Corporation (1947). In that case, Lord Greene, the Master of the Rolls, described two forms of unreasonableness. First, unreasonableness can be a general description of a public authority doing things that must not be done, such as not directing itself properly in law by considering matters which it is not bound to consider and taking into consideration irrelevant matters.

Another type of unreasonableness occurs when a public authority does something that is "so absurd that no sensible person could ever dream that it lay within the powers of the authority", as illustrated by the dismissal of a teacher because of her red hair. The latter has now come to be termed as Wednesbury unreasonableness. However, Lord Greene recognised that these aspects of unreasonableness are by no means clear, and "all these things run into one another".

Wednesbury unreasonableness was subsequently reformulated by the House of Lords in Council of Civil Service Unions v Minister for the Civil Service (the GCHQ case, 1983). Lord Diplock stated that it applies to a "decision which is so outrageous in the defiance of logic or of accepted moral standards that no sensible person who had applied his mind to the question to be decided could have arrived at it". Evidently, this is a much higher standard than ordinary unreasonableness. A governmental decision that is Wednesbury-unreasonable may be quashed or invalidated by a court.

In R v Secretary of State for the Home Department, ex parte Brind (1991), Lord Ackner said that although the standard of Wednesbury unreasonableness had been criticised as too high:

it has to be expressed in terms that confine the jurisdiction exercised by the judiciary to a supervisory, as opposed to an appellate, jurisdiction. Where Parliament has given to a minister or other person or body a discretion, the court's jurisdiction is limited, in the absence of a statutory right of appeal, to the supervision of the exercise of that discretionary power, so as to ensure that it has been exercised lawfully. It would be a wrongful usurpation of power by the judiciary to substitute its, the judicial view, on the merits and on that basis to quash the decision. If no reasonable minister properly directing himself would have reached the impugned decision, the minister has exceeded his powers and thus acted unlawfully and the court in the exercise of its supervisory role will quash that decision. Such a decision is correctly, though unattractively, described as a "perverse" decision. To seek the court's intervention on the basis that the correct or objectively reasonable decision is other than the decision which the minister has made is to invite the court to adjudicate as if Parliament had provided a right of appeal against the decision – that is, to invite an abuse of power by the judiciary.

=== In Singapore ===
Lord Diplock's threefold classification of the grounds of judicial review in the GCHQ case – illegality, irrationality and procedural impropriety – was adopted by the Singapore Court of Appeal in Chng Suan Tze v. Minister for Home Affairs (1988). Lord Diplock in the GCHQ case preferred to use the term irrationality to describe Wednesbury unreasonableness, and there is some uncertainty as to whether both concepts refer to the same thing. However, Singapore courts have stated that the test for irrationality is that of Wednesbury unreasonableness. In cases such as Re Siah Mooi Guat (1988), Kang Ngah Wei v. Commander of Traffic Police (2002), and Mir Hassan bin Abdul Rahman v. Attorney-General (2009), the courts applied the test of irrationality set out in the GCHQ case.

The same test for Wednesbury unreasonableness was referred to in other cases like Lines International Holding (S) Pte. Ltd. v. Singapore Tourist Promotion Board (1997), Chee Siok Chin v. Minister for Home Affairs (2006), and City Developments Ltd. v. Chief Assessor (2008). However, the courts also considered whether the decision-makers had taken irrelevant factors into account in deciding whether the decision was unreasonable in the Wednesbury sense. This is not necessarily inconsistent with Wednesbury unreasonableness as Lord Greene said that taking extraneous factors into account could be seen an aspect of such unreasonableness.

It has been said that the nuances of the term reasonable may have allowed the UK courts to deal with the merits of grievances rather than questions of legality, and hence to engage in judicial policy-making. However, it seems that Singapore courts have so far avoided substituting their opinion for that of decision-makers in applying the Wednesbury test. In Lines International, the High Court clearly noted that in considering Wednesbury unreasonableness courts are not entitled to substitute their views of how the discretion should be exercised, nor is unreasonableness established if the court is of the view that the policy or guideline may not work as effectively as another.

This principle has been adopted and emphasised in subsequent cases. In City Developments the court declined to interfere with the Chief Assessor's assessment of the annual value of the applicant's real property for property tax purposes, finding his explanations logical and commonsensical. The courts came to similar conclusions in Chee Siok Chin and Kang Ngah Wei.

== Levels of scrutiny ==
English cases dealing with Wednesbury unreasonableness demonstrate varying levels of scrutiny. The intensity of judicial review varies with the subject matter of the decision, ranging from "anxious scrutiny" to "light touch" review.

=== "Anxious scrutiny" review ===
"Anxious scrutiny" review refers to a more stringent level of scrutiny that is applied when the subject matter of a decision by a public authority relates to human rights. The term originates from the judgment of Lord Bridge of Harwich in R v Secretary of State for the Home Department, ex parte Bugdaycay (1986), where his Lordship said: "The most fundamental of human rights is the individual's right to life and when an administrative decision under challenge is said to be one which may put the applicant's life at risk, the basis of the decision must surely call for the most anxious scrutiny".

This approach can be seen to be in line with the UK judiciary's increasing focus on human rights protection, particularly after the entry into force of the Human Rights Act 1998 in 2000, which permits persons aggrieved by infringements of the European Convention of Human Rights (ECHR) to seek a remedy in domestic law. Essentially, this standard of scrutiny is much easier to satisfy, as it lowers the threshold of what constitutes a decision so outrageous that it may be deemed unreasonable in the Wednesbury sense. Such a "rights-based" approach allows courts to scrutinise cases involving fundamental human rights more closely, thereby affording greater protection of fundamental liberties.

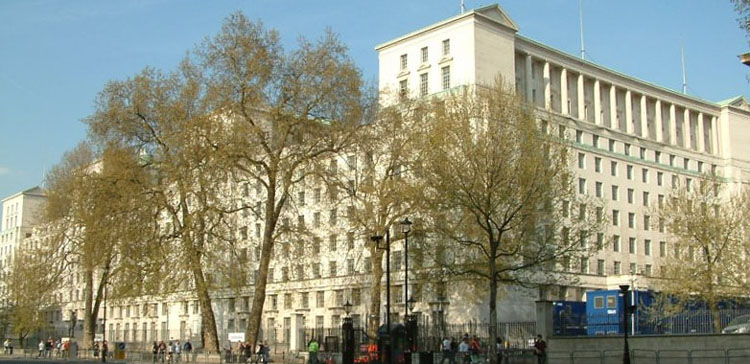
The headquarters of the UK Ministry of Defence (MoD) in the Main Building at Whitehall, London. In 1995, the Court of Appeal held in a case challenging the MoD's policy of discharging homosexual persons that a lower standard of Wednesbury unreasonableness applies when a decision interferes with human rights.

An instance of the application of the anxious scrutiny level of review is the 1995 case of R. v. Ministry of Defence, ex parte Smith, which represents a distillation of principles embodied in decisions previously made by the House of Lords in Ex parte Bugdaycay (1986) and Ex parte Brind (1991). In Ex parte Smith, Smith and three other individuals appealed a Ministry of Defence ruling that mandated the discharge of homosexuals from the service. The court accepted that "[t]he more substantial the interference with human rights, the more the court will require by way of justification before it is satisfied that the decision is reasonable". This is as long as the decision remains within the range of responses open to a reasonable decision-maker.

The anxious scrutiny standard has not been applied thus far in Singapore. The prevailing judicial philosophy is that of deference to Parliament. This is despite the courts' general adoption of Lord Diplock's arguably pro-rights stand taken in the case of Ong Ah Chuan v. Public Prosecutor (1980). This Privy Council case stated that judges should give constitutional provisions a generous interpretation to avoid the "austerity of tabulated legalism" and to provide individuals with their full measure of fundamental liberties. The generally deferential stance of the courts shows an inclination towards a strict separation of powers based upon the judiciary's belief that the Parliament is the only organ with the moral legitimacy to decide issues relating to social policy.

=== "Light touch" review ===
"Light touch" review demands that only perversity or absurdity amounting to bad faith or misconduct of an extreme kind will satisfy the threshold of unreasonableness. In Nottinghamshire County Council v. Secretary of State for the Environment, Transport and the Regions (1985), the House of Lords held that bad faith or an improper motive or the fact "that the consequences of [the decision-maker's] guidance were so absurd that he must have taken leave of his senses" must be proven before the court will interfere. Such a strict level of scrutiny is commonly applied by courts where matters of public expenditure or government policy are involved, and evidently reflects a "high-water mark of judicial self-restraint".

An apt example is the case of R v Secretary of State for Home Department, ex parte Cheblak (1991). This case involved the detention of a foreign citizen living in the UK on the ground of it "being conducive to the public good" under section 18(1)(b) of the Immigration Act 1971 as his presence would cause an unacceptable national security risk. The court rejected the application for judicial review on the ground that such matters were best left to the government. It would only intervene if the Secretary of State "in any way overstepped the limitations upon his authority which are imposed by the law" or acted in bad faith.

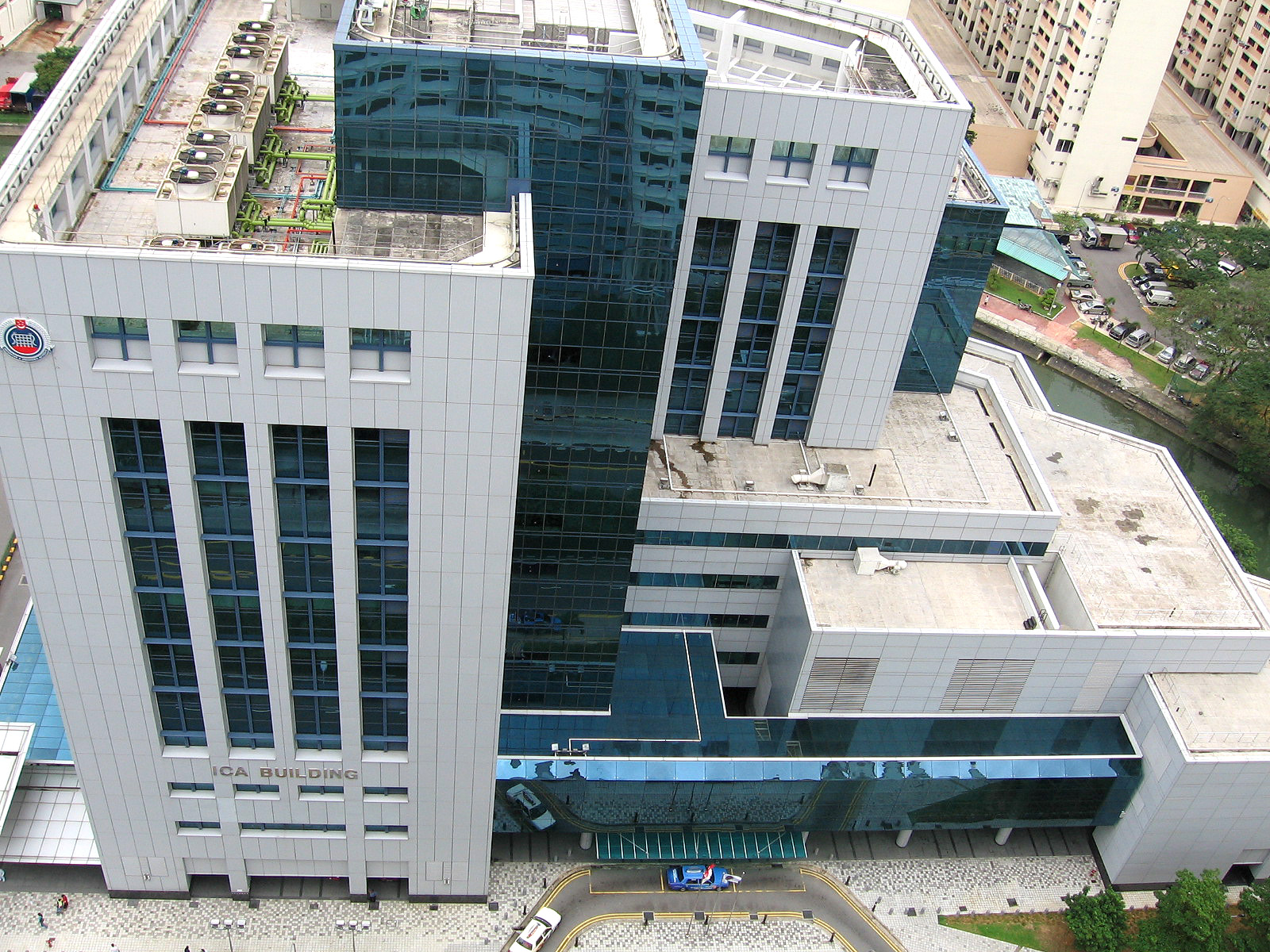
The ICA Building, the present headquarters of the Immigration and Checkpoints Authority. In a 1988 case involving the determination by the Minister for Home Affairs that a foreign national was an undesirable immigrant, the High Court of Singapore appeared to apply a light-touch standard.

In the Singapore context, there appears to be some implicit suggestion that the light touch test applies to certain cases. The 1988 case of Re Siah Mooi Guat concerning Singapore's immigration policy is illustrative. The applicant was an immigrant denied entry under section 8(3)(k) of the Immigration Act, as the Minister for Home Affairs considered her an "undesirable immigrant" based on certain confidential information that had been supplied to the Ministry. The issue was whether there was a basis upon which the Minister could have properly rejected the applicant's appeal, otherwise it might amount to Wednesbury unreasonableness. The GCHQ test of irrationality was cited but it seems that a higher level of scrutiny was exercised.

The court declined to require the Minister to disclose the information he had relied on, holding that "any information received by the Minister about an alien from any government through official or diplomatic channels, would be information which would not be in the public interest to disclose" and that it was for the Minister and not the court to decide whether disclosure was in the public interest. Ultimately, the Minister "had given the applicant's case his personal consideration, and there was no evidence to show that he had acted unfairly". Thus, similar to Cheblak, as long as the Minister had given consideration to the applicant's appeal, the court was reluctant to question the decision as immigration matters are best left to the Government.

In Re Wong Sin Yee (2007), the applicant had been detained without trial under the Criminal Law (Temporary Provisions) Act for involvement in criminal activities on the ground that the detention was in the interests of public safety, peace and good order. The High Court concluded that the judicial process was unsuitable for reaching decisions on questions of public safety, peace and good order, and that therefore it was "in no position to hold that it has been established that the Minister's exercise of discretion was irrational in the Wednesbury sense". Therefore, for sensitive issues pertaining to certain government policies in Singapore, it can be inferred that a high threshold is required to find a decision unreasonable in the Wednesbury sense. Where a non-justiciable issue is involved, even where it curtails fundamental liberties, courts will defer to the executive assessment of what the public order or interest demands.

== Relationship with proportionality ==
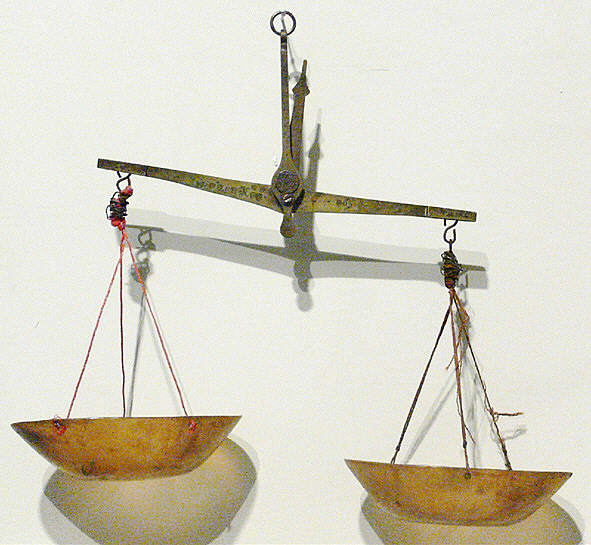
A 19th-century balance scale in the Museum of Folk Culture in Waldenbuch, Baden-Württemberg, Germany. It has been suggested in the UK context that a doctrine of proportionality should be applied in place of or merged into Wednesbury unreasonableness. Singapore cases have thus far declined to take such an approach.

In the UK, where human rights protected by the ECHR are prima facie infringed, the courts apply a doctrine of proportionality in place of the Wednesbury unreasonableness test. Additionally, proportionality is applied in respect of European Union law. Given these developments, the role of Wednesbury in ordinary administrative law cases has been questioned. It has been suggested that proportionality should supplant unreasonableness as a ground of review. The former has occasionally been regarded as superior to Wednesbury unreasonableness since its "emphasis on balance and justification is taken to offer 'a more structured methodology'".

Alternatively, it has been suggested that proportionality should merge with Wednesbury unreasonableness. It is said to share much in common with the reasonableness doctrine, as "proportionality in the sense of achieving a 'fair balance' has always been an aspect of unreasonableness". As Lord Slynn of Hadley stated in R (Alconbury Developments Ltd) v Secretary of State for the Environment, Transport and the Regions (2001), "trying to keep the Wednesbury principle and proportionality in separate compartments seems ... to be unnecessary and confusing". This may cause the "coherence and comprehensibility" of judicial review to suffer.

In any event, as Lord Justice of Appeal John Dyson observed in R (Association of British Civilian Internees: Far East Region) v Secretary of State for Defence (2003), "the Wednesbury test is moving closer to proportionality and in some cases it is not possible to see any daylight between the two tests ... [T]he result that follows will often be the same whether the test that is applied is proportionality or Wednesbury unreasonableness". However, English courts have been cautious about applying proportionality as it is "often understood to bring courts much closer to reviewing the merits of a decision" than is permitted by the Wednesbury test.

In Singapore's context, Chief Justice Wee Chong Jin observed in the Court of Appeal case of Chng Suan Tze that proportionality should be subsumed under irrationality rather than exist as an independent ground of review, such that if a decision "on the evidence is so disproportionate as to breach this principle, then ... such a decision could be said to be irrational in that no reasonable authority could have come to such a decision". This view was subsequently adopted in Dow Jones Publishing Co. (Asia) Inc. v. Attorney-General (1989).

In the High Court case of Chee Siok Chin, Justice V.K. Rajah, though speaking in the context of freedom of speech and freedom of assembly, noted that proportionality is a European jurisprudential concept imported into English law due to UK's treaty obligations, and it has "never been part of the common law in relation to the judicial review of the exercise of a legislative and/or an administrative power or discretion. Nor has it ever been part of Singapore law." The reason for the judicial reticence in recognising proportionality as a separate ground of review is due to the fact that the application of "any higher test than the Wednesbury test would necessarily involve the court in a decision on the merits", as observed by the court in Chan Hiang Leng Colin v. Minister for Information and the Arts (1996).

== See also ==
- "Patently unreasonable", an analogous doctrine in Canadian administrative law
