= Harlow Hill =

Harlow Hill may refer to:

- Harlow Hill, Harrogate, an area of Harrogate, North Yorkshire, England
- Harlow Hill, Northumberland, a village in England

== See also ==
- Harlow (disambiguation)
- Harrow Hill (disambiguation)
