= Harlow (disambiguation) =

Harlow is a town in Essex, England.

Harlow may also mean:

== People ==
- Bob Harlow (1899–1954), American golf administrator
- Bryce Harlow (1916–1987), American congressional staff member, army officer, and businessman
- Carol Harlow, British barrister and academic
- Dick Harlow (1889–1962), American football coach
- Don Harlow (1942–2008), American Esperantist
- Donald L. Harlow (1942–1997), Chief Master Sergeant of the United States Air Force
- George H. Harlow (1830–1900), American politician
- George Henry Harlow (1787–1819), English artist
- Greg Harlow (born 1968), English bowls player
- Harry Harlow (1905–1981), American psychologist
- Jack Harlow (born 1998), American rapper
- James Hayward Harlow, American engineer
- Jean Harlow (1911–1937), American actress
- Joel Harlow (born 1968), American make-up artist
- John Martyn Harlow (1819–1907), American physician to brain-injury survivor Phineas Gage
- Jules Harlow (1931–2024), American rabbi
- Larry Harlow (salsa) (1939–2021), American salsa music performer and composer
- Pat Harlow (born 1969), American football player
- Poppy Harlow (born 1982), American journalist
- Rachel Harlow (born 1948), American actress and socialite
- Sean Harlow (born 1995), American football player
- Shalom Harlow (born 1973), Canadian model and actress

== Fictional characters ==
- Bobbi Harlow, a school teacher in the comic strip Bloom County
- Clarissa Harlowe, heroine of Samuel Richardson's novel Clarissa

== Places ==
- Harlow or Harlow Hill, Harrogate, an area of Harrogate, North Yorkshire, England
- Harlow (UK Parliament constituency)
- Harlow, North Dakota, United States, an unincorporated community

== Films ==
- Harlow (Paramount film), a 1965 Paramount Pictures biographical film about actress Jean Harlow, starring Carroll Baker
- Harlow (Magna film), a 1965 Magna fictionalized biographical film about the actress, starring Carol Lynley

== Other ==
- Harlow (given name)
- Harlow (typeface)
- Harlow Aircraft Company
- House of Harlow, an American jewelry brand

== See also ==
- Haarlow
- Harrow (disambiguation)
