= Robert Harlow =

Robert Harlow may refer to:

- Bob Harlow, American golfer
- Robert Harlow (writer), Canadian writer
