= Administrative law in Singapore =

Law of Singapore's government agencies

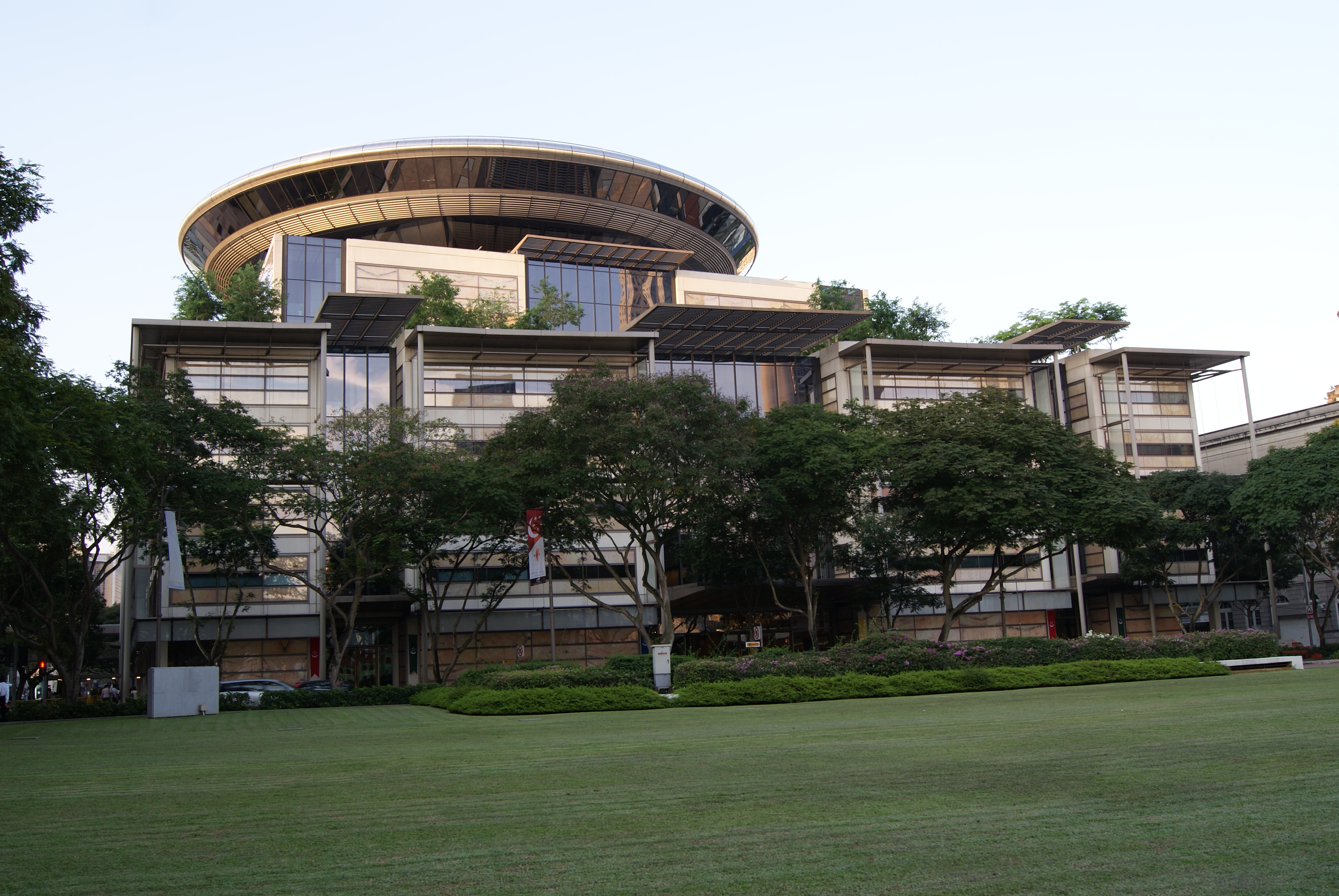
The Supreme Court of Singapore. The High Court, which is housed in this building, conducts judicial review of administrative action in Singapore by exercising its supervisory jurisdiction.

Administrative law in Singapore is a branch of public law that is concerned with the control of governmental powers as exercised through its various administrative agencies. Administrative law requires administrators – ministers, civil servants and public authorities – to act fairly, reasonably and in accordance with the law. Singapore administrative law is largely based on English administrative law, which the nation inherited at independence in 1965.

Claims for judicial review of administrative action may generally be brought under three well-established broad headings: illegality, irrationality, and procedural impropriety.

Illegality is divided into two categories: those that, if proved, mean that the public authority was not empowered to take action or make the decision it did; and those that relate to whether the authority exercised its discretion properly. Grounds within the first category are simple ultra vires and errors as to precedent facts (also known as jurisdictional errors of fact); while errors of law on the face of the record, making decisions on the basis of insufficient evidence or errors of material facts, taking into account irrelevant considerations or failing to take into account relevant ones, making decisions for improper purposes, fettering of discretion, and failing to fulfil substantive legitimate expectations are grounds within the second category.

Irrationality has been equated with Wednesbury unreasonableness, which is named after the UK case Associated Provincial Picture Houses v. Wednesbury Corporation (1947). According to Council of Civil Service Unions v. Minister for the Civil Service (1983), a public authority's decision may be quashed if it is "so outrageous in its defiance of logic or of accepted moral standards that no sensible person who had applied his mind to the question to be decided could have arrived at it".

A public authority commits a procedural impropriety when it fails to comply with procedures that are set out in the legislation that empowers it to act, or to observe basic rules of natural justice or otherwise to act in a procedurally fair manner towards a person who will be affected by its decision. The twin elements of natural justice are the rule against bias (nemo iudex in causa sua – "no man a judge in his own cause"), and the requirement of a fair hearing (audi alteram partem – "hear the other side").

== Introduction ==
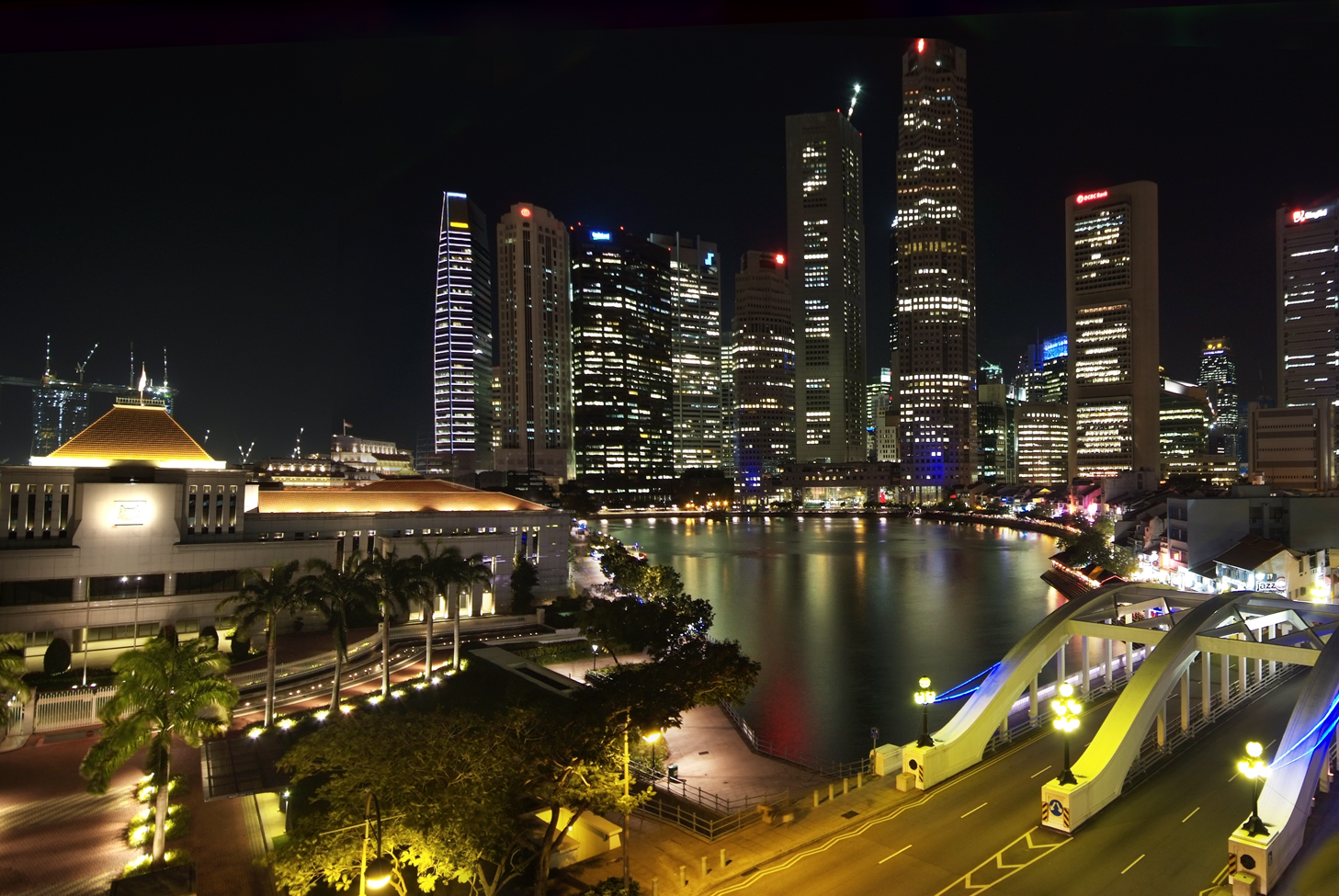
Parliament House (left) at night, photographed in December 2009. Judicial review of administrative action is important in Singapore because the executive dominates Parliament's legislative agenda.

Administrative law in Singapore is a branch of public law that is concerned with the control of governmental powers as exercised through its various administrative agencies. It enjoins administrators – ministers, civil servants or public authorities – to act fairly, reasonably and in accordance with the law.

Administrative law arose as a response to the advent of the administrative state. It is a 20th-century product of English administrative law, which Singapore inherited at independence. Like the English system, Singapore does not have a separate system of specialist administrative courts as is the case in most civil law jurisdictions. Singapore's courts are generally conservative in their approach towards administrative law, drawing heavily from English case law in some respects but not engaging in innovative elaboration of the existing heads of judicial review.

In the light of modernisation and the resulting necessity for a more interventionist state, administrative law has an increasingly important role to play in Singapore to ensure that the vulnerable individual has protection and practical remedies against abuse of power by the state. This is particularly so in Singapore's hegemonic, Westminster-based form of parliamentary government where the executive dominates the legislative agenda, because the alternate means of political control – holding the executive accountable to the popularly elected legislature – is almost negligible.

The judiciary thus exists as an independent check on executive power and it fulfils this function through judicial review of administrative action. The High Court's review jurisdiction is to be contrasted with its appellate jurisdiction: the latter is derived from the statutory framework, while judicial review is a power inherent as part of the court's supervisory jurisdiction. Both are designed to address different types of wrongs that an administrative decision-maker may commit.

Judicial review is available as a means of challenging the legality of decisions of all governmental authorities, though it is regarded as a procedure of last resort that should be used only where the individual has no alternative remedy such as a right of appeal. If a right of appeal exists, it is more favourable for a person to take advantage of it as the appellate court may substitute its decision for that of the original authority and grant a remedy. An appeal may also involve a reconsideration of the merits of the case and not merely its legality, although this depends on the wording of the statute in question. On the other hand, when exercising judicial review, the High Court is almost always limited to examining whether public authorities have acted lawfully, and do not evaluate the substantive merits of decisions taken.

=== Approaches to administrative law ===
Current legal thought and practice on administrative law can be seen to crystallise around two contrasting models labelled the "red-light" and "green-light" perspectives by Carol Harlow and Richard Rawlings in their 1984 book Law and Administration.

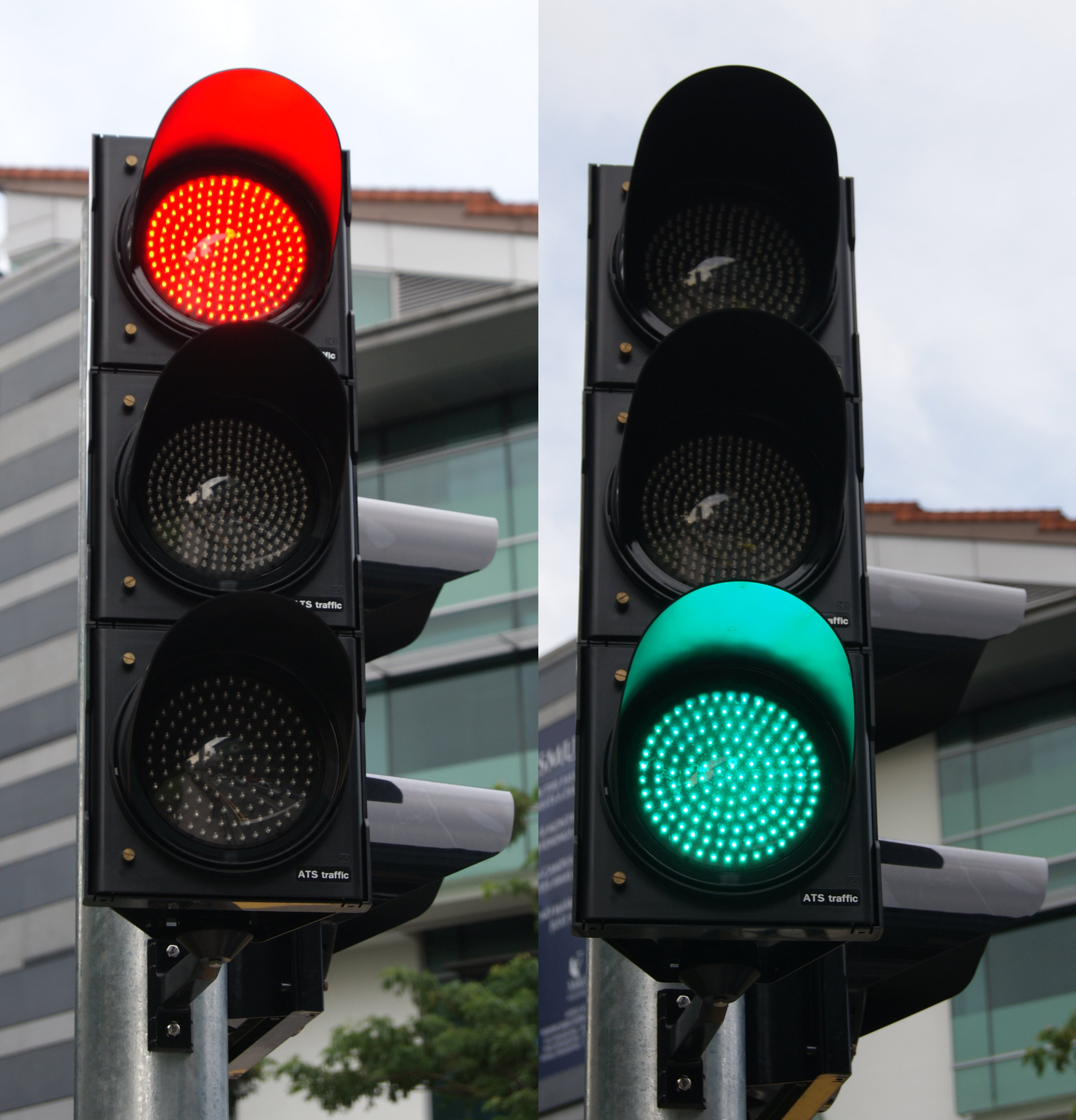
Traffic signals along Stamford Road, Singapore. In Singapore, the courts are said to emphasise a largely green-light approach towards administrative law

A red-light perspective of administrative law embodies deep-rooted suspicion of governmental power and a desire to minimise the encroachment of the state on the rights of individuals. This envisions the courts being locked in an adversarial or combative relationship with the Executive and functioning as a check on administrative power. Where a green-light perspective is concerned, the focus is not so much on actively resisting administrative bodies as a form of negative control (as in the red-light perspective), but instead raising areas where public bodies may improve their various administrative procedures.

This approach is derived from the utilitarian tradition, and the priority in achieving the greatest good for the greatest number is to encourage the contribution of the state through means of egalitarian and ameliorative social reform so as to deliver communitarian goals. Thus, the red-light perspective is more conservative and control-oriented, while the green-light perspective is more liberal or socialist in orientation and facilitative in nature.

Given the Singapore government's focus on efficiency, the country has been said to emphasise a largely green-light approach towards administrative law. Public administration is not seen as a necessary evil but a positive attribute, and the objective of administrative law is not primarily to stop bad administrative practices but to encourage good ones. In this approach, recourse to the judiciary is not the first line of defence against administrative abuses of powers. Instead, it is perceived that control can and should come internally from Parliament and the executive itself in upholding high standards of public administration and policy. In other words, instead of redressing bad government through the courts, good government should be sought through the political process and public avenues. Courts play a supporting role by articulating clear rules and principles by which the Singapore government may abide and conform to the rule of law.

=== Distinction between errors of fact and errors of law ===
In general, judicial review of administrative action is limited to cases involving errors of law and not errors of fact. The courts are primarily concerned with the legality of decisions, and not with their merits. The first reason for this is based on the doctrine of separation of powers, the courts are in no position to decide on a fact when the power to do so has been assigned to another body. This was articulated in Puhlhofer v. Hillingdon London Borough Council (1986), where Lord Brightman stated that "it is the duty of the court to leave the decision of that fact to the public body to whom Parliament has entrusted the decision-making power save in a case where it is obvious that the public body, consciously or unconsciously, are acting perversely".

The second reason is that the courts may not have the necessary expertise to assess the factual situation. Hence, the courts consider it best to leave any interpretation of facts up to those assigned by Parliament to do so. However, the court reviews an error of fact when there is an error as to a jurisdictional or precedent fact, the public body has taken into account irrelevant considerations, or a decision has been based on no evidence or an error of material fact.

=== Heads of judicial review ===
In the seminal United Kingdom case of Council of Civil Service Unions v. Minister for the Civil Service ("the GCHQ case", 1983), the House of Lords identified three well-established broad headings under which a claim for judicial review of administrative action may be made:

- illegality,
- irrationality, and
- procedural impropriety.

These heads of review do not form a conclusive list. Lord Diplock stated: "That is not to say that further development on a case by case basis may not in course of time add further grounds", and alluded to the possibility that in future the principle of proportionality, as recognised in the administrative law of several European Economic Community countries, might be adopted. The Singapore Court of Appeal affirmed the GCHQ case in Chng Suan Tze v. Minister for Home Affairs (1988), and Singapore courts have largely been consistent in following this framework.

== Illegality ==
The grounds of judicial review that may be regarded as forms of illegality can be divided into two categories: those that, if proved, mean that the public authority was not empowered to take action or make the decision it did; and those that relate to whether the authority exercised its discretion properly.

=== Grounds affecting the public authority's power ===
==== Simple ultra vires ====
The doctrine of simple ultra vires can be explained in this way: a public authority cannot act beyond the powers conferred upon it by the law, usually set out in statutes. In deciding the scope of powers conferred upon the public authority by such a statute, the "reasonably incidental" rule comes into play when interpreting its meaning. The courts often do not take a strict reading of the statute, but instead interpret its scope to permit the authority to carry out tasks reasonably incidental to the tasks expressly authorised by the statute.

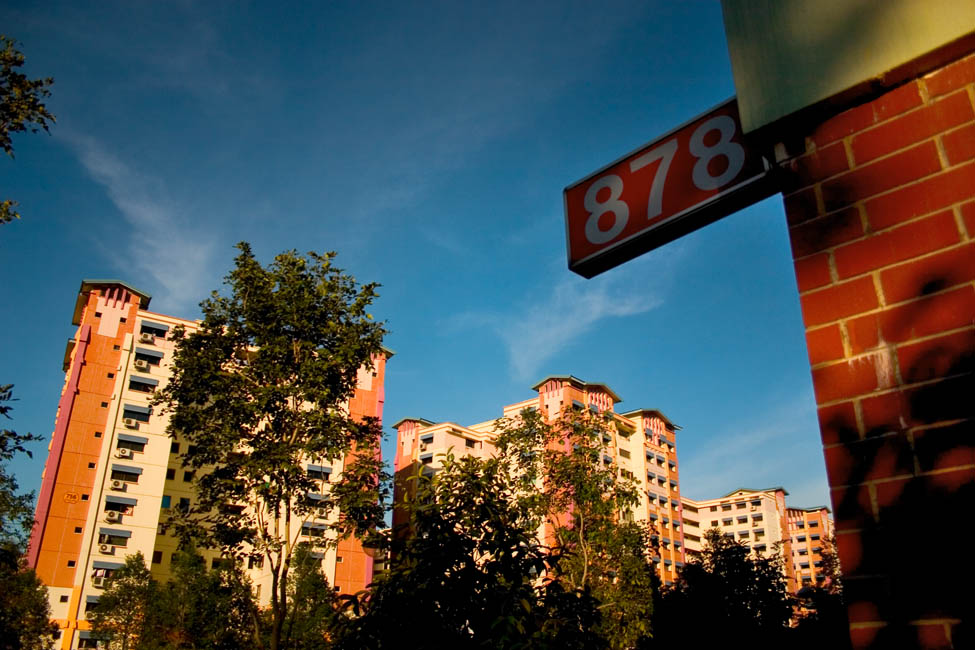
Public housing built by the Housing and Development Board (HDB) in Woodlands. In a 1984 case, the High Court held that the HDB had acted unlawfully by compulsorily acquiring a flat when it had no power to do so.

A decision-maker acts in an ultra vires manner when it did not have the power that it purported to have, and therefore there was no basis in law for the impugned action. In Attorney General v. Fulham Corporation (1921), the court held that the corporation was only empowered by statute to provide washing facilities for the residents to wash their clothes adequately. Hence, a laundry service implemented by the corporation was ultra vires.

The doctrine was implicitly applied in Singapore in Wong Yip Pui v. Housing and Development Board (1984). In this case, the Housing and Development Board (HDB), which was the landlord of a flat occupied by the plaintiff, purported to compulsorily acquire the flat on the ground that the plaintiff had breached section 48A of the Housing and Development Act. The provision entitled the HDB to seize a flat if one of its authorised occupiers had acquired an interest in any other real property, and the HDB alleged that one of the plaintiff's sons had done so.

The High Court found that the plaintiff's son was not an authorised occupier of the flat, as the term was defined in section 2(1) of the Act as "a person who is named in an application made to the Board as the person who intends to reside in the flat, house or other living accommodation sold or to be sold by the Board under Part IV or any person who is authorised in writing by the Board to reside therein". However, the plaintiff had not applied to buy the flat as he had, in fact, been invited by the HDB to buy it. Neither had the Board given any written authorisation for the plaintiff's son to reside in the flat. Thus, the Court granted the plaintiff an order that the HDB's action in acquiring the flat was illegal, and that the flat should be revested in him.

==== Error as to a precedent fact ====
An error as to a jurisdictional fact or precedent fact is committed when a decision-maker makes a decision in the absence of a fact that must exist objectively before the decision-maker is empowered by the legislation to decide. Here, the courts are not concerned with the evaluation of facts, but whether the facts exist for the decision maker to exercise his power.

White & Collins v. Minister of Health (1939) is a leading English authority on errors as to precedent facts. In that case, the statutory provision in question was section 75 of the Housing Act 1936, which stated that powers of compulsory acquisition were not to be exercised by a local authority over land forming "part of any park, garden, or pleasure ground ...". Hence, an order for acquisition could be made only if it was established that the land in question did not fall within the categories mentioned in section 75. The Court of Appeal of England and Wales eventually held that the land in question was part of a park, and since the local authority had committed an error as to a precedent fact, its acquisition order was quashed.

In Zamir v. Secretary of State for the Home Department (1980), the House of Lords held that whether a case is in the "precedent fact" category depends on the "nature and process of decision" conferred on the public authority by the legislation. If there is "room for appreciation, even for discretion" because, for example, the authority is required to consider numerous statutory rules and non-statutory guidelines, as well as evidence of doubtful accuracy or veracity, then the decision in question will be regarded as unsuitable for review by the court. In such cases, the court is limited to assessing whether there was evidence on which the authority, acting reasonably, could have reached a decision.

Subsequently, the House of Lords clarified the Zamir principle in Khera v. Secretary of State for the Home Department; Khawaja v. Secretary of State for the Home Department ("Khawaja", 1983). It expressed the view that where the exercise of a power by a public authority infringes a person's liberty, the court will generally regard the matter as falling within the "precedent fact" category even though the court might encounter difficulties in determining whether the authority has committed an error concerning such a fact. "If Parliament intends to exclude effective judicial review of the exercise of a power in restraint of liberty, it must make its meaning crystal clear."

This is likewise the law in Singapore. In Chng Suan Tze, the Court of Appeal held that:

... the function of the court in judicial review depends on whether a jurisdictional or precedent fact is involved. ... [W]here ... a jurisdictional fact issue arises the scope of review extends to deciding whether the evidence justifies the decision. It is also clear from the judgments in Khawaja ... that whether a particular discretionary power is subject to any jurisdictional or precedent fact depends on the construction of the legislation which creates that power. A discretionary power may be required to be exercised based on objective facts but Parliament may decide to entrust all relevant decisions of these facts as well as the application to the facts of the relevant rules and any necessary exercise of discretion to the decision maker, in which case the scope of review would be limited to Wednesbury principles. So long as Parliament makes its intention clear, the scope of review would be so limited, even where the liberty of the subject is concerned.

On the facts, the Court was of the view that the discretion accorded to the President and the Minister for Home Affairs under section 8 of the Internal Security Act to detain without trial a person believed to be a risk to national security, and accorded to the Minister under section 10 to suspend a detention order, did not fall within the "precedent fact" category. The relevant decisions had been plainly and unequivocally been entrusted by the Act to the President and the Minister, and in any case the Court did not "think it could have been intended by Parliament that whether or not on the evidence the detainee is likely to act or to continue acting in a manner prejudicial to the security of Singapore, should fall to be objectively determined, as a fact, by a court of law. It hardly needs any emphasis that the judicial process is unsuitable for reaching decisions on national security." Thus, the scope of judicial review was limited to the ordinary judicial review principles of illegality, irrationality and procedural impropriety referred to in the GCHQ case.

Re Fong Thin Choo (1991), involved regulation 12(6) of the Customs Regulations 1979, which stated that the owner of goods or his agent could be required by a customs officer to produce evidence that the goods had been exported or re-exported, and if the goods were not accounted for to the customs officer's satisfaction or were found to have been illegally re-landed in Singapore, the owner was liable to pay customs duty on them. The High Court held that the goods not having been exported was a precedent fact to the customs officer's power to require the owner to pay customs duty. Therefore, the Court had to decide whether the customs officer's decision was justified by the evidence, and not merely whether there was some evidence on which he could reasonably have reached his decision. However, the Court did not pursue the point since the applicant had not argued the case on this basis.

=== Grounds concerning whether the public authority properly exercised its discretion ===
==== Introduction: jurisdictional and non-jurisdictional errors of law ====
Traditionally, a distinction was drawn between jurisdictional errors of law and non-jurisdictional errors of law. A jurisdictional error of law was committed when a public authority made a decision or took some action even though it lacked jurisdiction to do so, for example, if the process was tainted by simple ultra vires. In this event, the High Court could judicially review the matter. On the other hand, a non-jurisdictional error of law occurred when an authority was properly empowered to make a decision or take action, but it was alleged that the authority had exercised its discretion in breach of some administrative law principle. In such cases, the Court was not allowed to intervene by exercising judicial review, save in certain circumstances such as a breach of natural justice. This distinction applied both to the exercise of power by public authorities and to courts and tribunals.

However, in English law, the decision in Anisminic Ltd. v. Foreign Compensation Commission (1968) is seen as having done away with the distinction, even though that was not the intention of the House of Lords. In R. v. Lord President of the Privy Council, ex parte Page (1992), it was held that since Parliament only confers power on a public authority on the basis that it is to be exercised on the correct legal basis, any misdirection in law will render the decision ultra vires. Thus, in general, all errors of law are now considered as jurisdictional and ultra vires in a broad sense of the term, and the High Court can intervene to correct them.

It is still not clear whether the legal position in Singapore on this issue is the same as that in the United Kingdom. In Stansfield Business International Pte. Ltd. v. Minister for Manpower (1999), the High Court cited the following passage from the judgment of the Privy Council on appeal from Malaysia in South East Asia Fire Bricks Sdn. Bhd. v. Non-Metallic Mineral Products Manufacturing Employees Union (1980):

[W]hen words in a statute oust the power of the High Court to review decisions of an inferior tribunal by certiorari, they must be construed strictly ... they will not have the effect of ousting that power if the inferior tribunal has acted without jurisdiction or "if it has done or failed to do something in the course of the inquiry which is of such a nature that its decision is a nullity": per Lord Reid at p. 171 [of Anisminic]. But if the inferior tribunal has merely made an error of law which does not affect its jurisdiction, and if its decision is not a nullity for some reason such as breach of the rules of natural justice, then the ouster will be effective.

The passage suggests that the Court continued to draw a distinction between jurisdictional and non-jurisdictional errors of law. However, since the decision was based on a breach of natural justice, the Court's remarks were, strictly speaking, obiter dicta. The rest of this article assumes that, at least where ouster clauses are not involved, Singapore law and UK law are the same – that is, the High Court may exercise judicial review whether a public authority has committed an error of law that would traditionally have been regarded as jurisdictional or non-jurisdictional.

==== Error of law on the face of the record ====
Even before Anisminic, one ground on which the courts could quash non-jurisdictional errors of law was where they were errors on the face of the record. An application for judicial review could be taken if a mistake of law was revealed on a perusal of the record of the proceedings. According to Re Application by Yee Yut Ee (1978), this ground of review is still applicable in Singapore today. In the case, the applicant, who was a company director, challenged an order of the Industrial Arbitration Court ("IAC") which had made him personally liable for paying the retrenchment benefits of the company's employees.

The High Court quashed the order, holding that it was patently illegal as it was not authorised by law. Under well-established company law principles, directors are not liable for their companies' debts unless there is proof of fraud, breach of warranty of authority or other exceptional circumstances, and nothing in the Industrial Relations Act which established the IAC, changed this. Even though the Act contained an ouster clause, the clause did not prevent the High Court from intervening when the IAC had committed an error of law which had caused it to act without jurisdiction.

==== No evidence and error of material fact ====
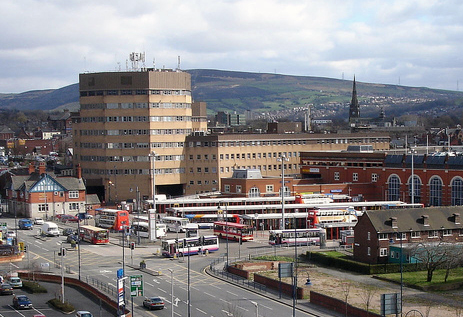
Tameside Council Offices in Ashton-under-Lyne, Greater Manchester, UK. In a 1976 decision originally brought by the Education Secretary against Tameside Metropolitan Borough Council over the latter's refusal to implement a system of comprehensive education, the House of Lords held that a public authority's decision may be judicially reviewed if it is unsupported by evidence or has been based on incorrect facts.

A court has the power to review a decision by a public authority if it was unsupported by evidence, or if the evidence was not reasonably capable of supporting the decision. This principle was accepted by the High Court in Fong Thin Choo, which approved the House of Lords decision Secretary of State for Education and Science v. Tameside Metropolitan Borough Council (1976). Tameside held that courts have power to inquire into whether facts relevant to decisions exist, and they have to be satisfied that there were sufficient factual bases for decisions to have been made. The High Court stated that the test of validity is whether the decision-maker "could reasonably have come to his decision on the evidence before him".

In addition, UK and Singapore cases indicate that decisions made by public authorities on the basis of errors of material facts are subject to judicial review. An error of material fact occurs when there is a "misunderstanding or ignorance of an established and relevant fact", or where the decision-maker acts "upon an incorrect basis of fact". In E v Secretary of State for the Home Department (2004), the English Court of Appeal went on to hold that the courts can intervene where such a mistake of fact causes unfairness to an individual. The relevant conditions are these:

First, there must have been a mistake as to an existing fact, including a mistake as to the availability of evidence on a particular matter. Secondly, the fact or evidence must have been "established", in the sense that it was uncontentious and objectively verifiable. Thirdly, the appellant (or his advisers) must not have been responsible for the mistake. Fourthly, the mistake must have played a material (not necessarily decisive) part in the tribunal's reasoning.

As this case has not yet been considered by the Singapore courts, it is uncertain whether the rules set out above are part of Singapore law. However, certain criticisms have been made against this legal test with regard to the scope of judicial intervention. Peter Leyland and Gordon Anthony have commented that "fairness" is subject to many different interpretations and thus may be "used to justify intervention in an ever more broad range of cases", which might lead to courts having too much discretion in reviewing cases.

==== Relevant and irrelevant considerations ====
Courts are willing to review cases where it is shown that the decision-maker failed to take into account all relevant considerations, or failed to disregard irrelevant considerations. Such considerations are usually identified expressly or impliedly in the statute that underpins the decision. In R. v. Somerset County Council, ex parte Fewings (1995), Lord Justice Simon Brown identified three types of considerations:

First, those clearly (whether expressly or impliedly) identified by the statute as considerations to which regard must be had. Second, those clearly identified by the statute as considerations to which regard must not be had. Third, those to which the decision-maker may have regard if in his judgment and discretion he thinks it right to do so.

As regards the first type, which may be termed mandatory relevant considerations, it has been held that courts may intervene in cases where there are matters "so obviously material to a decision on a particular project that anything short of direct consideration of them by the ministers ... would not be in accordance with the intention of the Act". The judge in ex parte Fewings also elaborated on the third type, which may be called discretionary relevant considerations, stating that a decision-maker has limited discretion to decide what considerations to take into account in its reasoning process, but that these considerations cannot be Wednesbury unreasonable. Once a decision-maker has determined that a particular consideration is relevant to its decision, it is entitled to go on to accord little or no weight to that consideration. The question of whether something is a material consideration is a question of law the court is entitled to decide, while the question of the weight it should be given is a question of judgment which is entirely a matter for the decision-maker.

The Singapore High Court has quashed a decision when it found, among other things, that the decision-maker had not taken into account relevant considerations. In Tan Gek Neo Jessie v. Minister for Finance (1991), the applicant had registered a clothing business called "JC Penney Collections". Three years later, she was ordered by the Registrar of Businesses to alter her business name to one that did not mention "JC Penney" on the ground that the name was that of an American company, J.C. Penney Company Inc., which had registered two "Penneys" trademarks in Singapore.

The Registrar relied on section 11 of the Business Registration Act, which stated that the Registrar was entitled to cancel the registration of a business name that "so nearly resembles the name of any corporation or the name under which another person carries on business as to be calculated to mislead" if the business owner failed to change the name within six weeks from being requested to do so. The Court noted that the Registrar had placed much reliance on the trademarks registered by J.C. Penney, but had failed to consider the following facts: first, J.C. Penney had not used the trademarks on any goods in Singapore; secondly, the registration of the trademarks had expired and did not appear to have been renewed; and thirdly, the applicant herself had not used "JC Penney" or "Penneys" as a trademark on any items she sold. Thus, by ordering the applicant to change her business name, the Registrar had accorded to J.C. Penney more rights than it was entitled to under the law relating to trademark infringement and the tort of passing off.

The High Court also held that the Registrar, in reaching her decision, had relied on an allegation by J.C. Penney's lawyers that the applicant had been capitalising on JC Penney's reputation and deceiving the public that her business was a branch of or associated in some way with JC Penney. However, the Court held that the Registrar was wrong to have done so as it was an inference which had no probative value since it was not founded on any substratum of facts.

In R. (SB) v. Headteacher and Governors of Denbigh High School (2006), the House of Lords expressed the view that whether an individual possesses certain human rights is not a relevant consideration during a public authority's decision-making process. The quality of the decision-making process is not as significant as the practical outcome of the process and whether it infringes the rights of the individual.

A public authority's duties are generally imposed by legislation, which gives it discretion as to how to meet the objectives of the Act while working within a finite budget. The financial resources available to a public authority when making discretionary choices in respect of the performance of its duties may or may not be a relevant consideration depending on how the courts interpret the overall legislative scheme. In certain cases, a court might find that the need for services cannot be assessed without having some regard to the cost of providing them, while in others the court might decide that financial resources are an irrelevant factor.

==== Improper purpose ====
Where a statute grants a power for a particular purpose, it is unlawful for the decision-maker to exercise that power for another purpose or to frustrate the object of the statute by exercising the power. The purpose for which the power was conferred is a question of law to be determined by the court by construing the statute as a whole. The judge has to place himself in the position of the statute's draftsman and "ascertain what facts were within the draftsman's knowledge, and what statutory objectives he had both generally and as to the particular provision to be construed". After doing so, the judge will be in a position to read the statutory language in its "primary and most natural sense which it bears in its context". In general, the court may not refer to the statement of a minister set out in Hansard (reports of parliamentary debates) concerning the scope of a statutory power, unless the minister has given "a categorical assurance to Parliament that a power would not be used in a given situation, such that Parliament could be taken to have legislated on that basis," which is unlikely to happen.

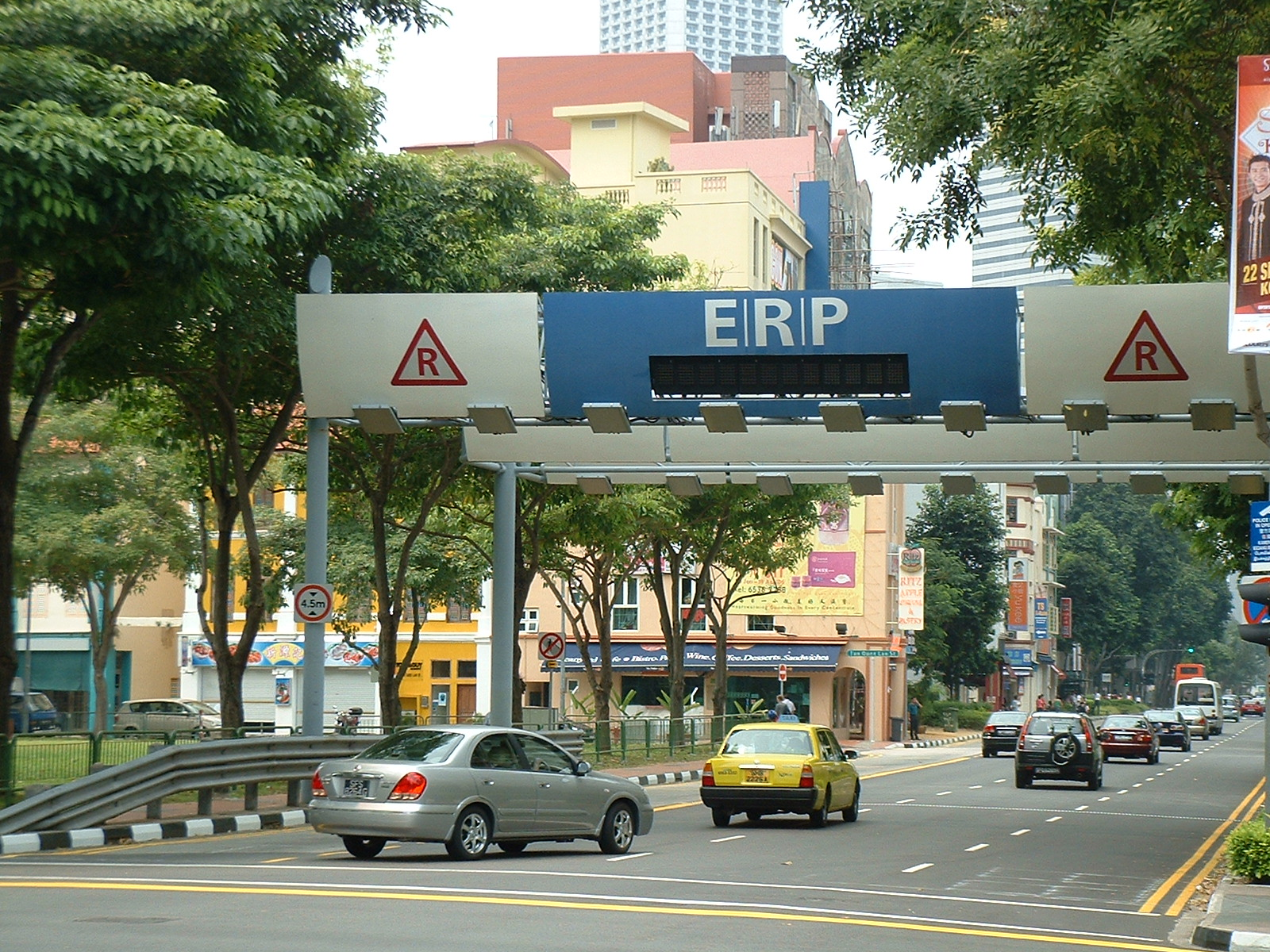
An Electronic Road Pricing (ERP) gantry. The ERP scheme replaced the Singapore Area Licensing Scheme, the legality of which was the subject of a 1977 case.

In Singapore, a broad approach has been taken towards the determination of whether a decision-maker has exercised its power for an improper purpose. In Public Prosecutor v. Pillay M.M. (1977), the respondent was charged for having driven his car into a restricted zone established under the Singapore Area Licensing Scheme without having paid the requisite fee for doing so, contrary to the Motor Vehicles (Restricted Zone and Area Licences) Rules 1975 which had been issued by the Minister for Communications pursuant to the Road Traffic Act.

The respondent argued that the Rules were invalid as the Act only empowered the Minister to make rules to regulate road traffic, and not to collect fees. The High Court held that the Minister had not exceeded the statutory power given to him as the main purpose of the rules he had imposed was consistent with the objective of the Act, that is, to regulate traffic on the roads. Collecting fees from drivers entering the restricted zone was merely incidental to this purpose. Hence, in Singapore it appears that a decision-maker does not act unlawfully if it exercises a statutory power for a purpose that is incidental to the legislative purpose.

In cases where the decision-maker is exercising power for multiple purposes, both proper and improper, the decision-maker will not have acted illegally so long as the dominant purpose for which the power has been exercised is a proper one. For the decision-maker's exercise of power to be successfully impugned, it has to be shown that the unlawful purpose was the primary object and not just something the decision-maker contemplated.

==== Fettering of discretion ====
===== Rigid application of policy =====
The decision of a public authority may be challenged if the authority has fettered the exercise of its discretion by adhering too rigidly to a policy it has designed to structure its discretion. It is legitimate for public authorities to formulate policies that are "legally relevant to the exercise of their powers, consistent with the purpose of the enabling legislation, and not arbitrary, capricious or unjust". However, authorities must remain free to depart from their policies depending on the case at hand. It is a general rule that "anyone who has to exercise a statutory discretion must not shut his ears to an application", and that an authority must always be willing to listen to anyone with something new to say.

The Singapore High Court stated in Lines International Holding (S) Pte. Ltd. v. Singapore Tourist Promotion Board (1997) that the adoption of a general policy by a body exercising an administrative discretion is perfectly valid provided the following conditions are satisfied:

- The policy must not be unreasonable in the special sense given to the term in Associated Provincial Picture Houses v. Wednesbury Corporation (1947), that is, the policy must not be so outrageous in its defiance of logic or accepted moral standards that no sensible person who applied his or her mind to the matter could have arrived at such a view.
- In considering unreasonableness in the Wednesbury sense, the court is not entitled to substitute its view of how the discretion should be exercised for what was actually done, nor is unreasonableness established if the court merely comes to the view that such a policy or guideline may not work effectively as another, since the court is not exercising an appellate function in respect of administrative decisions. The applicant has the burden of proving that the policy or guideline is illegal or ultra vires.
- The policy must be made known to the persons likely to be affected by it.
- The public body does not fetter its discretion and is prepared to hear out individual cases or to deal with exceptional cases.

The exercise of an unqualified discretion may be attacked if it was exercised in bad faith, or if it was so unreasonable as to show that there could not have been any real of genuine exercise of discretion. Hence, so long as the decision-maker genuinely considers all the evidence, is willing to consider exceptions, and applies guidelines in a flexible manner, the court will not find that the decision-maker has fettered its discretion.

===== Wrongful abdication, delegation or dictation =====
It is generally unlawful for a decision-maker to delegate its statutory power of decision to another person or body, unless this is expressly provided for in the statute empowering the decision-maker. In Singapore, the Interpretation Act states that "[w]here a written law confers a power or imposes a duty on the holder of an office as such, then, unless the contrary intention appears, the power may be exercised and the duty shall be performed ... by a person duly appointed to act for him". Furthermore, a minister empowered by written law to exercise any power or perform any duty is entitled, with the President's approval, to depute another person to exercise that power or perform that duty on his or her behalf.

However, the rule against non-delegation does not mean that civil servants or government officials are prevented from making decisions on behalf of ministers or government departments. As it is not possible for the government to make every individual decision, it has to rely on others for help. Hence, even when a statute authorises "the Minister" to act, Parliament will expect only that the power be exercised by an appropriate official. In what is known as the alter ego principle, the decision of such an official will be attributed to the minister. "The minister is responsible. It is he who must answer before Parliament for anything that his officials have done under his authority."

In Lines International, the High Court held that since the Port of Singapore Authority was the authority vested with control over berths for vessels, it could not abdicate its responsibility by taking orders from other statutory boards unless it was under a legal duty to do so. If, on the evidence, a court concludes that an authority has fettered its discretion by acting under dictation from other people or bodies, its decision will be invalid. The authority has to come to a decision based on its own discretion, taking into account other relevant facts or evidence.

==== Substantive legitimate expectation ====
Under UK law, a public authority may be prevented from going back on a lawful representation that an individual will receive or continue to receive a substantive benefit of some kind, even if he or she does not have a legal right to the benefit, because the representation gives rise to a legitimate expectation. That expectation may arise from a promise made by the authority, or from a consistent past practice. As the expectation must be a "reasonable" one, a person's own conduct may deprive him or her of any expectations he or she may have of legitimacy. The courts take three practical questions into consideration in determining whether to give effect to an applicant's legitimate interest:

- whether a legitimate expectation has arisen as a result of a public body's representation;
- whether it is unlawful for the public body to frustrate the legitimate expectation; and
- if so, what the appropriate remedy is.

As regards the first question, in Borissik v. Urban Redevelopment Authority (2009), the Singapore High Court adopted four conditions set out in De Smith's Judicial Review (6th ed., 2007) to determine whether a legitimate expectation has been created. The public body's representation must be clear, unambiguous and devoid of any relevant qualification; induced by the conduct of the decision-maker; made by a person with actual or ostensible authority; and applicable to the applicant, who belongs to the class of persons to whom the representation is reasonably expected to apply.

As regards the second question, in R. v. North and East Devon Health Authority, ex parte Coughlan (1999), the Court of Appeal of England and Wales identified three categories of legitimate expectations. Category (b) involves procedural legitimate expectations, which are discussed below. Categories (a) and (c) relate to substantive legitimate expectations. Category (a) cases are those that lie "... in what may inelegantly be called the macro-political field." The public authority "is only required to bear in mind its previous policy or other representation, giving it the weight it thinks right, but no more, before deciding whether to change course", and the court may only review the authority's decision on the ground of Wednesbury unreasonableness.

On the other hand, category (c) cases are usually those "where the expectation is confined to one person or a few people, giving the promise or representation the character of a contract". When assessing such a case, the court decides whether for a public authority to frustrate an expectation is so unfair that it amounts to an abuse of power. The court must weigh the requirements of fairness towards the individual against any overriding interests relied by the authorities to justify the change of policy. A slightly different approach has been adopted by Lord Justice John Laws. In R. v. Secretary of State for Education and Employment, ex parte Begbie (1999), he suggested that the Coughlan categories are not "hermetically sealed", and in Nadarajah v. Secretary of State for the Home Department (2005), he expanded on this by taking a proportionality approach:

[A] public body's promise or practice as to future conduct may only be denied ... in circumstances where to do so is the public body's legal duty, or is otherwise ... a proportionate response (of which the court is the judge, or the last judge) having regard to a legitimate aim pursued by the public body in the public interest.

Where the third question is concerned, where a person convinces the court that his or her substantive legitimate expectation has been frustrated, the usual remedy is for the court to order that the public authority fulfil the expectation. However, in R. (Bibi) v. Newham London Borough Council (2001) it was held that when the decision in question is "informed by social and political value judgments as to priorities of expenditure" it is more appropriate for the authority to make the decision, and the court may order that the authority should merely reconsider its decision, taking into account the person's substantive legitimate expectation.

The doctrine of substantive legitimate expectation has not yet been explicitly acknowledged as part of Singapore law. In Abdul Nasir bin Amer Hamsah v. Public Prosecutor (1997), the Singapore Court of Appeal had to decide whether life imprisonment in the Penal Code meant imprisonment for 20 years, which was the prevailing understanding, or whether it meant imprisonment for the remaining period of the convicted person's natural life. The Court concluded that the latter interpretation was correct, but overruled the former interpretation prospectively such that it only took effect from the date of the judgment and did not apply to the appellant. One of the reasons the Court relied on for doing so was the administrative law doctrine of legitimate expectation.

It recognised that "certain legitimate expectations could, in certain circumstances, be deserving of protection, even though they did not acquire the force of a legal right". Since for many years life imprisonment had been reckoned as 20 years' incarceration, this had given rise to a legitimate expectation according to which individuals had arranged their affairs. Thus, the Court ought to give effect to the expectation by prospectively overruling the prior interpretation. Nonetheless, the Court stated: "[W]e were not concerned with judicial review, nor were we deciding whether any claim of a legitimate expectation could estop the Prisons Department in future from applying the interpretation which we gave to life imprisonment. That was a separate matter which was not under consideration here."

In Borissik, the applicant and her husband were joint owners of a semi-detached house with a plot size of around 419 square metres (4,510 sq ft), which was attached to another semi-detached house with a plot size of around 244.5 square metres (2,632 sq ft). In 2002, the Urban Redevelopment Authority (URA) revised its guidelines for the redevelopment of semi-detached houses, now permitting a semi-detached house to be converted to a detached house if and only if both the semi-detached plot and its adjoining semi-detached plot each had a size of at least 400 square metres (4,300 sq ft). On the basis of this guideline, the URA rejected the application submitted by the applicant and her husband to demolish their semi-detached house and replace it with a detached house. Dissatisfied, the applicant obtained leave to apply for a mandatory order for approval to be granted. One of her arguments was that she had a legitimate expectation that her proposal would be approved on the basis of the old guidelines. In other words, she sought fulfilment of a substantive legitimate expectation.

In the end, the High Court decided that the URA had made no clear representation to her. She could neither show that any person with actual or ostensible authority had made any promise to her, nor that the URA's officers had acted in a way to lead her to have a legitimate expectation that her redevelopment plans would be approved. Commenting ex-curially, Chief Justice Chan Sek Keong cautioned against reading the case as an implicit acknowledgement that legitimate expectations can be substantively enforced. He noted that "there is good reason for judges in Singapore to tread carefully, stepping gingerly on each stone in crossing the river".

In UDL Marine (Singapore) Pte. Ltd. v. Jurong Town Corp. (2011), the High Court "entertain[ed] some doubt" as to whether the doctrine of substantive legitimate expectation is part of Singapore law, but did not discuss the matter further as neither the respondent nor the Attorney-General had made submissions on the issue.

== Irrationality or Wednesbury unreasonableness ==
In the GCHQ case, irrationality, the second broad head of judicial review, was equated with Wednesbury unreasonableness, named after the UK case Associated Provincial Picture Houses v. Wednesbury Corporation (1947). Lord Diplock said:

By "irrationality" I mean what can by now be succinctly referred to as "Wednesbury unreasonableness" ... . It applies to a decision which is so outrageous in its defiance of logic or of accepted moral standards that no sensible person who had applied his mind to the question to be decided could have arrived at it.

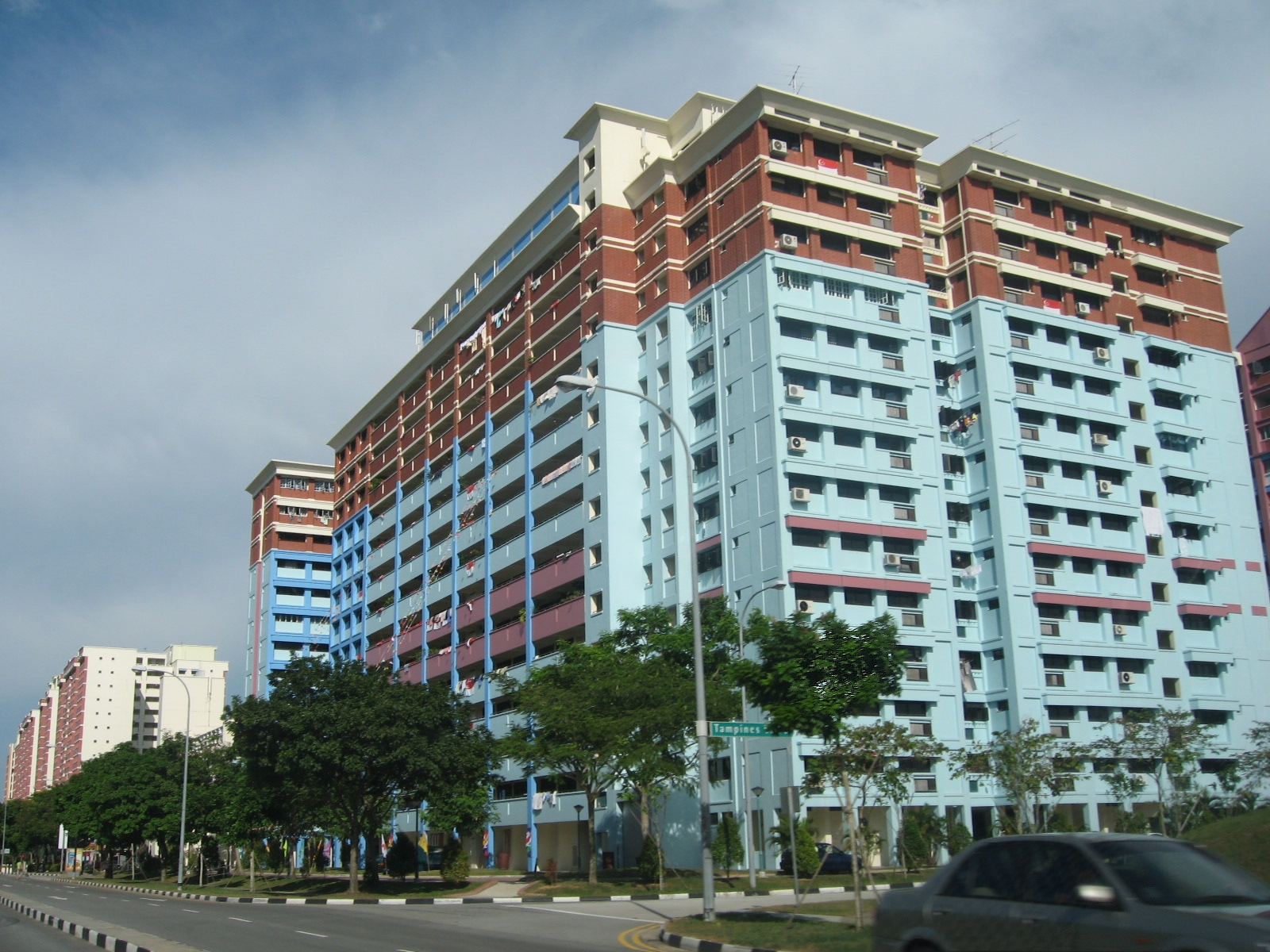
Public housing in Tampines. A privatised Housing and Urban Development Corporation (HUDC) condominium called Tampines Court elsewhere in this estate was the subject of a 2009 case. The High Court held that the Strata Titles Board had acted irrationally by scheduling a hearing date after the contractual deadline by which the Board's approval of the sale and purchase of the condominium had to be obtained.

The justification for the strict standard of this ground of judicial review is the doctrine of separation of powers. In R. v. Secretary of State for the Home Department, ex parte Brind (1991), Lord Ackner explained that where the court was not acting in pursuance of a statutory right of appeal but exercising its supervisory jurisdiction, it would be usurping the decision-maker's power if it substituted its own decision on the merits for that of the decision-maker.

It could quash a decision by a government minister "[i]f no reasonable minister properly directing himself would have reached the impugned decision", but for an aggrieved person "[t]o seek the court's intervention on the basis that the correct or objectively reasonable decision is other than the decision which the minister has made is to invite the court to adjudicate as if Parliament had provided a right of appeal against the decision – that is, to invite an abuse of power by the judiciary".

The decision of a Singapore public authority was found to be Wednesbury unreasonable in Mir Hassan bin Abdul Rahman v Attorney-General (2009). The case concerned a decision of the Strata Titles Board (STB) not to reschedule a hearing date for the approval of a condominium's sale and purchase agreement. The applicants, who were representatives of a sales committee representing the owners of units in a condominium, had agreed to sell the condominium to certain purchasers. Under the agreement between the parties, the applicants were required to obtain the STB's approval for the transaction by 25 July 2008.

However, the STB only scheduled a hearing on 7 August 2008. Unable to obtain the purchaser's approval to extend the deadline, the applicants applied for the hearing date to be brought forward, but the application was dismissed by the registrar of the STB. Upon an application for judicial review of this decision, the High Court held that "the STB's decision to schedule the resumed hearing on 7 August 2008, which is beyond its mandate and is an exercise in futility, was, in the circumstances of this case, unreasonable in the Wednesbury sense".

Wednesbury unreasonableness appears to be applied in the UK on a sliding scale with varying levels of scrutiny depending on the nature of the case. An applicant must prove a higher level of unreasonableness for matters involving political judgment such as national security and financial administration, than for matters in which the individual's liberty is at stake. The differing levels of intensity of review are set out in the table below:

Intensity of review	Test
Non-justiciable	In some cases, the public authority's discretion has been held not to be reviewable on Wednesbury grounds, such as in R. (on the application of Campaign for Nuclear Disarmament) v. Prime Minister (2002).
"Light touch" review	In R. v. Ministry of Defence, ex parte Smith (1995), Sir Thomas Bingham, the Master of the Rolls, held: "The greater the policy content of a decision, and the more remote the subject matter of a decision from ordinary judicial experience, the more hesitant the court must necessarily be in holding a decision to be irrational. That is good law and, like most good law, common sense. Where decisions of a policy-laden, esoteric or security-based nature are in issue, even greater caution than normal must be shown in applying the test, but the test itself is sufficiently flexible to cover all situations." One of the cases referred to in ex parte Smith was Nottinghamshire County Council v. Secretary of State for the Environment, Transport and the Regions (1985), in which the House of Lords held that the courts should not exercise judicial review on the ground of unreasonableness in a matter concerning public financial administration unless the action taken was "so absurd that [the decision-maker] must have taken leave of his senses".
Basic Wednesbury unreasonableness	In addition to the articulation of the test in the GCHQ case mentioned above, in Devon County Council v. George (1988) the House of Lords described a Wednesbury-unreasonable decision as one that elicits the exclamation "my goodness, that is certainly wrong".
"Anxious scrutiny" review	Also known as "enhanced level scrutiny" or "rigorous examination", in ex parte Smith it was held: "The court may not interfere with the exercise of an administrative decision on substantive grounds save where the court is satisfied ... that it is beyond the range of responses open to a reasonable decision-maker but in judging whether the decision-maker has exceeded this margin of appreciation the human rights context is important. The more substantial the interference with human rights, the more the court will require by way of justification before it is satisfied that the decision is reasonable in the sense outlined above."

In the Singapore context, there appears to be some implicit suggestion that the light touch test applies to certain cases. In Re Wong Sin Yee (2007), the applicant had been detained without trial under the Criminal Law (Temporary Provisions) Act for involvement in criminal activities on the ground that the detention was in the interests of public safety, peace and good order. The High Court concluded that the judicial process was unsuitable for reaching decisions made on such grounds, and that therefore it was "in no position to hold that it has been established that the Minister's exercise of discretion was irrational in the Wednesbury sense". On the other hand, the anxious scrutiny standard has not been applied thus far in Singapore.

== Procedural impropriety ==
In the GCHQ case, Lord Diplock described the third broad head of judicial review – procedural impropriety – as including both "a failure ... to observe procedural rules that are expressly laid down in the legislative instrument by which [a public authority's] jurisdiction is conferred" and a "failure to observe basic rules of natural justice or failure to act with procedural fairness towards the person who will be affected by the decision".

=== Failure to observe statutory procedure ===
A public authority commits a procedural impropriety when it fails to comply with procedures that are set out in the legislation that empowers it to act. Thus, in Yong Vui Kong v. Attorney-General (2011), the Court of Appeal held that a failure by the Cabinet to follow the procedure set out in Article 22P(2) of the Constitution when determining whether to advise the President to grant clemency to a person sentenced to death is subject to judicial review.

The legal consequences of non-compliance with procedural or formality requirements in a written law is wholly or partly dependent on whether the requirement in question is mandatory or directory. Courts may read a requirement as both mandatory and directory; that is, mandatory as to substantial compliance, and directory as to precise compliance. Old cases usually regarded an act done or decision reached in breach of a mandatory requirement as a nullity and void ab initio (that is, from the beginning). On the other hand, an act done in breach of a directory provision is merely voidable, and therefore effective until set aside. In deciding whether a statutory provision is mandatory or directory, the courts will look at its purpose and relationship with the scheme, subject matter and object of the statute in question, and must assess the importance attached to it by Parliament.

A provision will usually be declaratory if it relates to the performance of a statutory duty rather than to the exercise of a power on individual interests. If a procedural code established in a statute is intended to be exhaustive and strictly enforced, its provisions are mandatory. The determination will depend on the context and whether, for instance, a mistake is found to be trivial or whether individual rights are obviously prejudiced by the failure to observe the requirement.

=== Failure to act fairly or breach of natural justice ===
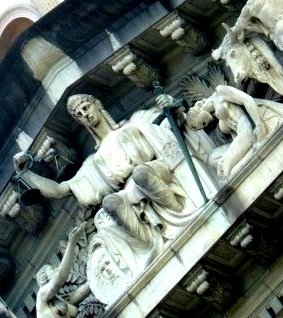
A depiction of Justice in Rodolfo Nolli's sculpture Allegory of Justice on the tympanum of the Old Supreme Court Building. The twin elements of natural justice are the rule against bias (nemo iudex in causa sua) and fair hearing (audi alteram partem).

==== Impartiality ====
One of the twin elements of natural justice is the rule against bias or nemo iudex in causa sua, which means that no one should be a judge in his or her own cause. The rule ensures that decision-makers will not be biased or prejudiced in a way that precludes a genuine and fair consideration of the arguments or evidence presented by the parties. Bias may be actual, imputed or apparent.

===== Actual bias =====
A decision-maker will be regarded as actually biased where it can be shown that he or she was either influenced by partiality or prejudice in reaching the decision, or actually prejudiced in favour of or against a party. Actual bias by a decision-maker must be proven on a balance of probabilities, and if this is achieved it conclusively vitiates the decision. However, applications and objections based on actual bias are very rare as proof of actual bias is often very difficult. The law does not permit a judge to be questioned about extraneous influences affecting his or her mind, as "the policy of the common law is to protect litigants who can discharge the lesser burden of showing a real danger of bias without requiring them to show that such bias actually exists".

In Chee Siok Chin v. Attorney-General (2006), counsel for the applicants alleged that the judge was guilty of actual bias and requested that she recuse herself. The judge rejected the application as she found the supporting grounds flimsy, and felt that a fair-minded and reasonable observer would hardly conclude that she would not be able to make an objective and impartial decision of the matters placed before her as another judge would.

===== Imputed bias =====
When the decision-maker has a pecuniary or personal interest in relation to the parties in the decision, he or she will be disqualified from making the decision on the basis that there is imputed bias. If the adjudicator has a pecuniary interest in the case, however small the interest is, it will be enough for the decision to be set aside. As for a personal interest, if it can be shown that, for example, an adjudicator has already indicated partisanship by expressing opinions antagonistic or favourable to the parties before him, or has made known his views about the merits of the very issue or issues of a similar nature in such a way as to suggest prejudgment, or because of his personal relationship with a party, the court is likely to impute bias.

===== Apparent bias =====
Courts will disqualify a decision by a decision-maker if it can be proven that there was apparent bias. In Jeyaretnam Joshua Benjamin v. Lee Kuan Yew (1992), the Court of Appeal held that the applicable test for apparent bias was whether "a reasonable and right-thinking person sitting in court and knowing the relevant facts would have any reasonable suspicion that a fair trial for the applicant was not possible".

However, in Tang Kin Hwa v. Traditional Chinese Medicine Practitioners Board (2005), Judicial Commissioner Andrew Phang expressed the view that there is no difference in substance between the "reasonable suspicion of bias" test and what has been termed the "real likelihood of bias" test. Subsequently, in Re Shankar Alan s/o Anant Kulkarni (2006), Sundaresh Menon J.C. disagreed with Phang J.C., commenting that there are important differences between the two tests. He felt that the real likelihood test is more stringent and requires the matter to be viewed from the court's perspective rather than the perspective of the reasonable person, which make the test less desirable than the reasonable suspicion test. Chan Sek Keong C.J. has expressed a preference for assessing apparent bias from the viewpoint of the ordinary person in the street, and has also suggested that if an allegation against a court or tribunal is made by a professional such as a lawyer, it may be more appropriate to judge the matter from the viewpoint of the professional class rather than a lay person.

==== Fair hearing ====
The other important element of natural justice is fair hearing (audi alteram partem, or "hear the other side"). The essence of a fair hearing is that the person whose conduct is sought to be impugned should be told clearly what case he or she is to meet. The case against him or her should not be left to conjecture.

Generally, the rule applies only to conduct leading directly to a final act or decision, and not to making a preliminary decision or investigation designed to obtain information for the purposes of a report or a recommendation on which a subsequent decision may be founded. However, there are also many situations where the rule will be presumed not to apply. For example, the rule does not apply where compliance with it is inconsistent with the need for taking urgent preventive or remedial action, the interests of national security, or the deportation of undesirable aliens; where disclosure of confidential information to an interested party is prejudicial to the public interest; where it is impracticable to give prior notice or an opportunity to be heard; where a hearing would serve no useful purpose; or in some cases where Parliament shows its intention to exclude its application by conferring on an authority wide discretionary power.

===== Right to be informed in advance of case to be met =====
The rules of natural justice require that persons liable to be directly affected by the outcome of any decision must be given prior notification of the action proposed to be taken, of the time and place of any hearing that is to be conducted, and of the charge or case they will be called upon to meet. There is also a necessary implication that notice must not only be given, but that it must be sufficient and accurate, to enable parties to understand the cases they have to meet and to prepare their answers and their own cases.

Furthermore, natural justice is concerned with procedural fairness prior to and during adjudication by courts or administrative tribunals. Therefore, when the cases speak of "notice", they refer to prior notice of the offence, the charges that will be preferred and the hearing at which a decision will be made. The requirement of notice does not mean that the accused or the person affected is also entitled to notice of the final decision of the court or tribunal if they choose to absent themselves from the proceedings and then omit to make any inquiries. Since the pronouncement of disqualification is made in open court, there is no further need to notify the accused of the order of the court.

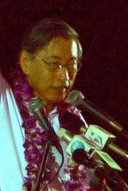
Opposition politician Chiam See Tong at an election rally in May 2006

In Chiam See Tong v. Singapore Democratic Party (1993), the plaintiff claimed he had been wrongfully expelled from the Singapore Democratic Party (SDP). Justice Warren Khoo held that the SDP's central executive committee ("CEC"), while conducting a disciplinary hearing concerning comments that the plaintiff had made to the press, had not given him a fair hearing because he had not been told with any precision the case he had to meet. Khoo J. was of the view that "the conduct of the disciplinary proceedings as a whole fell far short of the norm of fairness which a disciplinary tribunal in the position of the CEC may be expected to observe". Consequently, the High Court granted the plaintiff a declaration that the decision of the CEC purporting to expel him from the SDP was unlawful and invalid, and an injunction restraining the SDP from expelling the plaintiff from the SDP or taking any steps to do so.

In the subsequent case of Chng Wei Meng v. Public Prosecutor (2002), the appellant was given, pursuant to section 42A of the Road Traffic Act ("RTA"), a written warning stating that he might be disqualified from driving if he failed to attend court for a traffic offence. An oral warning to the same effect was also given to the appellant. Before the appellant was arrested under section 43(4) of the RTA for driving while under disqualification, he was disqualified from driving after failing to attend court. The appellant appealed against his conviction, claiming inter alia that there had been a breach of natural justice because the written warning and the requirements of section 42A(1)(d) of the RTA were discrepant, since the section provided that he would be disqualified from driving for failure to attend court.

The appellant also submitted that he had not been served a disqualification notice. Chief Justice Yong Pung How dismissed the appeal. He stated that in order for the notice to be vitiated by non-compliance with section 42A, the non-compliance had to be fundamental, substantive and material in nature. However, this was not so on the facts of the case. In addition, to establish a breach of natural justice, the applicant had to prove that he had suffered substantial prejudice or injustice as a result of the non-compliance with section 42A since there is no such thing in law as a technical breach of natural justice. However, on the facts there had been little prejudice caused to the appellant since he had read the notice and knew the consequences of not attending court, but had promptly forgotten all about it.

In Mohammed Aziz bin Ibrahim v. Pertubohan Kebangsaan Melayu Singapura (2004), the plaintiffs, who were members of a political party, the Pertubuhan Kebangsaan Melayu Singapura, had their membership terminated by the party's disciplinary committee in their absence. The plaintiffs alleged they had not been given enough time to prepare their defence. The High Court, in a judgment delivered by Justice Tan Lee Meng, held that there had been a breach of natural justice as the plaintiffs were given inadequate notice of the meeting of the disciplinary committee, and the party had deprived them a reasonable opportunity to prepare their defence against the numerous charges faced by them.

===== Right to be heard =====
When a justiciable issue arises, the decision-maker must give the parties a fair opportunity to present their cases and to correct or contradict any relevant statements prejudicial to them. Generally, it is a denial of natural justice to fail to disclose to a party specific evidence relevant to the decision if he or she is thereby deprived of an opportunity to comment on it.

The right to be heard was found to have been contravened in Kay Swee Pin v. Singapore Island Country Club (2008). The appellant had applied to be a member of the respondent club, and had declared in the application form that a certain individual was her spouse. Soon after, the club's general committee discovered that there were discrepancies in the appellant's marriage certificate. The general committee then charged the appellant with falsely declaring that the individual was her spouse, and referred the matter to the club's disciplinary committee which came to the opposite conclusion. The general committee declined to adopt the disciplinary committee's conclusion and subsequent recommendations, and terminated the appellant's membership.

One of the grounds of the appeal was that there had been breaches of natural justice because, among other things, the appellant had not been given an opportunity to respond to the general committee in the first place. On the Court of Appeal's behalf, Chan Sek Keong C.J. ruled for the appellant. He held that if the general committee had wanted to be the primary fact finder, then it should have allowed the appellant to respond to the allegations of discrepancies in her marriage certificate. Moreover, since the disciplinary committee had heard the appellant and found her explanation credible, the general committee should have asked itself why the former had so concluded.

However, it may not be necessary for a public authority to provide a formal opportunity for a person to make representations before a decision is taken if the person is already aware of the matter and has been given chances to act on it. In Dow Jones Publishing Co. (Asia) Inc. v. Attorney-General (1989), the appellant was owner of a foreign business newspaper, the Asian Wall Street Journal, circulating in Singapore. After some disagreements with the Monetary Authority of Singapore, the Minister for Communications and Information restricted the newspaper's circulation significantly. The appellant applied for certiorari to quash the Minister's decision.

One of the grounds relied upon was that the Minister had not acted fairly as he had failed to give an opportunity to the appellant to explain or otherwise deal with the articles involved. However, Chan Sek Keong J, delivering judgment on behalf of the Court of Appeal, dismissed this argument on the ground that the Minister's failure to give the appellants an opportunity to make representations neither amounted to unfair treatment nor had prejudiced it in any way. This was because the Minister had already issued a warning to the appellant; the appellant had been given many opportunities to publish a letter from the MAS responding to articles published in its newspaper; and, from an earlier case involving Time magazine, the appellant was aware that the circulation of its newspaper might be cut if it declined to publish the MAS's letter.

===== Fair conduct of the hearing =====
The rules of natural justice applies to domestic tribunals which derive their authority from laws enacted by Parliament. An offender brought before a tribunal must not only be given a hearing, but must also be given a fair hearing. Yong Pung How J. discussed this in Wong Kok Chin v. Singapore Society of Accountants (1989):

In our system of justice the process is adversarial and not inquisitorial. This necessarily means, in the case of a Disciplinary Committee of a professional body, that it must approach the issues before it with an open mind, it must also listen to the evidence for and against the offender, and to what he may have to say in his defence; and it must then make up its mind whether, on all the evidence before it, the offender has been proved to be guilty of the offence. In hearing evidence, a Disciplinary Committee may seek clarification on points in the evidence which are not clear, but in doing so it must at all times avoid descending into the arena, and joining in the fray. In the last instance, it is there to judge as best it can; it is not there to supplement the prosecution. It must remember that, in conferring statutory authority on it, Parliament intended that it will act fairly; if it does not do so, it will be acting ultra vires.

The same rule applies to a judge while conducting a trial. In Mohammed Ali bin Johari v. Public Prosecutor, Judge of Appeal Andrew Phang held that a judge must be careful not to descend or be perceived as having descended into the arena, thereby clouding his or her vision and compromising his or her impartiality as well as impeding the fair conduct of the trial by counsel and unsettling the witness concerned.

The pronouncement in Wong Kok Chin was followed in Ng Chee Tiong Tony v. Public Prosecutor (2008), where Justice Lee Seiu Kin set aside the conviction of the trial judge as he had descended into the arena of the trial and joined the fray. Although the trial judge was entitled to seek clarifications, he had gone beyond that by encroaching into the Public Prosecutor's duty to bring out evidence to prove its case when he had asked the sole witness almost as many questions as the Public Prosecutor. Conversely, in Mohammed Ali bin Johari where one of the grounds of appeal against the appellant's conviction for murder was that the trial judge had engaged in excessive judicial interference, the Court of Appeal held that the trial judge had not descended into the arena as he had not interrupted (let alone cross-examined) counsel or the parties in such a manner as to give rise to prejudice or the appearance of prejudice to either party. Neither had it been suggested that the judge was guilty of any of these proscribed actions.

The members of an inquiry tribunal should not communicate independently or privately to any material witness unless they are disclosed straightaway to the parties concerned. In Re Low Fook Cheng Patricia (1998), the appellant, a lawyer, applied to set aside a sanction for misconduct imposed on her by the Law Society of Singapore. Judicial Commissioner Choo Han Teck declared that it "was unfair for the advocate and solicitor concerned to have been adjudged on an issue in which a material witness had given a private statement to a member of the adjudicating tribunal without the knowledge of the advocate and solicitor concerned. By so doing the tribunal pierces the veritable armour of impartiality which every tribunal exercising judicial or quasi-judicial functions must don."

A person coming before a domestic tribunal has no inherent right at common law to be allowed legal representation. If a person is permitted to engage legal counsel but chooses not to, he or she cannot subsequently allege that the rules of natural justice have been breached because he or she is unable to mount an effective defence. The key question is whether the individual concerned was given the opportunity to present their case and whether they suffered prejudice due to any unfairness in way the proceedings were conducted.

In Ho Paul v. Singapore Medical Council (2008), the appellant, a doctor, appealed against the respondent's decision to fine and suspend him for professional misconduct. During the disciplinary proceedings against the appellant before the council, he had not availed himself of legal counsel. One of the main issues raised was whether natural justice had been breached because the appellant had declined to cross-examine the respondent's key witness but the respondent's disciplinary committee had failed to warn him of the "legal implications" of this, and since the disciplinary committee had failed to ensure that the appellant appreciated the importance of making a mitigation plea.

Legal commentators have rephrased the issue as whether the absence of cross-examination renders the decision unfair in all the circumstances. Judge of Appeal V.K. Rajah held that "[a]dditional duties are not foisted on a tribunal merely because the individual is unrepresented – advising a person who has been charged of his litigation strategies and options is the duty of an advocate and solicitor, not the adjudicator". Consequently, there had been no breach of the rules of natural justice as the appellant had been given the opportunity to present his case and cross-examine the witnesses, and had also been invited to make a mitigation plea.

==== Duty to consult and procedural legitimate expectation ====
A duty to consult interested parties before reaching a decision may be imposed by statute, or arise by way of a legitimate expectation on their part. The courts are reluctant to imply a statutory duty to consult in the absence of factors leading to a legitimate expectation, or to imply a duty to consult people other than those actually required by statute to be consulted. A statutory duty to consult is almost invariably regarded as mandatory and, where there is consultation, it must be adequate.

In the absence of a pronouncement by the Singapore courts on this matter, the English decision in R. v. Brent London Borough Council, ex parte Gunning (1985) is useful as Hodgson J. laid out the basic requirements of a legal duty to consult: (1) consultation must be at a time when proposals are at a formative stage; (2) the proposer must give sufficient reasons for any proposal to permit of intelligent consideration and response; (3) adequate time must be given for consideration and response; and (4) the product of consultation must be conscientiously taken into account in finalising any statutory proposals. The decision-maker must carry out the consultation with an open mind, but is not bound by views expressed to it.

A duty to consult an individual who will be affected in advance of the taking of a decision may also arise from a legitimate expectation resulting from a representation given by the public authority to the individual. The origin of this doctrine lies in common law fairness. The legitimate expectation may be "aroused either by a promise or by an established practice of consultation". An example of the former case is Attorney-General of Hong Kong v. Ng Yuen Shiu (1983), where the government of Hong Kong had expressly announced that certain illegal immigrants liable to be deported would be individually interviewed and that their cases would be treated on their merits. An example of the latter is the GCHQ case, where there was a well-established practice of consultation before employment conditions were altered.

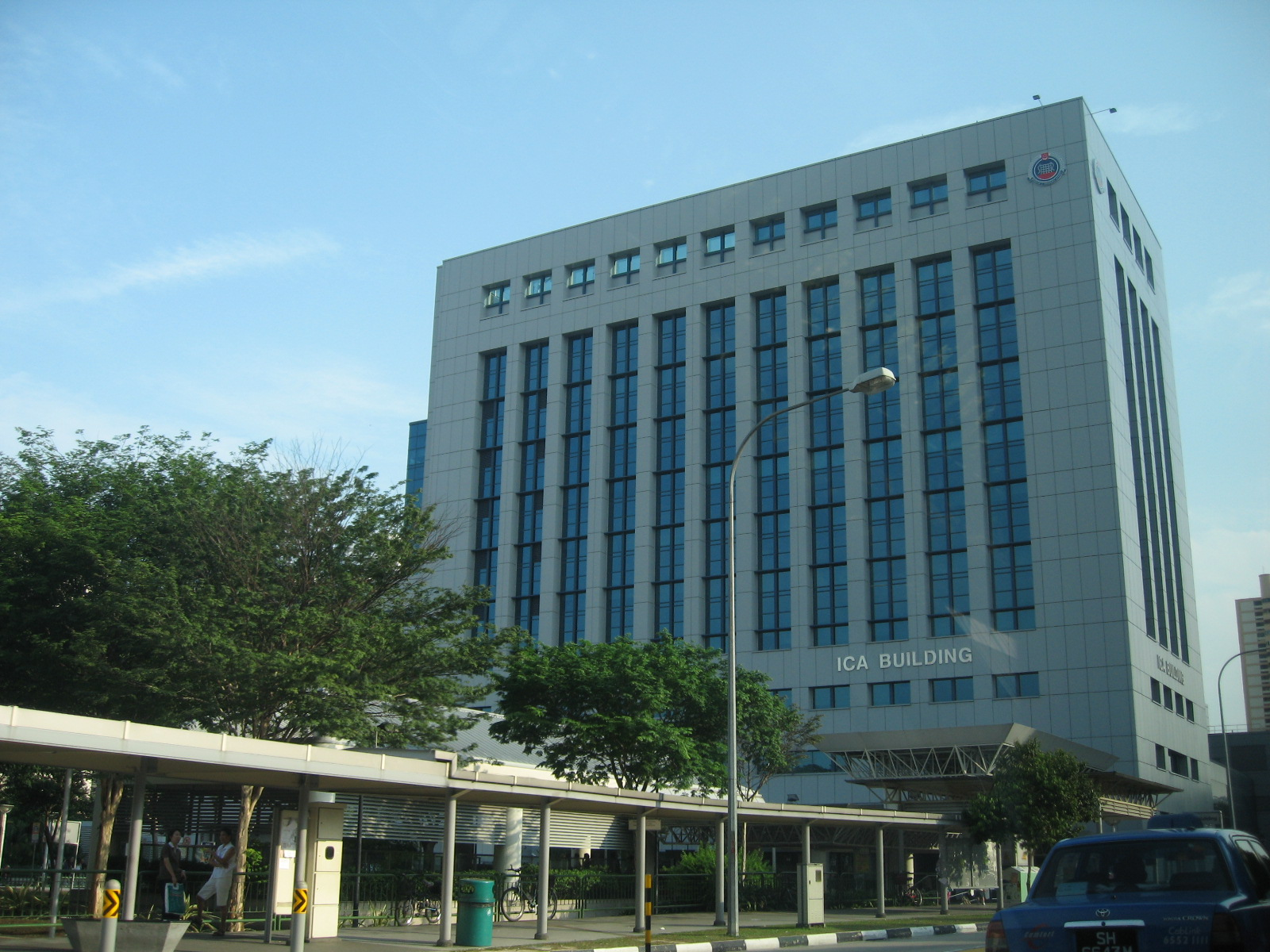
ICA Building, the headquarters of the Immigration and Checkpoints Authority, photographed in July 2006. In a 1986 case brought by a woman who had been declared a prohibited immigrant by the Controller of Immigration, the High Court accepted that the doctrine of procedural legitimate expectation applies in Singapore, but held that the applicant could not avail herself of it.

The existence of the doctrine of procedural legitimate expectation in Singapore was accepted in Siah Mooi Guat. In that case, the applicant, a Malaysian citizen, had been granted a re-entry permit and employment pass valid until 6 March 1987. However, on 5 September 1986, the Controller of Immigration informed her by letter that she had been declared a prohibited immigrant and that her re-entry permit and employment pass had been cancelled. The applicant appealed to the Minister for Home Affairs to reconsider the matter, but the Minister rejected her appeal. The applicant thus took out an application for an order of certiorari to quash the decisions of the Minister and Controller.

Counsel for the applicant argued that the re-entry permit valid till 6 March 1987 gave the applicant a legitimate expectation that she would be allowed to stay in Singapore until the expiry of the permit, and that this legitimate expectation gave her at least two procedural rights: an opportunity to make representations, either orally or in writing, to the Minister before he considered her case; and a duty on the Minister to give reasons for the decision to deem her an undesirable immigrant. In support of the argument, the applicant tried to rely on Schmidt v. Secretary of State for Home Affairs (1968), where Lord Denning M.R. made the obiter statement that where an alien's permit to stay in the country "is revoked before the time limit expires, he ought, I think, to be given an opportunity of making representations: for he would have a legitimate expectation of being allowed to stay for the permitted time".

However, in dismissing the application, the Singapore High Court said that this statement was not supported by English authority and, in any event, Lord Denning had not explained when the opportunity to make representations ought to be given to an alien. Furthermore, no legitimate expectation arose in the applicant's favour as the permit issued to her did not amount to a representation that she could remain in Singapore till its expiry – "no promise whatsoever was made to the applicant that her stay in Singapore was to be conditioned by any considerations other than those provided in the Immigration Act and the regulations thereunder".

Moreover, the Court took the view that the position in Singapore is different from the UK position as Parliament had provided in the Immigration Act for appeals by aggrieved persons against the decisions of the Controller and the Minister. The applicant had, in fact, availed herself of the right to appeal, and the Minister had considered the appeal carefully before rejecting it. Neither at common law nor under the Act was the Minister required to give reasons for his decision.

==== Duty to give reasons ====
At common law there is no general rule which requires reasons to be given for administrative decisions. Similarly, in Siah Mooi Guat, the Singapore High Court held that the Minister for Home Affairs was under no duty at common law nor under the Immigration Act to give reasons for his decision to cancel the applicant's re-entry permit and employment pass. In Singapore, there is also no general statutory requirement for decision-makers to provide reasons. Conversely, some Malaysian cases have endorsed the existence of the duty to give reasons and explained its scope.

However, subject to the requirements of fairness, a decision-maker should consider whether, on the particular facts of the case, reasons should be given. A failure by the decision-maker to provide reasons may justify an inference that its reasons are bad in law or that it has exercised its powers unlawfully. The rationale behind the argument that a decision-maker should provide reasons is that it is one of the cornerstones of a good administration. Furthermore, if some right or interest such as livelihood or property is at stake, or if there is some legitimate expectation, reasons should be given when a decision is adverse to the applicant as a matter of fairness.

== Prospect of codification ==
Unlike Singapore, Australia has a statutory procedure for judicial review – the Administrative Decisions (Judicial Review) Act 1977 ("ADJR Act"), by which application procedures were simplified, grounds of review for judicial review codified, and specific new rights introduced.

It has been proposed that a statutory procedure for judicial review be adopted in other jurisdictions as well. However, looking to Australia's experience, the success of codification is questionable. Whilst codification of the grounds of review did ensure clarity and certainty of the law, one glaring limitation was the exclusion of the possibility of judicial development of additional grounds of review since a code limits a court's ability to change the law to adapt to circumstances. In Re Minister for Immigration and Multicultural Affairs, ex parte Applicant S20/2002 (2003), Justice Michael Kirby expressed concern about the "codification" of the grounds of review, suggesting that the ADJR Act might have "arrested" the development of common law doctrines.

This inhibiting effect can potentially be overcome because the Act contains certain open-ended grounds of review. Section 5(1)(e) states that an application for review can be made on the ground that "the making of the decision was an improper exercise of the power conferred by the enactment in pursuance of which it was purported to be made", and section 5(2)(j) explains that an improper exercise of power includes "any other exercise of a power in a way that constitutes abuse of the power". In addition, section 5(1)(j) permits review of a decision that is "otherwise contrary to law". However, these grounds have been described as being so underused that they can fairly be considered as "dead letters".

Another danger of codification lies in the uncertainty of interpretation of the statute in question. In relation to the ADJR Act, one line of criticism concerns the fear of overreach in the scope of legislation based on the Act, whereas others have criticised the restrictive interpretative approach taken by the Australian courts. For instance, cases such as NEAT Domestic Trading Pty. Ltd. v. AWB (2003) have been criticised for diminishing the reach of the ADJR Act along with public accountability.
