= Professional golf tours =

Organisation of professional golf tournaments

Professional golf tours are the means by which otherwise unconnected professional golf tournaments are organized into a regular schedule. There are separate tours for men and women; most are based in a specific geographical region, although some tours may hold tournaments in other parts of the world.

At least 95% of professional golfers make their primary income as club or teaching professionals rather than from competition. A small elite in the profession who obtain income from prize money and endorsements are called "touring professionals", "tournament golfers", or "pro golfers". The best golfers can make up to 8-figure incomes in U.S. dollars from tournament play. Including endorsement income, pro golfer Tiger Woods was the highest earning sportsman for much of the first decade of the 21st century, according to Forbes magazine.

Tournaments have entry fees and the associated costs of travel and lodging, plus the hire of a caddie. Moreover, most tournaments have a "cut" after the second of four rounds, meaning that only the top half or so continue play. Only those who make the cut receive any prize money, and only the top players take home significant winnings.

== History ==
In the early days of professional golf, in each region of the world each professional tournament was established by a separate golf club, golf organisation or commercial sponsor. As the number of tournaments increased, the most talented professional golfers concentrated mainly on playing in tournaments rather than on club professional and golf instruction work. Once a good number of tournaments were being played in a region each year, they were formalised into a tour, which was supervised by a single organisation, although many tournaments continue to be run by separate bodies.

The PGA Tour was the pioneer of the tour system, and its establishment date is not very clearly defined. The PGA of America was established in 1916. Lists of players with the most wins in each season are available from that year, and career win totals are based on results from 1916 onwards. However, the idea of a tour had not firmly crystallised at that time and several developments came much later. Bob Harlow was named manager of the PGA Tournament Bureau in 1930, the first "playing pros" organisation was formed in 1932, and money lists are available from 1934. However the PGA Tour itself dates the formal establishment of the Tour to 1968, when the "Tournament Players Division" split from the PGA of America. Similarly, the European Tour officially began in 1972, although it evolved from the British PGA circuit which merged with the Continental European circuit in 1977 before fully separating from the PGA in 1984. The dates of establishment of the other key tours include: LPGA Tour (1950); Sunshine Tour (1971), Japan Golf Tour (1973); PGA Tour of Australasia (1973), Asian Tour (1995). The Asian Tour was preceded by the Asia Golf Circuit, which operated from 1962 until 1999. The term "circuit" is often used to describe groups of professional golf tournaments, either organised tours, which may or may not include unofficial events, or simply to broadly categorize events in a local area or wider region.

As professional golf has continued to expand developmental tours such as the Challenge Tour (1986) and the Web.com Tour (1990; originally called the Ben Hogan Tour and later the Korn Ferry Tour) and senior tours such as PGA Tour Champions (1980; originally the Senior PGA Tour and later the Champions Tour) and the Legends Tour (1992; originally the European Senior Tour) have been established to give more golfers the opportunity to play on a tour, and to take advantage of the willingness of sponsors and broadcasters to fund an ever-increasing number of tournaments.

== Structure of tour golf ==
There are more than twenty professional golf tours, each run by a Professional Golfers Association or an independent tour organisation which is responsible for arranging events, finding sponsors, and regulating the tour. Most of the major tours are player controlled organisations whose commercial objective is to maximise the income of their members by maximising prize money. The larger tours have a tournament almost every week through most of the year.

Each tour has members who have earned their tour cards, meaning they are entitled to play in most of the tour's events. A golfer can become a member of a leading tour by succeeding in an entry tournament, usually called a Qualifying School (Q-School); or, by achieving a designated level of success in its tournaments when competing as an invited non-member; or, much rarer, by having enough notable achievements on other tours to make them a desirable member. Membership of some of the lesser tours is open to any registered professional who pays an entry fee.

There are differences in the financial rewards offered by the various golf tours. For example, the PGA Tour, which is the first-tier tour in the United States, offers nearly a hundred times as much prize money each season as the third-tier NGA Pro Golf Tour. The hierarchy of tours in financial terms, as of 2024, is as follows:

- Clear 1st: PGA Tour
- Clear 2nd: European Tour
- Clear 3rd: LPGA Tour
- Clear 4th: PGA Tour Champions
- Fifth to eighth (in alphabetical order): Asian Tour; Japan Golf Tour; LIV Golf; LPGA of Japan Tour

In the 1990s the Japan Golf Tour was the third richest tour, but in recent years its number of tournaments has been steadily contracting from a peak of 44 in 1990 to 24 in 2007, and tournament purses have risen only slowly. The (U.S.) LPGA saw a substantial decline in financial rewards in the late 2000s; when its commissioner Carolyn Bivens was forced to resign by a player revolt in 2009, it had only 14 events locked in for 2010. Its 2010 schedule was ultimately unveiled with 24 events, down from 34 as recently as 2008. The tour saw signs of recovery in 2012, with the addition of three new events, the sanctioning of a tournament in Australia, and the return of one tournament that had been off the schedule for a year. By 2014, the LPGA had largely recovered from its 2010 trough, with that year's schedule consisting of 33 events.

The late-2000s economic crisis did not have an immediate impact on the PGA Tour, mainly because most of its tournament sponsors were locked in through 2010; there was media speculation that the expiration of those sponsorship contracts in 2011 would see substantial changes in the landscape of that tour. However, this speculation proved misplaced or at least premature, as the 2011 season was announced with only one less official money event than in 2010, with virtually identical prize money. The Asian Tour and the LPGA of Japan Tour enjoyed rapid growth in prize money in the early 2000s, and were less affected by the economic crisis than the U.S. LPGA.

== Men's tours ==
=== International Federation of PGA Tours ===
The International Federation of PGA Tours is an organization founded in 1996 to enable the world's leading tours to discuss common and global issues in professional golf. The founding members were

- the United States–based PGA Tour
- the PGA European Tour
- the Japan Golf Tour
- PGA Tour of Australasia
- the Southern Africa–based Sunshine Tour

In 1999 they were joined by the Asian Tour and a year later the Canadian Tour became an associate member. The South and Central America based Tour de las Américas became the federation's second associate member in 2007.

In 2009 the federation announced a major expansion, as the Tour de las Américas and the Canadian Tour became full members alongside nine new members. They were

- the PGA Tour China
- the Korean Tour
- the Professional Golf Tour of India
- organizers of the six major Ladies tours (see below)

In 2011, the Tour de las Américas was effectively taken over by the PGA Tour, then, after the Tour de las Américas held its 2012 season, it was folded into the new PGA Tour Latinoamérica. In October 2012, the Canadian Tour agreed to be taken over by the PGA Tour, with a name change to PGA Tour Canada taking effect that November. In 2024, both Tours were combined to create the PGA Tour Americas.

The International Federation of PGA Tours founded the World Golf Championships in 1999 and sanction the Official World Golf Ranking.

=== Other men's tours ===
World ranking points are also awarded for good placings in events on three developmental tours:

- Challenge Tour (second-tier tour to the European Tour)
- Korn Ferry Tour (second-tier tour to the PGA Tour)
- Asian Development Tour (second-tier tour to the Asian Tour), since 2013

In addition, until 2017 the OneAsia Tour, founded in 2009 as a joint venture between the PGA Tour of Australasia, the China Golf Association, the Japan Golf Tour, the Korean Golf Association and the Korean PGA, used to offer world ranking points.

The richest tour not offering ranking points was until 2011 the Korean Tour.

The official development tour in Japan is the Japan Challenge Tour. Other regional tours include the Professional Golf Tour of India, PGA Tour China and All Thailand Golf Tour.

The United States and Europe have additional tours for players who have not made it onto the Korn Ferry Tour or the Challenge Tour. At this level the prize money is partly funded by entrance fees. Some of the players will also play on other tours, and others will be club or teaching professionals who play tournament golf part-time.

In Europe there is a third tier of tours, known as the Satellite Tours, which are independently operated but offer promotion to the Challenge Tour for the most successful players. These are the PGA EuroPro Tour, the Alps Tour, the Pro Golf Tour and the Nordic Golf League. Starting July 2015, the four Europe-based third-tier tours was accepted into the OWGR rankings. Below this level there are various minor professional tournaments, some of which are organised into series by national golf associations.

In 2016, the Dubai-based MENA Golf Tour announced an affiliation with the Sunshine Tour and was included into the world ranking system. Starting in 2018, the Sunshine Tour-affiliated Big Easy Tour was added to the world rankings.

Three lower-level tours offer world ranking points and direct promotion to the Korn Ferry Tour for a top five finish on their Orders of Merit: PGA Tour Americas and PGA Tour China.

There is not a US-based third tier. The larger regional tours include the Swing Thought Tour, Gateway Tour, and the APT Tour there is a constantly changing roster of small "mini-tours".

Below Korn Ferry Tour level there is little possibility of earning a living from the prize money alone and players compete to gain competitive experience. After the new Korn Ferry Tour Finals was established in 2013, mini-tour purses have decreased and players have moved to the Canada and Latin American tours.

There have been some sportsmen from other sports who, after retiring, but still at an age when elite golfers are in their prime, have played as tournament golfers on the developmental tours. Examples include Ivan Lendl and Roy Wegerle. Two have had modest success on the PGA Tour Champions for golfers 50 and over. Former National Football League quarterback John Brodie won one tournament and had 12 top-10 finishes on that tour, and former Major League Baseball pitcher Rick Rhoden had three top-10 finishes.

=== Men's senior tours ===
Upon reaching age 50, male golfers are eligible to compete in senior tournaments. A number of players win more than a million dollars in prize money each season, and once endorsements and other business activities are taken into account, a few of the players in this age group earn as much as the younger PGA Tour pros. The two main senior tours are:

- PGA Tour Champions (based in the United States)
- Legends Tour (formerly known as the European Senior Tour, and sponsored as the Staysure Tour)

== Women's tours ==
Women's professional golf is organized by independent regional tours. Leading female golfers make incomes well over US$1 million per year. There are currently seven first tier regional tours:

- LPGA Tour (based in the United States)
- Ladies European Tour
- LPGA of Japan Tour
- LPGA of Korea Tour
- Ladies Asian Golf Tour, for Asia outside Japan and Korea
- WPGA Tour of Australasia, based in Australia
- Sunshine Ladies Tour, based in South Africa

The LPGA Tour is the dominant tour, and is the main playing base of almost all the world's leading players. It also has tournaments in Canada, Mexico, France, United Kingdom, Australia, China, Taiwan, Japan, South Korea, Malaysia and other Asian countries. The LPGA of Japan Tour is the second richest tour, and retains many of its leading players.

The second tier women's professional tour in the United States is the Epson Tour (formerly the Futures and then the Symetra). Although there is little opportunity for women's developmental play on the professional level in the United States besides the Epson Tour, women are welcome to compete against men on some mini-tours. At a lower level is the Cactus Tour, founded in 2005, which plays in the American Southwest. It expanded to hold 38 events in 2020, while the LPGA and Epson suspended play from April to August.

Sweden, which is the European country where women's golf is most popular, had its own Swedish Golf Tour, established in 1986, since 2021 transformed to the Nordic Golf Tour, operated in cooperation by the golf federations in Denmark and Norway and Sweden.

The LET Access Series, launched in 2010, is the developmental tour of Ladies European Tour. The LPGA of Japan operates the Step Up Tour as a feeder for its main tour, and the LPGA of Korea operates two mini-tours (Dream Tour and Jump Tour) that effectively serve as feeders for its main tour.

=== Women's senior tours ===
In 2001, the U.S.-based Women's Senior Golf Tour was founded, featuring golfers 45 and over. In 2006, it was rebranded as the Legends Tour and in 2021 The Legends of the LPGA. The LPGA of Korea now operates the Akia Tour, a four-event mini-tour for the same age group.
