= Haarlow =

Haarlow is a surname. Notable people with the surname include:

- Bill Haarlow (1913–2003), American basketball player
- Rebecca Haarlow (born 1978), American anchor

== See also ==
- Harlow (disambiguation)
