= Legitimate expectation in Singapore law =

Singapore legal doctrine allowing judicial review

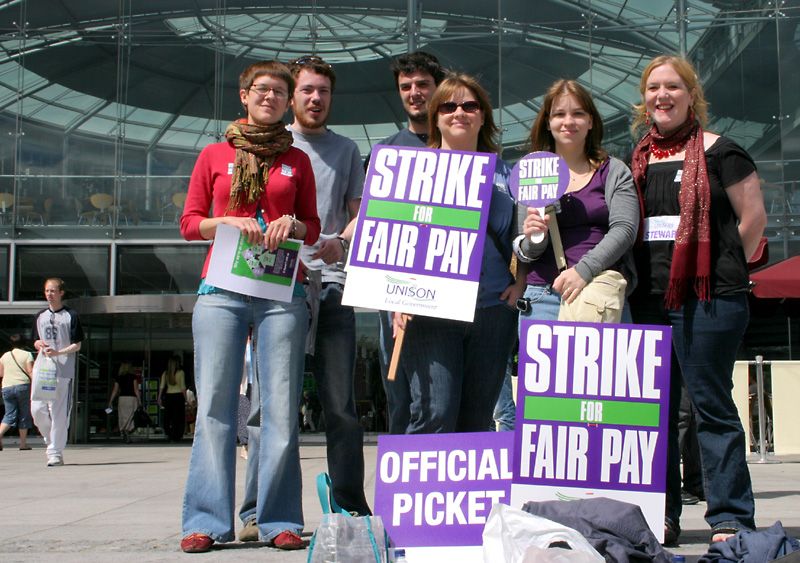
Members of the largely public-sector trade union UNISON on strike for better pay at The Forum in Norwich, UK, in July 2008. In both the UK and Singapore, where a public authority has made a clear representation to individuals regarding a certain policy position it has taken, such as their remuneration, these persons have a legitimate expectation to be consulted before the policy is changed, and possibly also a legitimate expectation that the original policy should apply to them.

The doctrine of legitimate expectation in Singapore protects both procedural and substantive rights. In administrative law, a legitimate expectation generally arises when there has been a representation of a certain outcome by the public authorities to an individual. To derogate from the representation may amount to an abuse of power or unfairness. The doctrine of legitimate expectation as a ground to quash decisions of public authorities has been firmly established by the English courts. Thus, where a public authority has made a representation to an individual who would be affected by a decision by the authority, the individual has a legitimate expectation to have his or her views heard before the decision is taken. Alternatively, an individual may also have a legitimate expectation to a substantive right. The recognition of substantive legitimate expectations is somewhat controversial as it requires a balancing of the requirements of fairness against the reasons for any change in the authority's policy. This suggests the adoption of a free-standing proportionality approach, which has been said not to apply in administrative law.

The procedural dimension of the doctrine of legitimate expectation has been recognized by Singapore courts and, since 2013, the substantive form of the doctrine as well. However, whether the courts will adopt the UK approach with regard to measuring legitimate expectation with the ruler of proportionality remains an open question.

== Development of the doctrine in the English courts ==
=== Legitimate expectation of a procedural right ===
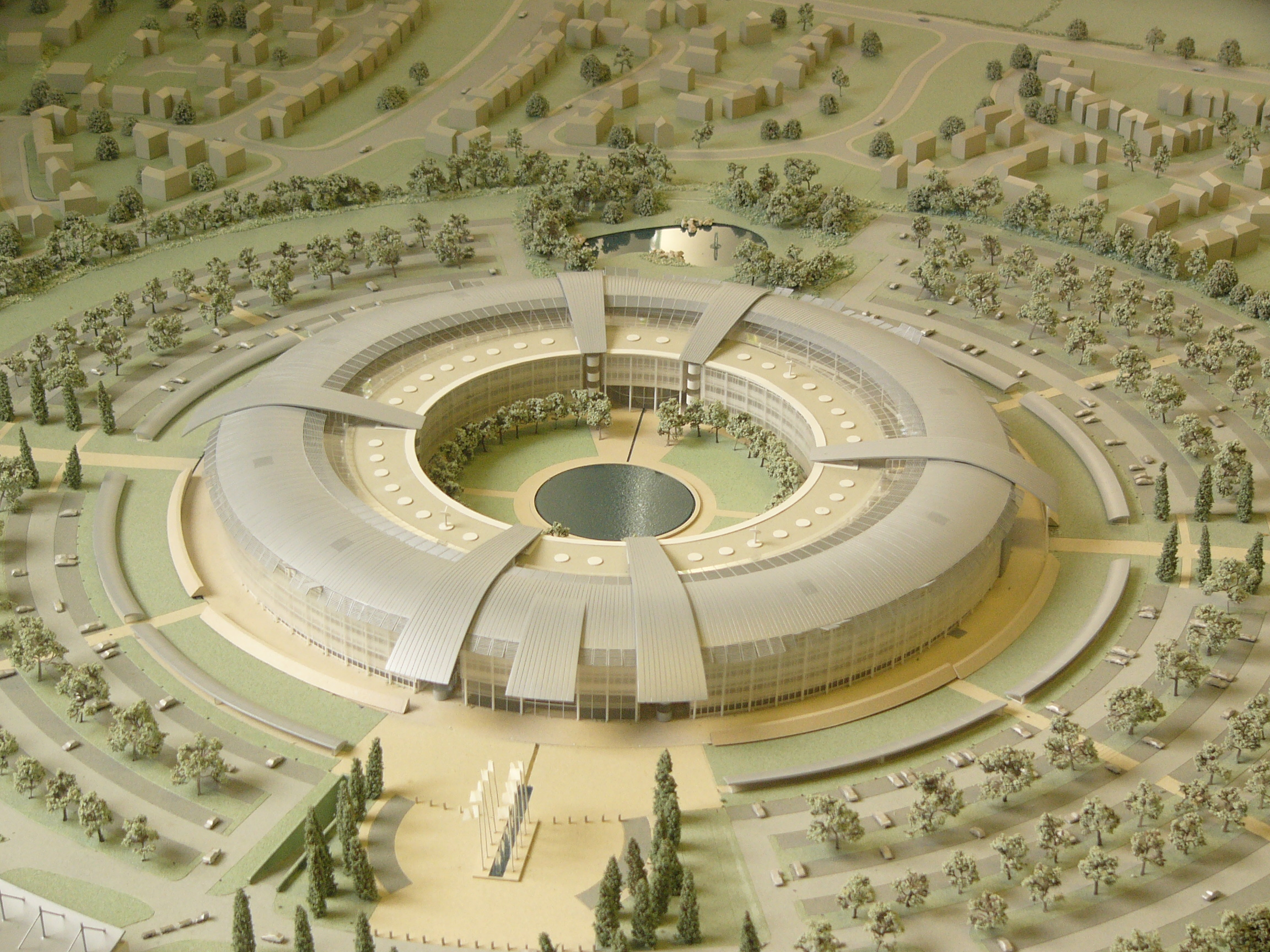
A model of Government Communications Headquarters (GCHQ) in Cheltenham, UK, popularly known as "The Doughnut". A 1983 case decided by the House of Lords involving GCHQ employees established the principle that a clear representation by a public authority that it will hold a consultation before making a decision can give rise to a legitimate expectation that such a consultation, and that a decision can be quashed if the expectation is not fulfilled.

The doctrine of legitimate expectation originates from common law principles of fairness. English courts developed this doctrine largely to encourage good administration and prevent abuses by decision-makers. Generally, the courts will grant judicial review of an administrative decision based on an individual's legitimate expectation if a public authority has made a representation to the individual within its powers. The individual has to show that the representation was a clear and unambiguous promise, an established practice or a public announcement. This is largely a factual inquiry.

The key idea is that under certain circumstances where a representation has been made by a public authority to an individual who would be affected by a decision by the authority, the individual expects to be heard before the decision is made. To deny the right to be heard amounts to unfairness. The court will thus be inclined to quash a decision if there has been unfairness and reliance by the individual on the representation to his detriment. This is demonstrated in the 1983 House of Lords decision Council of Civil Service Unions v. Minister for the Civil Service (the GCHQ case). This case involved the trade unions of employees of the Government Communications Headquarters (GCHQ), a government signals and intelligence department, who argued that they had an expectation to be consulted before the Minister took the decision to deny them the right to join trade unions. The Minister argued that it had been necessary to take that step as the trade unions were conducting strikes that crippled GCHQ operations and threatened the national security of the United Kingdom. The Court established that in the past the trade unions had been consulted on employment-related matters, even though it was not a rule. However, their Lordships clearly recognized that an individual can have a legitimate expectation to be consulted before a decision is taken when it is proven that this is the practice. Such a representation can come in the form of a clear and unambiguous promise to hear the individual or an established practice to consult those affected before taking the decision. Nonetheless, on the facts of the case, their Lordships agreed that they could not review the Minister's decision even though there was an enforceable legitimate expectation as the decision had been made on national security grounds.

=== Legitimate expectation of a substantive benefit ===
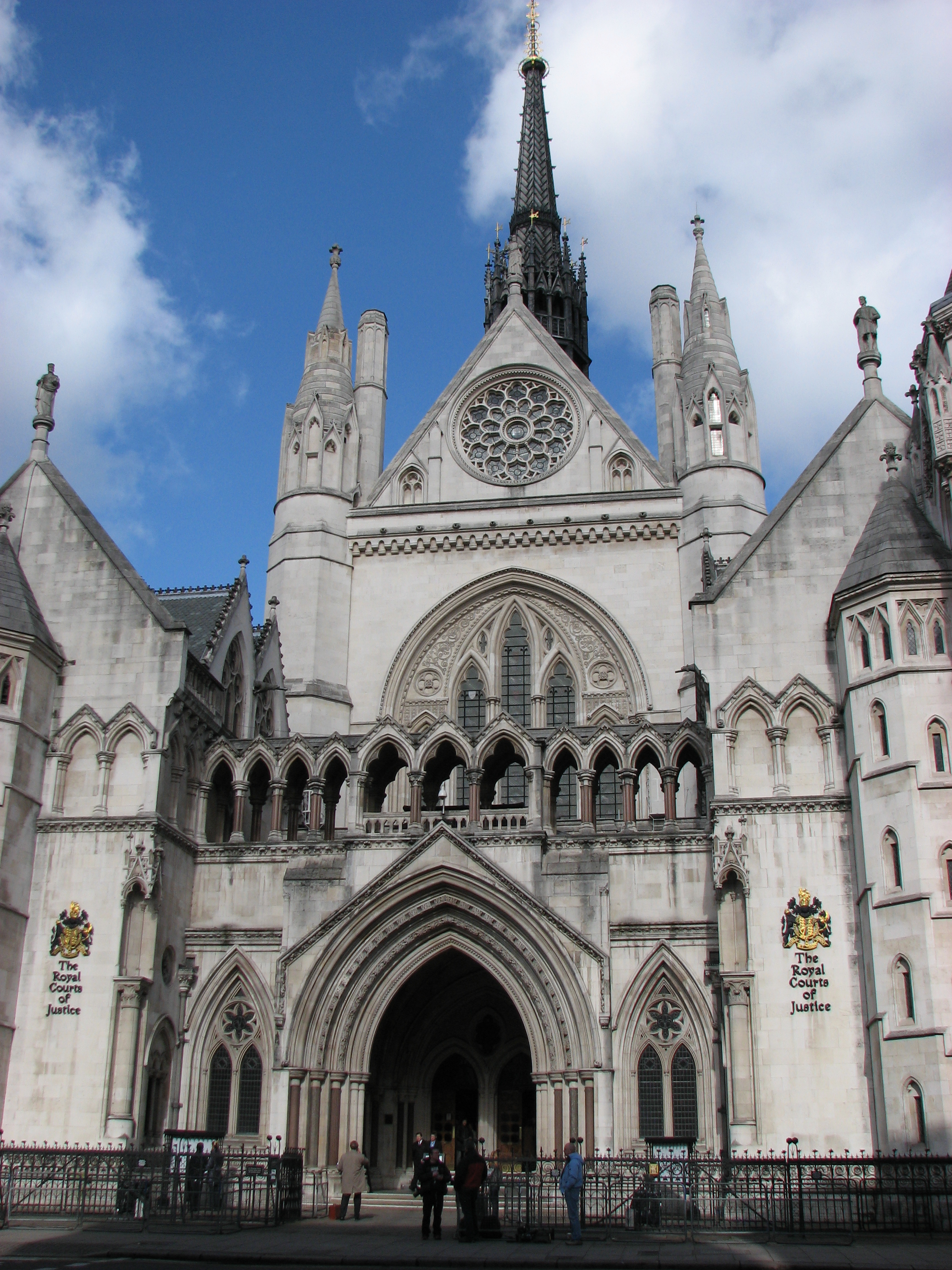
The Royal Courts of Justice in London, where the Court of Appeal of England and Wales sits. In a 1999 case, the Court controversially held that individuals can have a legitimate expectation to receive a substantive benefit, not merely a procedural right.

The English courts initially wavered in recognizing that an individual has a legitimate expectation of a substantive benefit arising from a representation from the authorities. The notion of protecting a substantive legitimate expectation was espoused in the 1995 High Court decision in R. v. Ministry of Agriculture, Fisheries and Food, ex parte Hamble (Off-shore) Fisheries Ltd. In that controversial case, Justice Stephen Sedley formulated the framework for legitimate expectations as the balance of the requirements of fairness against the decision-maker's reasons to change the policy. This was in step with the development of the doctrine of proportionality as prescribed in the Treaty on European Union, and in European Court of Justice case law. The decision wove proportionality back into the fabric of judicial review in the UK under the banner of an expanding doctrine of "fair administration" despite the clear rejection of proportionality as a self-standing ground of review by the House of Lords in R. v. Secretary of State for the Home Department, ex parte Brind (1991).

In 1996, the Court of Appeal opined in R. v. Secretary of State for the Home Department, ex parte Hargreaves that "[o]n matters of substance (as contrasted with procedure) Wednesbury provides the correct test". In Associated Provincial Picture Houses v. Wednesbury Corporation (1947), the High Court had introduced the idea of Wednesbury unreasonableness, that is, a public authority's decision is unlawful if, although they have "kept within the four corners of the matters they ought to consider, they have nevertheless come to a conclusion so unreasonable that no reasonable authority could ever have come to it". The inference to be made from ex parte Hargreaves was that where an applicant claimed to have a substantive expectation, it was not for the court to judge if that expectation should be protected vis-à-vis the broader public interest. The court should only intervene if the decision-maker's exercise of its discretion satisfied the Wednesbury threshold.

However, the courts' role in protecting substantive legitimate expectations was clearly established by the Court of Appeal of England and Wales in R. v. North and East Devon Health Authority, ex parte Coughlan (1999). The case involved an applicant who was promised by her local authority that a new nursing home would be her "home for life". The Court granted the application for review on the ground that the applicant had a legitimate expectation to have the substantive benefit of staying in the nursing home as promised by the local authority. It also set out the approach to be taken in safeguarding procedural and substantive legitimate expectations. Where procedural legitimate expectations were concerned, courts would require an opportunity for consultation to be given unless there was an overriding reason to resile from it (such as the national security concern that arose in the GCHQ case). As regards substantive legitimate expectations, courts would decide whether cases lie "... in what may inelegantly be called the macro-political field", or are those "where the expectation is confined to one person or a few people, giving the promise or representation the character of a contract". In the first situation, the public authority "is only required to bear in mind its previous policy or other representation, giving it the weight it thinks right, but no more, before deciding whether to change course", and the court may only review the authority's decision on the ground of Wednesbury unreasonableness. On the other hand, when assessing a case in the second situation, the court decides whether for an authority to frustrate an expectation is so unfair that it amounts to an abuse of power. The court must weigh the requirements of fairness towards the individual against any overriding interests relied by the authorities to justify the change of policy.

A slightly different approach has been adopted by Lord Justice of Appeal John Laws. In R. v. Secretary of State for Education and Employment, ex parte Begbie (1999), he suggested that the Coughlan categories are not "hermetically sealed", and in Nadarajah v. Secretary of State for the Home Department (2005), he expanded on this by taking a proportionality approach:

[A] public body's promise or practice as to future conduct may only be denied ... in circumstances where to do so is the public body's legal duty, or is otherwise ... a proportionate response (of which the court is the judge, or the last judge) having regard to a legitimate aim pursued by the public body in the public interest.

In Coughlan the view was expressed that the court will assess whether it is unfair for an authority to frustrate a legitimate expectation when the expectation is "confined to one person or a few people, giving the promise or representation the character of a contract". In R. (Bancoult) v. Secretary of State for Foreign and Commonwealth Affairs (No. 2) (2007), it was accepted that members of a group of close to a thousand or even up to several thousand people could have a legitimate expectation of a substantive benefit following the government's announcement of its intentions.

Where a person convinces the court that his or her substantive legitimate expectation has been frustrated, the usual remedy is for the court to order that the public authority fulfil the expectation. However, in R. (Bibi) v. Newham London Borough Council (2001) it was held that when the decision in question is "informed by social and political value judgments as to priorities of expenditure" it is more appropriate for the authority to make the decision, and the court may order that the authority should merely reconsider its decision, taking into account the person's substantive legitimate expectation.

Coughlan has been criticized for allowing the doctrine of proportionality to affect administrative law, as the court has to judge the merits of a case when granting a review on grounds of substantive legitimate expectation and, in a sense, usurp the discretion of the executive branch of government. This is arguably inconsistent with the court's traditional role in judicial review which is to avoid examining the merits of administrative decisions and only scrutinize them for compliance with the law.

== Singapore ==
=== Legitimate expectation of a procedural right ===
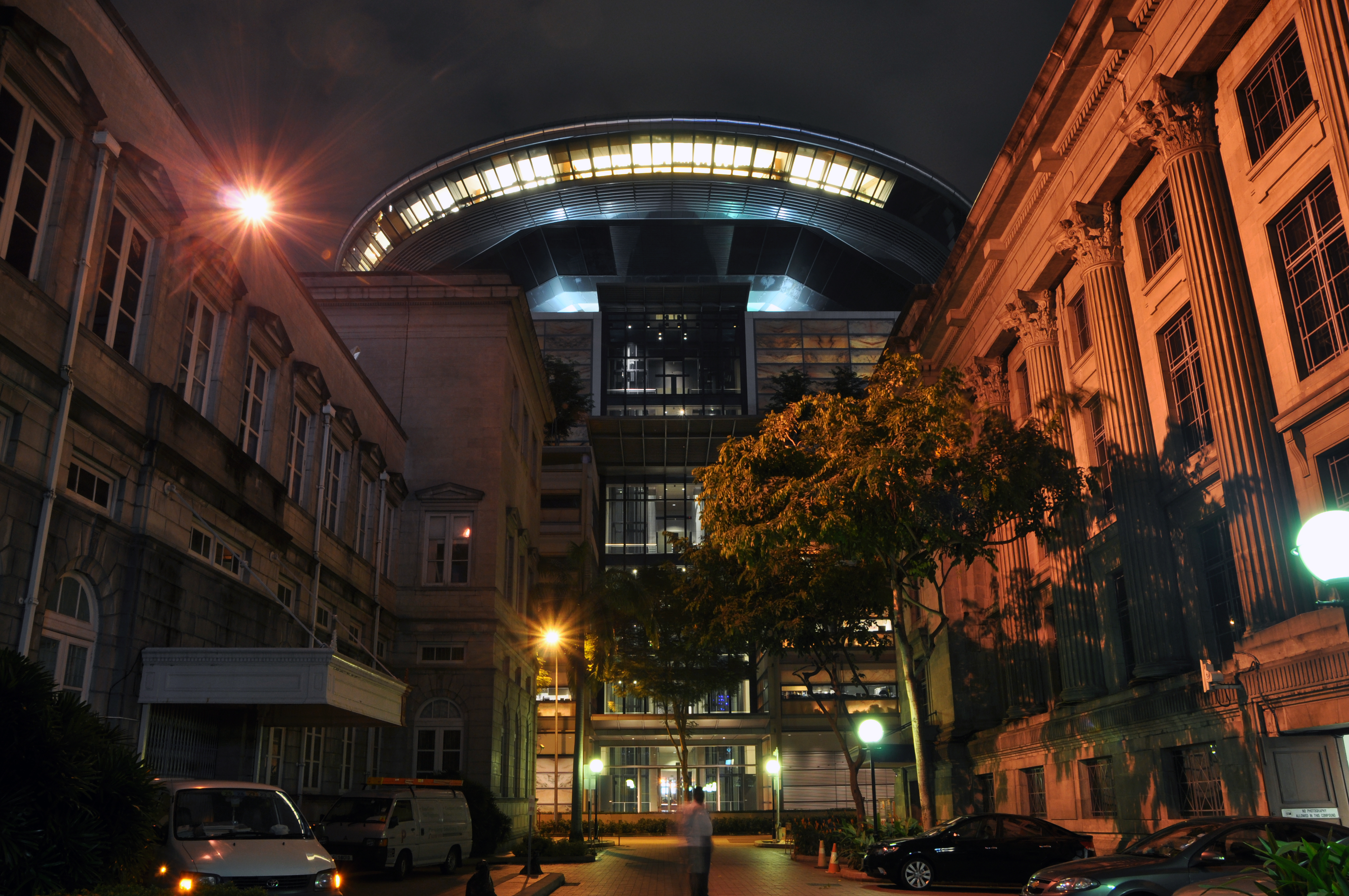
A night view of the Supreme Court of Singapore from the lane between the Old Supreme Court Building and City Hall. The existence of the legitimate expectation doctrine has been accepted by the Singapore courts.

Singaporean courts have accepted the existence of both procedural and substantive legitimate expectations. In Re Siah Mooi Guat (1988), the applicant was a Malaysian national who was declared a prohibited immigrant under section 8(3)(k) of the Immigration Act and had her re-entry permit to Singapore and employment pass cancelled. As the applicant's appeal to the Minister for Home Affairs was rejected, the applicant took out an application to the High Court to quash the decision of the Minister. One ground of the application was that the applicant had a legitimate expectation to two procedural rights: the opportunity to make representations to the Minister before he considered her case under the Immigration Act, and the duty of the Minister to give reasons for his decision.

In his judgment, Justice T. S. Sinnathuray considered Schmidt v. Secretary of State for Home Affairs (1968), decided by the Court of Appeal of England and Wales. He found that the procedural principles that govern the administration of Singapore's immigration laws were similar to those in the UK. In Schmidt it was decided that an alien has no right to enter the country except by leave and the Home Secretary can refuse leave without giving any reason; that if an alien is given leave to enter the country for a limited period he has no right to stay, and no legitimate expectation of being allowed to stay, for a day longer than the permitted period; and that an alien's application for an extension of his stay can be refused without reasons and without a hearing as the rules of natural justice do not apply. Furthermore, in Schmidt Lord Denning had espoused the obiter view that where an alien's permit to stay "is revoked before the time limit expires, he ought ... to be given the opportunity of making representations: for he would have a legitimate expectation of being allowed to stay for a permitted time". This argument was advanced by Siah's counsel to persuade the court that "an alien who is in possession of an entry permit which has not yet expired is in the country lawfully until the date of expiry and, therefore, he has an interest during the unexpired portion that carries with it a public law right to a fair procedure, if and when the minister desires to terminate that leave to stay prematurely". The High Court judge considered this proposition and conceded that it was an "attractive" one. However, he ultimately dismissed the argument by saying that it had "not been supported by any English authority", and that the position in Singapore is "quite different". He stated that Parliament had already provided in the Immigration Act for appeals and the right to be heard has been given statutory recognition and protection in the Act, and the applicant had already availed herself of the right to appeal. The Minister was not required to give reasons for his rejection of the appeal under the common law or the Immigration Act.

=== Legitimate expectation of a substantive benefit ===
The existence of the doctrine of substantive legitimate expectation in Singapore public law was accepted by the Court of Appeal in the case of Abdul Nasir bin Amer Hamsah v. Public Prosecutor. In his judgment written on behalf of the Court, Chief Justice Yong Pung How stated that the idea behind the doctrine is that certain "expectations could, in suitable circumstances, be deserving of protection, even though they did not acquire the force of a legal right". Nonetheless, the Court stated: "[W]e were not concerned with judicial review, nor were we deciding whether any claim of a legitimate expectation could estop the Prisons Department in future from applying the interpretation which we gave to life imprisonment. That was a separate matter which was not under consideration here."

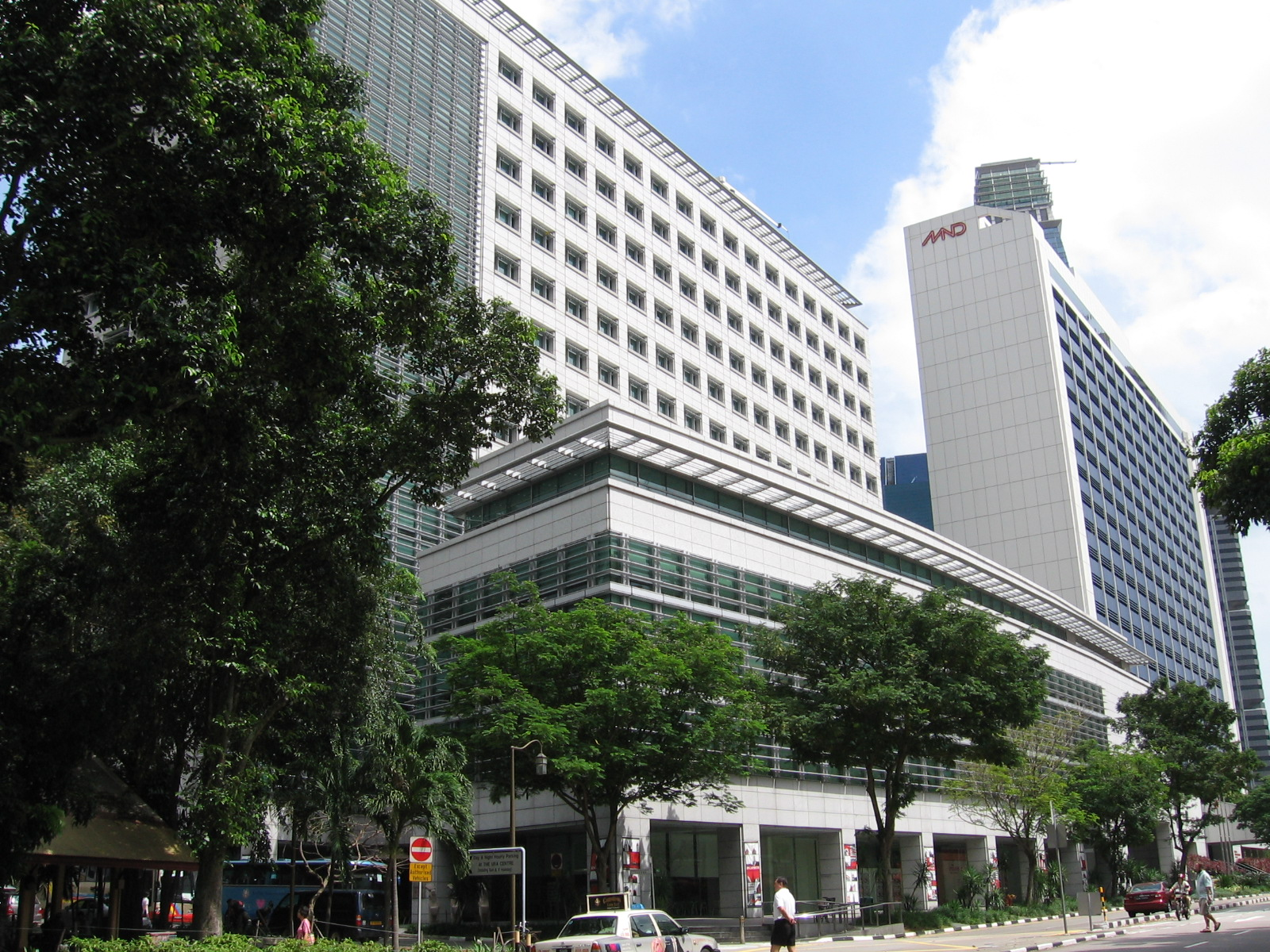
The URA Centre, photographed in January 2006. A 2009 decision of the High Court involving the Urban Redevelopment Authority (URA) confirmed that the doctrine of substantive legitimate expectation applies in Singapore.

Other decided cases also do not indicate whether the doctrine of substantive legitimate expectation will be developed in the way it has been developed in the UK. In Siah Mooi Guat, another argument the applicant raised was that she had a legitimate expectation to continue to reside in Singapore until the expiry of her re-entry permit. Sinnathuray J. distinguished Attorney-General of Hong Kong v. Ng Yuen Shiu (1983), a Privy Council case on appeal from Hong Kong, from the case at hand. In the Privy Council case there had been an express promise made to Ng by the Government of Hong Kong which had created a substantive legitimate expectation. In the present case, no promise had been made to be applicant that her stay in Singapore was to be conditioned by any considerations other than those provided in the Immigration Act and related regulations. No substantive legitimate expectation arose in the applicant's favour, following the dictum of Lord Fraser of Tullybelton in the GCHQ case that legitimate expectation arises "either from an express promise given on behalf of a public authority or from the existence of a regular practice which the claimant can reasonably expect to continue". Thus, the judge did not discuss the detailed legal rules to be applied to determine when an aggrieved person may be said to have a legitimate expectation to a substantive right.

In Borissik Svetlana v. Urban Redevelopment Authority (2009), the applicant and her husband owned a semi-detached house which they wished to redevelop. In 2002, the Urban Redevelopment Authority (URA) had issued a circular imposing certain restrictions on the redevelopment of semi-detached houses. The URA rejected the applicant's redevelopment application on the basis of the circular. Counsel for the applicant argued before the High Court that the applicant had a legitimate expectation that the proposal to redevelop the house would be approved. The Court held that the URA had not acted in a way that could have led the applicant to have such a legitimate expectation. It adopted four conditions set out in De Smith's Judicial Review (6th ed., 2007) to determine whether a legitimate expectation has been created: the public body's representation must be clear, unambiguous and devoid of any relevant qualification; induced by the conduct of the decision-maker; made by a person with actual or ostensible authority; and applicable to the applicant, who belongs to the class of persons to whom the representation is reasonably expected to apply. The only legitimate expectation that could have arisen after the 2002 circular had been issued was that the URA would act in accordance with those guidelines unless the circumstances were such that an exception has to be made. The applicant in Borissik argued that she had a legitimate expectation to a substantive right, but since the Court decided that the URA had made no clear representation to her, it did not make any pronouncements on the approach that should be taken towards substantive legitimate expectations in Singapore.

In UDL Marine (Singapore) Pte. Ltd. v. Jurong Town Corp. (2011), the High Court "entertain[ed] some doubt" as to whether the doctrine of substantive legitimate expectation is part of Singapore law, but did not discuss the matter further as neither the respondent nor the Attorney-General had made submissions on the issue. Subsequently, however, in Chiu Teng @ Kallang Pte. Ltd. v. Singapore Land Authority (2013) a differently constituted High Court held that substantive legitimate expectation should be recognized as a ground of judicial review if the following conditions are satisfied:

(a) The applicant must prove that the statement or representation made by the public authority was unequivocal and unqualified;

(i) if the statement or representation is open to more than one natural interpretation, the interpretation applied by the public authority will be adopted; and
(ii) the presence of a disclaimer or non-reliance clause would cause the statement or representation to be qualified.

(b) The applicant must prove the statement or representation was made by someone with actual or ostensible authority to do so on behalf of the public authority.
(c) The applicant must prove that the statement or representation was made to him or to a class of persons to which he clearly belongs. (d) The applicant must prove that it was reasonable for him to rely on the statement or representation in the circumstances of his case:

(i) if the applicant knew that the statement or representation was made in error and chose to capitalise on the error, he will not be entitled to any relief;
(ii) similarly, if he suspected that the statement or representation was made in error and chose not to seek clarification when he could have done so, he will not be entitled to any relief;
(iii) if there is reason and opportunity to make enquiries and the applicant did not, he will not be entitled to any relief.

(e) The applicant must prove that he did rely on the statement or representation and that he suffered a detriment as a result.
(f) Even if all the above requirements are met, the court should nevertheless not grant relief if:

(i) giving effect to the statement or representation will result in a breach of the law or the State’s international obligations;
(ii) giving effect to the statement or representation will infringe the accrued rights of some member of the public;
(iii) the public authority can show an overriding national or public interest which justifies the frustration of the applicant's expectation.

== Assessment ==
Academics have expressed scepticism as to whether the doctrine of legitimate expectation should apply to substantive rights. Thio Li-ann argues that legitimate expectations should relate only to procedural rather than substantive rights. Procedural protection only has a minimal impact on the administrative autonomy of the relevant public authority, since the court is only concerned with the manner in which the decision was made and not whether the decision was fair. Thus, the ultimate autonomy of public authorities is never placed in jeopardy. Conversely, as Mark Elliot posits, giving effect to a substantive legitimate expectation impinges on the separation of powers. The authority has been entrusted by Parliament to make decisions about the allocation of resources in public interest. Applying legitimate expectation substantively allows the courts to inquire into the merits of the decision. Such interference with the public authority's discretion would be overstepping their role and exceeding their proper constitutional function.

On the other hand, in Coughlan the Court of Appeal cited the following passage from R. v. Inland Revenue Commissioners, ex parte MFK Underwriting Agents Ltd. (1990):

If a public authority so conducts itself as to create a legitimate expectation that a certain course will be followed it would often be unfair if the authority were permitted to follow a different course to the detriment of one who entertained the expectation, particularly if he acted on it. ... The doctrine of legitimate expectation is rooted in fairness.

The Court of Appeal emphasized that the approach taken in that case made no formal distinction between procedural and substantive unfairness. Substantive legitimate expectation does not intrude upon the executive's policy-making powers, as it is for public authorities, acting within their statutory powers, to adopt or change policies. The reasons for doing so are not usually open to judicial review. On the other hand, it is the job of the courts to determine whether an authority's application of a policy to an individual who has been led to expect something different is a just exercise of power.
