= Harrow Hill =

Harrow Hill may refer to:

- Harrow Hill, Gloucestershire
- Harrow Hill, West Sussex
- Harrow Hill F.C.
- Harrow on the Hill
- Harrowgate Hill
