= James Hayward Harlow =

American electrical engineer

James Hayward Harlow is an electrical engineer working for Harlow Engineering Associates in Mentone, Alabama. He was named a Fellow of the Institute of Electrical and Electronics Engineers (IEEE) in 2013 for his leadership in IEEE technical and standardization committees on transformer technology.
