= Carol Harlow =

British barrister and academic

Carol Harlow QC FBA is a British barrister and academic, emeritus professor of law at the London School of Economics (LSE). Her doctoral thesis was titled Administrative liability: a comparative study of French and English Law.

== Selected publications ==
- Law and administration, 3rd edn 2009
- Accountability in the European Union, 2000
- State liability: Tort Law and Beyond, 2002
- The Concepts and Methods of Reasoning of the New Public Law - A New Legislation?, 2011
- National administrative procedures in a European Perspective: Pathways to a slow convergence?, 2010
- Accountability as a Value in Global Governance and for Global Administrative Law, 2011
