= Bob Harlow =

Golf administrator

Bob Harlow (October 21, 1899 – November 15, 1954) was a figure in the development of professional golf in the United States.

== Early life and education ==
Harlow was born in Newburyport, Massachusetts.

== Career ==
He began his working life as a journalist, before becoming manager of Walter Hagen, then the biggest draw in golf, in 1921. In 1930, he was hired as tournament manager by the PGA of America and he played a key role in establishing a full-time PGA Tour. (The precise date this happened is a matter of interpretation, but money lists are available from 1934 onwards.) He was the first person to propose an idea to expand "The Circuit."

Harlow was a born salesman who went from city to city, convincing local clubs and businesses to support or start tournaments. He came up with ideas like having tournaments all year, having tournament volunteers, and having a PGA merchandise show. He kept the show on the road through the Great Depression. He also managed players such as Paul Runyan, Horton Smith and Ed Dudley. In 1936, he was replaced as tournament manager by Fred Corcoran as the PGA felt he had a conflict of interest, acting as agent for certain players while running a tour that was expected to treat all its members equally. He went on to found Golf World magazine in 1947, and was involved in other ventures, such as promoting professional tennis events. In 1988, he was inducted into the World Golf Hall of Fame.
