= Relevant and irrelevant considerations in Singapore administrative law =

The failure of a public authority to take into account relevant considerations and the taking of irrelevant ones into account are grounds of judicial review in Singapore administrative law. They are regarded as forms of illegality.

If, in the exercise of its discretion on a public duty, an authority takes into account considerations which the courts consider not to be proper, then in the eyes of the law it has not exercised its discretion legally. On the other hand, considerations that are relevant to a public authority's decision are of two kinds: there are mandatory relevant considerations (that is, considerations that the statute empowering the authority expressly or impliedly identifies as those that must be taken into account), and discretionary relevant considerations (those which the authority may take into account if it regards them as appropriate). If a decision-maker has determined that a particular consideration is relevant to its decision, it is entitled to attribute to it whatever weight it thinks fit, and the courts will not interfere unless it has acted in a Wednesbury-unreasonable manner. This is consistent with the principle that the courts are generally only concerned with the legality of decisions and not their merits.

In the United Kingdom, it has been suggested that if the court interprets a statute to impose a duty on a public authority, the resources available to the authority are irrelevant to deciding how the duty should be carried out. Conversely, if the court interprets a statute to confer a discretionary power on a public authority, then resources are a relevant consideration. Also, public authorities are not required to take into account people's fundamental rights arising under the Human Rights Act 1998 as relevant considerations before arriving at decisions. Their only responsibility is to ensure that the decision itself complies with the European Convention on Human Rights. At present, there are no Singapore cases on these issues.

== Introduction ==
Administrative law is the area of law concerning the control of powers exercised by the government. It functions to regulate decision-making processes by public authorities with regard to maintaining basic standards of fairness and legality. Administrative law in Singapore originates from and shares many similarities with administrative law in the United Kingdom. In general, claims for judicial review in administrative law fall under three broad categories – illegality, irrationality and procedural impropriety. Instances of illegality fall under two main headings: whether the authority was empowered to make the decision in question, and whether it properly exercised its discretion to make that decision. Grounds for illegality under the first heading include simple ultra vires, and errors as to precedent facts. The second heading includes grounds of judicial review such as making decisions on the basis of insufficient evidence or errors of material fact, failing to take into account relevant considerations and taking into account irrelevant ones, making decisions for improper purposes, fettering of discretion, and failing to fulfil legitimate expectations.

While a public authority may have fulfilled the legal and factual conditions required in order to properly exercise its statutory power, it may be deemed to have acted illegally if it makes its decision in a manner that contravenes administrative law rules. Under this category of judicial review, the courts' basic approach is to inquire if a decision-maker has taken into account all relevant considerations that it is required to take into account, and disregarded the irrelevant ones in making its decision. If it is satisfied that the decision-maker has done so, then the decision will stand, subject to other administrative law rules having been satisfied. The emphasis here is not on the body's decision itself, but on certain aspects of the reasoning process by which the decision was reached. Such an approach is consistent with the fundamental idea of judicial review that courts should not be concerned about the merits of a decision, but instead, only with its legality.

== Three categories of considerations ==
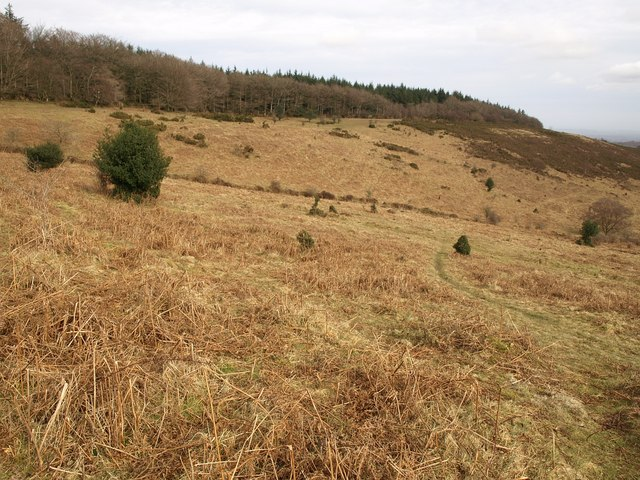
A common in Over Stowey, Somerset, England. In a 1995 judgment of the Court of Appeal of England and Wales concerning the legality of a ban on stag hunting imposed by Somerset County Council on land owned by the Council at another common called Over Stowey Customs Common, Lord Justice of Appeal Simon Brown identified three categories of considerations.

In the United Kingdom, the law on relevant and irrelevant considerations was explained in R. v. Somerset County Council, ex parte Fewings (1995). In this case, the applicants applied for judicial review of the legality of a ban on stag hunting on the basis that the Somerset County Council had taken into account an irrelevant consideration – the morality of stag hunting – when making its decision. In his dissenting judgment, Lord Justice of Appeal Simon Brown identified three categories of considerations that decision-makers need to be aware of:

- those clearly (whether expressly or impliedly) identified by the statute as considerations to which regard must be had;
- those clearly identified by the statute as considerations which must not be had; and
- those to which the decision-maker may have regard if in his judgment and discretion he thinks it right to do so.

Lord Justice Brown elaborated that for the third category, there is "a margin of appreciation within which the decision-maker may decide just what considerations should play a part in his reasoning process", subject to Wednesbury unreasonableness.

The Singapore case of City Developments Ltd. v. Chief Assessor (2008) illustrates a similar point. The Court of Appeal stated that "[w]here a wide range of considerations needs to be taken into account or a power is conferred on an authority exercisable on the authority's 'satisfaction', the courts are reluctant to intervene in the absence of bad faith or capriciousness". It was also said that "[w]hat is or is not a relevant consideration will depend on the statutory context."

== Taking into account irrelevant considerations ==
The decision of an administrative body is subject to judicial review if it took into account irrelevant considerations. If, in the exercise of its discretion on a public duty, the body takes into account considerations which the courts consider not to be proper, then in the eyes of the law it has not exercised its discretion legally.

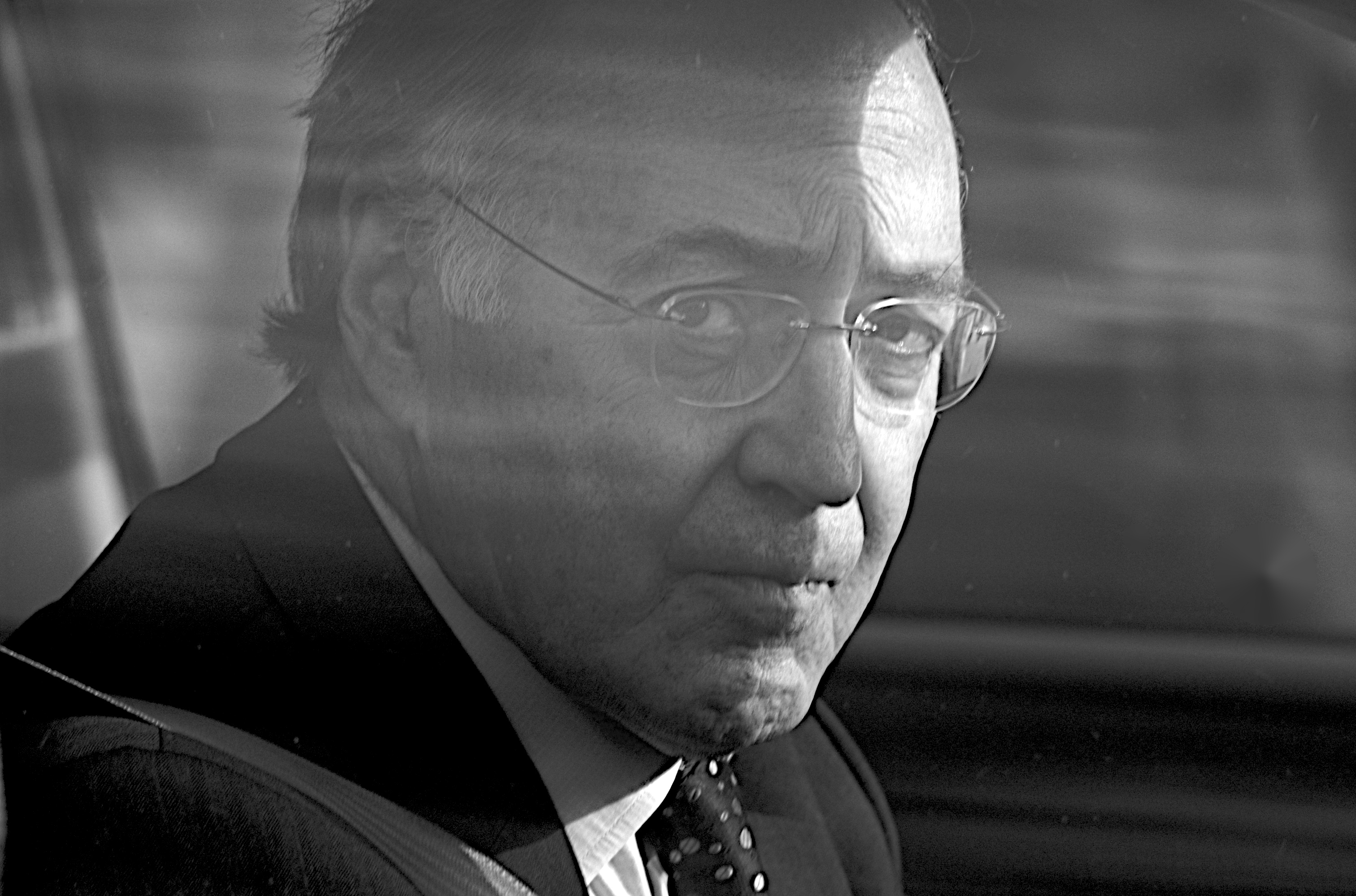
Michael Howard, the United Kingdom Home Secretary whom the House of Lords found had taken into account an irrelevant consideration when determining the period for which two young murderers should be detained at Her Majesty's pleasure

In the United Kingdom, a seminal case applying this principle is R. v. Secretary of State for the Home Department, ex parte Venables (1997). In this case, the Home Secretary had taken into account public opinion when deciding upon the tariff of 15 years for holding in custody two boys detained at Her Majesty's pleasure for having murdered James Bulger, a two-year-old child, when they were both ten years old. Lord Steyn held that the public petitions considered were worthless and incapable of informing the Home Secretary in a meaningful way of the true state of public opinion in respect of the tariff. Hence, the reliance on the public petition in coming up with its decision was an irrelevant consideration which justified the setting-aside of the Home Secretary's decision.

R. v. Ealing London Borough Council, ex parte Times Newspapers Ltd. (1986) dealt with the principle of irrelevant considerations as well. In this case, Ealing London Borough Council had refused to provide certain newspapers in their public libraries because the newspapers' proprietors were political rivals of members of the Council. The Divisional Court of England and Wales held that the political sentiments of the local authority should not have interfered with its decision to run the public libraries because it was irrelevant to its statutory duty to provide "a comprehensive and efficient library service for all persons desiring to make use thereof".

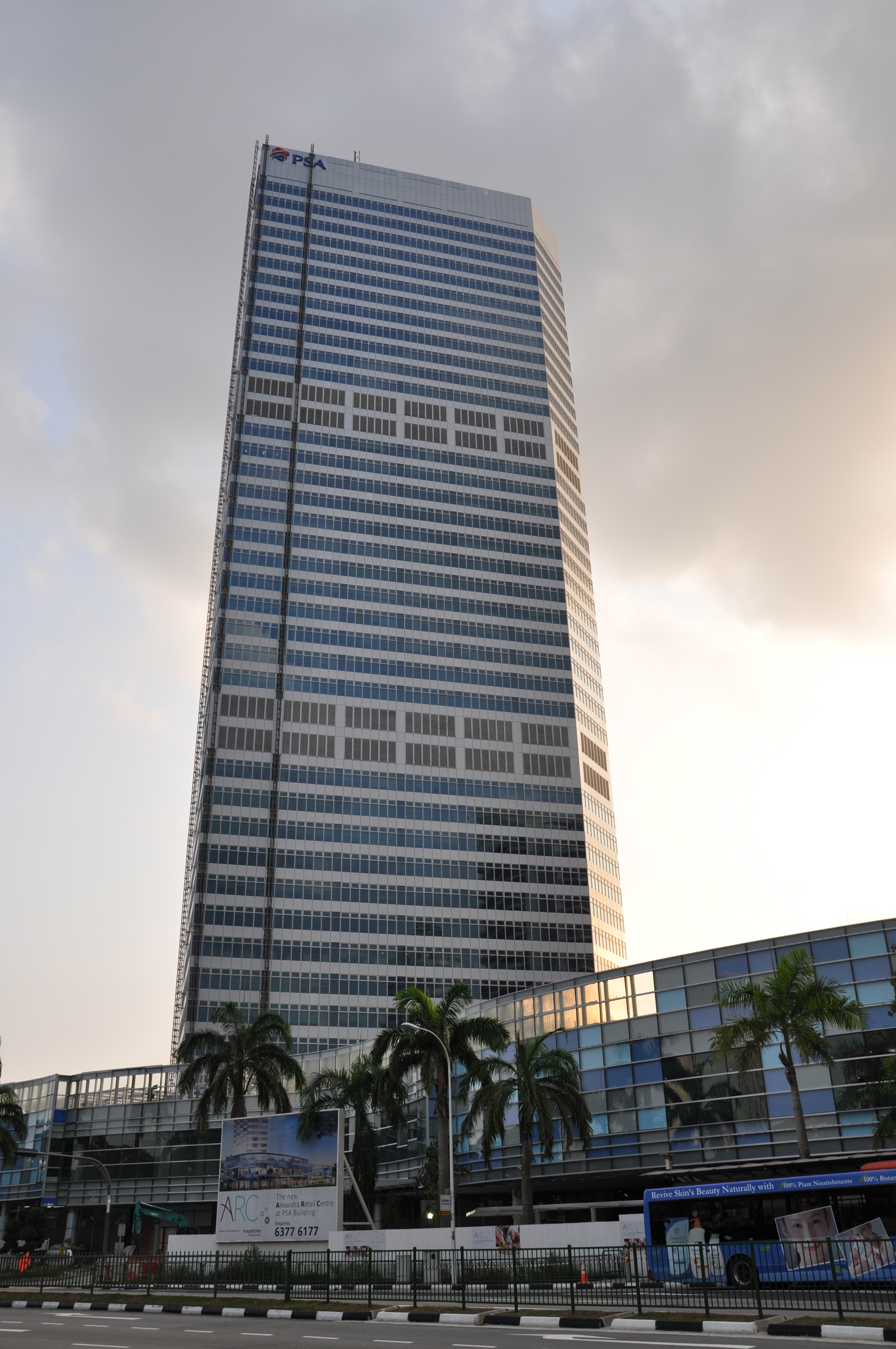
PSA Building, the current headquarters of PSA International. In a 1997 case it was claimed that the Port of Singapore Authority, PSA International's predecessor, had taken into account an irrelevant consideration when developing a policy concerning the allocation of berths at the Singapore Cruise Centre.

This legal principle has not been examined extensively in Singapore but it can be regarded to have been applied in Tan Gek Neo Jessie v. Minister for Finance (1991). The plaintiff was told by the Registrar of Businesses to change the name of her business "J. C. Penney Collections" to one which did not resemble the name "J. C. Penney". This was because the Registry of Trade Marks already had two trademarks registered with it with the name "Penneys" at that time. The proprietor of both the trademarks was J. C. Penney Company Inc., an American corporation. The Minister for Finance and the Registrar alleged that the plaintiff had used this business name to ride on the reputation of the American corporation by misleading Singaporeans into thinking that her business was associated with the American corporation. Both administrative bodies held that the mere resemblance of the names was proof of this. This was eventually held to be an irrelevant consideration as neither of the trademarks had been used by the American corporation to identify retail services in Singapore. Thus, it had no business reputation in Singapore in relation to the name "J. C. Penney". Furthermore, there was no evidence to suggest that the plaintiff, at the time of registering her business, was aware of the existence of the two registered trademarks. In arriving at the decisions to order the plaintiff to change her business name and to dismiss her appeal against that order, the Registrar and the Minister had respectively taken into account an irrelevant consideration. Ultimately, the court made an order of certiorari (now known as a quashing order) to quash both decisions.

Lines International Holding (S) Pte. Ltd. v. Singapore Tourist Promotion Board (1997) is another local case in which the principle of irrelevant considerations was raised. The Port of Singapore Authority (PSA), which was responsible for promoting the use, improvement and development of Singapore's ports, had introduced a policy of not allocating berths at the Singapore Cruise Centre to cruise ships unless over a three-month period 30% or fewer of the cruises in a cruise operator's schedule consisted of "cruises-to-nowhere". Such cruises, which left Singapore's territorial waters and returned to Singapore without calling at any other destination port, tended to be mainly for gambling purposes. The plaintiffs argued that in developing this policy, the PSA had assumed that gambling by Singaporeans in international waters was an unlawful activity. As there was no proper legal basis for this assumption, it was an irrelevant consideration which had seriously tainted the formulation of the policy. The High Court denied that this was the case, and found that the main consideration had been whether the development of the cruise industry would be impeded if Singapore gained an undesirable reputation as a hub for gambling cruises. The alleged irrelevant consideration had not been the substantial reason for the ultimate decision.

== Failing to take into account relevant considerations ==
As was indicated in the ex parte Fewings case, considerations that are relevant to a public authority's decision are of two kinds: there are mandatory relevant considerations (that is, considerations that the statute empowering the authority expressly or impliedly identifies as those that must be taken into account), and discretionary relevant considerations (those which the authority may take into account if it regards them as appropriate). Vasiliou v. Secretary of State for Transport (1991) is an example of a case in which a court found that a particular mandatory relevant consideration was to be implied into a statute. The Court of Appeal of England and Wales held that the Secretary of State for Transport had failed to take into account the fact that an order to close off a particular street for redevelopment would have caused the applicant a substantial loss of business.

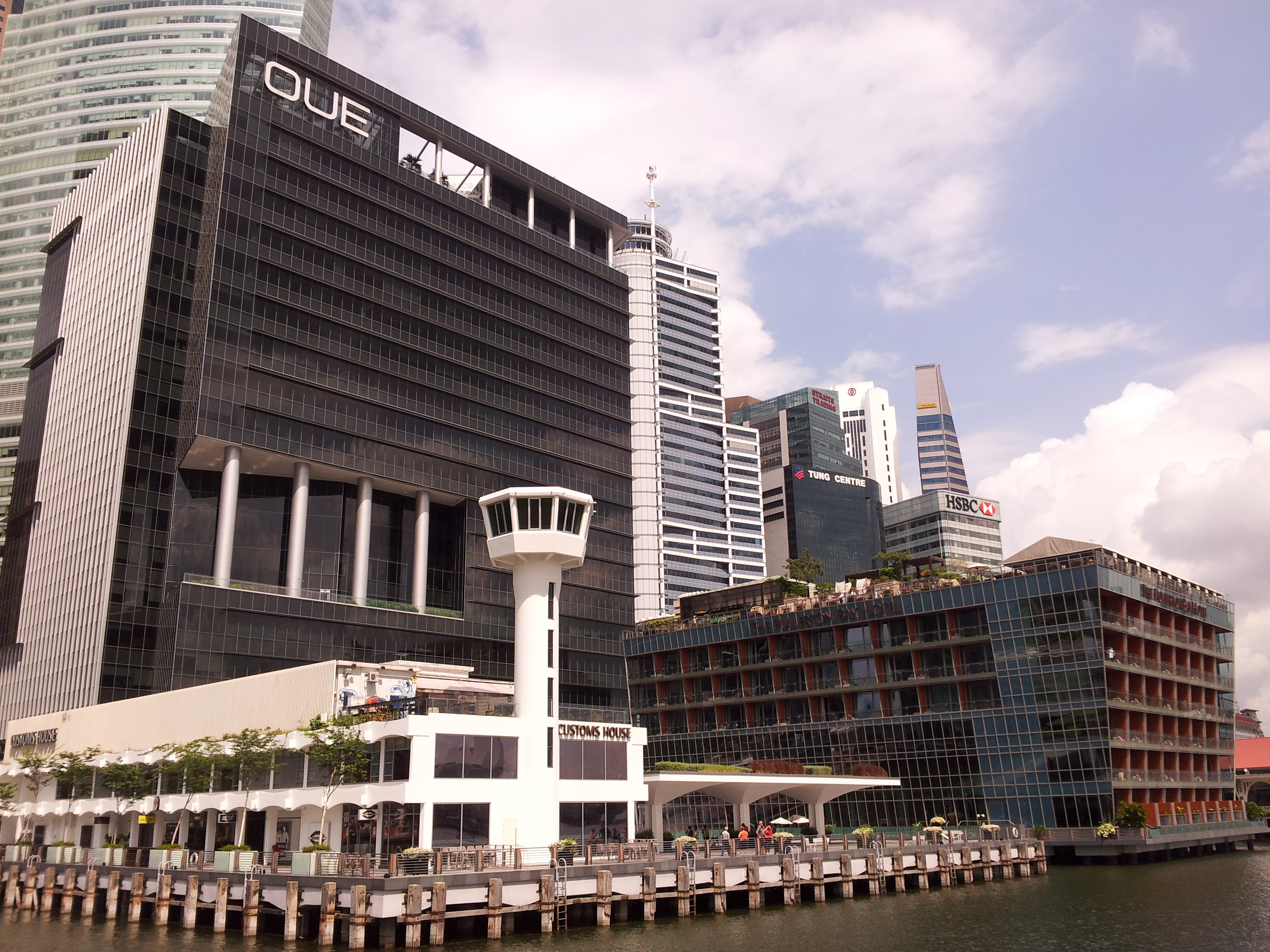
The old Customs House at Collyer Quay, Singapore. In a 1991 case the High Court found that the Director-General of Customs and Excise had failed to take into account relevant considerations when determining that import duty was payable by the applicant's company.

Re Fong Thin Choo (1991) was a Singapore case in which the applicant successfully proved that a public authority had failed to take into account relevant considerations. The Customs and Excise Department had not supervised the loading on to ships of cigarettes that the applicant's company intended to export from Singapore, and later discovered that some of these goods were not on the ships' manifests even though the company had declared that they were to be exported. Following an investigation, the Director-General of Customs and Excise ("DG") concluded that the goods had never been exported. Since the company was thus liable to pay import duty on the goods, the DG proceeded to recover the amount of duty from bankers' guarantees that had been lodged by the company with the Customs and Excise Department. The company sought leave to apply for an order of prohibition to prevent the Department from taking such action. Justice Chan Sek Keong quoted the following passage with approval:

[I]t is for a court of law to determine whether it has been established that in reaching his decision unfavourable to the council he had directed himself properly in law and had in consequence taken into consideration the matters which upon the true construction of the Act he ought to have considered and excluded from his consideration matters that were irrelevant to what he had to consider ...

He granted the application, holding that, among other things, the Department had failed to investigate fully the evidence produced by the company to show that the goods had been exported, leading to it fail to take into account relevant considerations.

Likewise, the case of Chew Kia Ngee v. Singapore Society of Accountants (1988) establishes the importance of taking into account relevant considerations. This case did not involve judicial review, but it elucidates the same principle. The disciplinary committee of the Singapore Society of Accountants suspended the appellant, an auditor, from practice for a period of five years after finding him guilty of an act or default discreditable to an accountant under section 33(1)(b) of the Accountants Act. The appellant, who was responsible for auditing a company's accounts, had pre-signed an incomplete form which was later submitted to the Monetary Authority of Singapore. The High Court held that the disciplinary committee had failed to take into account all the relevant considerations. In particular, the appellant had reviewed the form and had probably completed part of it. The disciplinary committee had apparently not considered this as they had concluded that the appellant had signed a form "in blank" in advance. The Court also stated that the committee would not have viewed his conduct as exhibiting the "callous attitude of an auditor towards his responsibility" had they considered the relevant factor. Consequently, the appeal was allowed, and the order of the committee was set aside.

=== Weight that should be accorded to considerations ===
When determining if a decision-maker has failed to take into account mandatory relevant considerations, the courts tend to inquire into the manner in which the decision-maker balances the considerations. This is evident from the case of Chew Kia Ngee where the High Court held that the Singapore Society of Accountants' disciplinary committee had given "undue emphasis" to the fact that the applicant had signed an incompletely filled form. Similarly, in Fong Thin Choo, the High Court stated that "undue weight" had been placed on certain documents as evidence that the applicant's company had not loaded some goods on to ships for export.

However, once the decision-maker has taken into account the relevant considerations, the courts are reluctant to scrutinize the manner in which the decision-maker balances the considerations. This can be gleaned from the case of R. v. Boundary Commission for England, ex parte Foot (1983), where the Court of Appeal of England and Wales was unwilling to overrule certain recommendations of the Commission as it had rightfully taken all the correct considerations laid down in the relevant statute. The Court emphasized that the weighing of those relevant considerations was a matter for the Commission, not the courts.

This statement of law was endorsed in Tesco Stores Ltd. v. Secretary of State for the Environment (1995), a planning law case. Lord Hoffmann discussed the "distinction between the question of whether something is a material consideration and the weight which it should be given. The former is a question of law and the latter is a question of planning judgment, which is entirely a matter for the planning authority". His Lordship stated:

[P]rovided that the planning authority has regard to all material considerations, it is at liberty (provided that it does not lapse into Wednesbury irrationality) to give them whatever weight the planning authority thinks fit or no weight at all.

=== Resources as relevant considerations ===
The availability, or lack thereof, of resources may constrain a public authority in the performance of its duties and exercise of its powers. The issue as to whether resources are a relevant consideration in the field of public service provision is said to be a "particularly difficult" one. Whether resources are a relevant consideration in each case depends on the wording of the relevant statutory provisions, and how the court reads the overall legislative scheme.

==== Resources held to be a relevant consideration ====
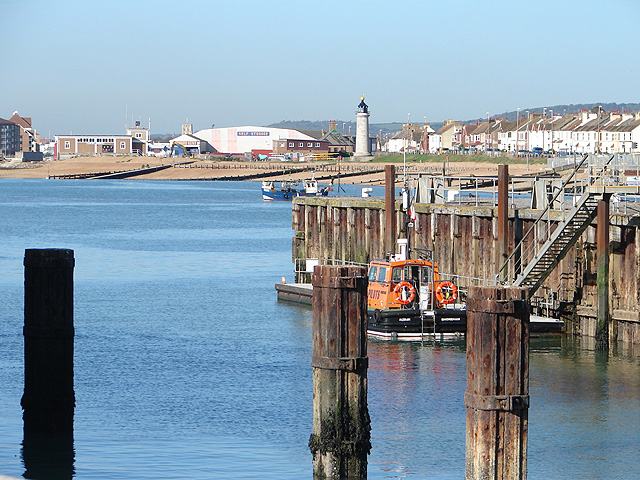
Shoreham Harbour, where in the 1990s a company called International Trader's Ferry transported livestock to the Continent. These shipments attracted protestors demonstrating against the trade, and the company took out judicial review proceedings against the Chief Constable of Sussex when he reduced the number of police officers keeping order at the harbour due to a lack of resources. In a 1999 judgment, the House of Lords held that the Chief Constable was entitled to take resources into account as a relevant consideration.

In R. v. Gloucestershire County Council, ex parte Barry (1997), a majority of the House of Lords held that the Gloucestershire County Council was allowed to take resources into consideration when deciding whether or not to withdraw the provision of home care services. Lord Nicholls stated: "A person's need for a particular type or level of service cannot be decided in a vacuum from which all considerations of cost have been expelled." This decision has been criticized for sending a signal to public authorities that the provision of public welfare services "can be constantly trimmed at the edges".

In R. (on the application of KM) v. Cambridgeshire County Council (2012), the Supreme Court of the United Kingdom declined to reconsider the case of Barry because any statement on the case would be merely an obiter dictum. However, Lady Hale suggested that Barry may have been "widely misunderstood". According to her, insofar as the majority in Barry had thought that resources should be a relevant consideration in assessing the needs of the disabled person, they may have fallen into error; nevertheless, a closer analysis of the decision in Barry suggests that "they did not fall into that error".

Other cases in which resources were held to be a relevant consideration include R. v. Norfolk County Council, ex parte Thorpe (1998), where a road authority was allowed to consider resources in deciding whether or not to build a footpath; R. v. Chief Constable of Sussex, ex parte International Trader's Ferry Ltd (1999), where a chief constable was permitted to consider resources in deciding how many police officers he should commit to an operation; and R. v. Barnet London Borough Council, ex parte G (FC) (2003), where a public authority was allowed to consider resources in deciding whether or not to provide accommodation for a child.

==== Resources held to be an irrelevant consideration ====
In R. v. East Sussex County Council, ex parte Tandy (1998), the House of Lords held that a local education authority was not entitled to consider available resources in performing its statutory duty to provide suitable education for a disabled child. Lord Browne-Wilkinson distinguished Barry, expressing concern that allowing the authority to take resources into consideration would be "to downgrade duties into what are, in effect, mere discretions over which the court would have very little real control". The case of Tandy was applied in R. v. Birmingham City Council, ex parte Mohammed (1998), in relation to the Housing Grants, Construction and Regeneration Act 1996.

In R. v. Sefton Metropolitan Borough Council, ex parte Help the Aged (1997), the Court of Appeal of England and Wales stated that even if an agency may consider resources in determining whether a person meets the criteria to receive provision of a service, it cannot then refuse to provide the service on the basis of insufficient resources.

==== Reconciling the cases ====
At present, there are no Singapore cases on the issue. In the United Kingdom context, it has been suggested that distinguishing between duties and discretionary powers may prove useful in reconciling the cases on whether resources are a relevant consideration. As Lord Nicholls stated in Ex parte G (FC), "[a] power need not be exercised, but a duty must be discharged". Thus, if the court interprets a statute to impose a duty on a public authority, resources are an irrelevant consideration. Conversely, if the court interprets a statute to confer a discretionary power on a public authority, then resources are a relevant consideration.

On distinguishing between duties and powers, Lord Nicholls explained that, generally, "the more specific and precise the duty the more readily the statute may be interpreted as imposing an obligation of an absolute character. Conversely, the broader and more general the terms of the duty, the more readily the statute may be construed as affording scope for a local authority to take into account matters such as cost when deciding how best to perform the duty in its own area."

=== Fundamental rights as relevant considerations ===
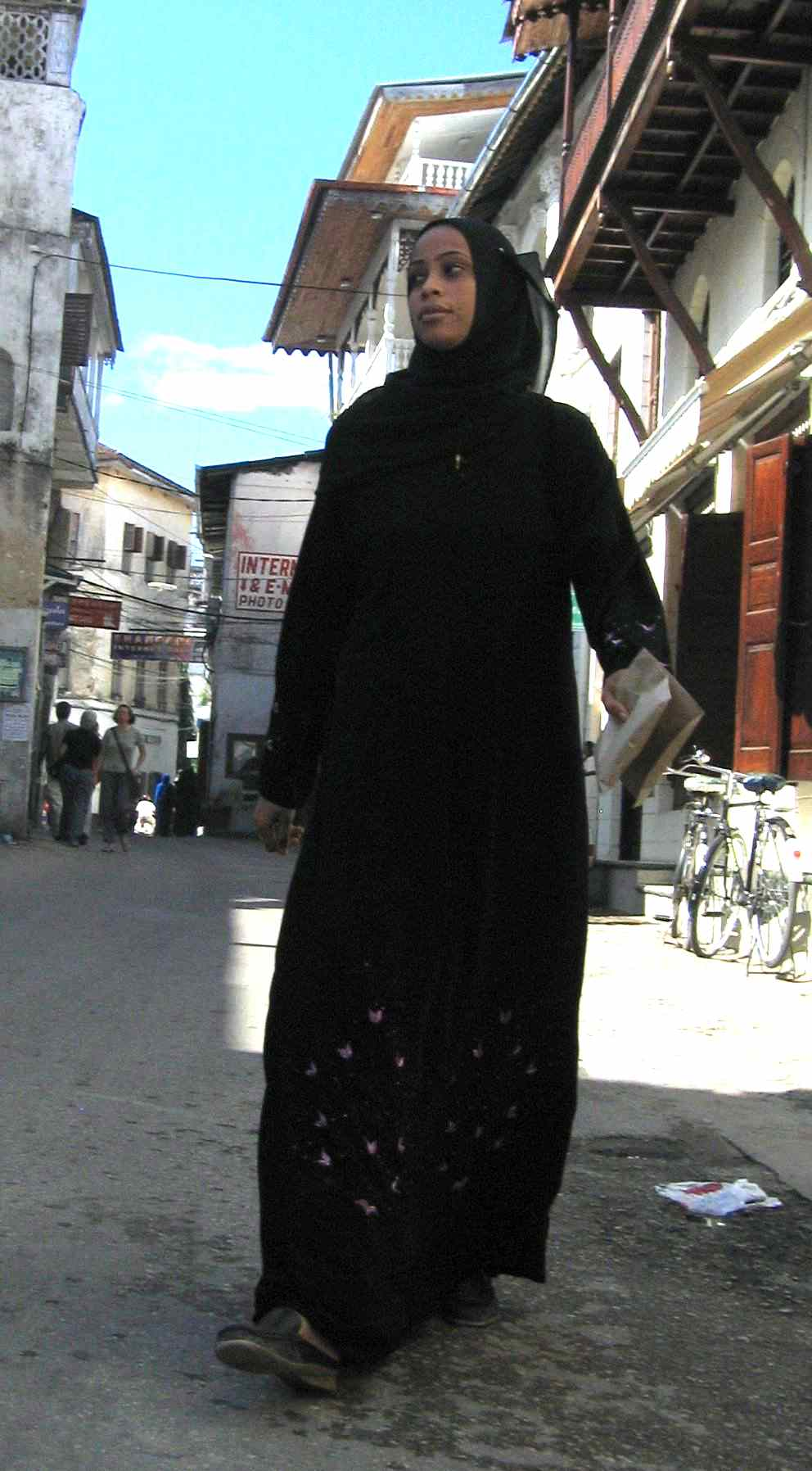
A woman wearing a jilbāb in Zanzibar. A British girl who wished to wear a similar form of dress to class sued her school when she was not allowed to do so. In a 2006 judgment, the House of Lords held that fundamental rights need not be taken into account as relevant considerations in a public authority's decision-making process, but that the decision itself must comply with rights.

In the United Kingdom, public authorities are not required to take into account people's fundamental rights arising under the Human Rights Act 1998 as relevant considerations before arriving at decisions. This was the conclusion of the House of Lords in R. (SB) v. Governors of Denbigh High School (2006), a case involving a Muslim schoolgirl who brought legal proceedings against Denbigh High School for disallowing her to wear a jilbāb to school, claiming among other things that her right to manifest her religion protected by Article 9 of the European Convention on Human Rights had been infringed. Lord Bingham of Cornhill, who delivered the lead judgment in the case, noted that the jurisprudence of the European Court of Human Rights did not focus on the defectiveness of the decision-making process, but only on whether the decision itself violated Convention rights. If the former approach were taken, this would introduce "a new formalism" and would be "a recipe for judicialisation on an unprecedented scale". It would place an undue burden on decision-makers such as school headteachers and governors to take human rights issues into account when reaching decisions, even if they had the assistance of solicitors. In his view, "what matters in any case is the practical outcome, not the quality of the decision-making process that led to it".

The courts in Singapore have not yet had to decide whether the fundamental liberties in the Constitution are relevant considerations in public authorities' decision-making processes. However, Singapore's government has constantly emphasized that it adheres to a traditional value system which places the interests of the community over and above that of the individual. Under this conception, social discipline, rather than rambunctious democracy and unbridled individualism, is lauded as necessary to secure economic growth and development imperatives. In Chee Siok Chin v. Minister for Home Affairs (2005), a case that concerned the constitutional right of freedom of speech, Justice V. K. Rajah stated that rights have limits:

Rights inevitably and invariably entail some responsibilities. ... In Singapore, Parliament has through legislation placed a premium on public order, accountability and personal responsibility ... Free speech is neither impaired nor impeded by ruling out [threatening, abusive and insulting speech] ... Disseminating false or inaccurate information or claims can harm and threaten public order.

He went on to say that freedom of action invariably ends where conflicting rights and/or interests collide. This quote underscores how the court perceives rights in accordance with the political ideology espoused by the government. This has resulted in decisions where little weight is placed on consideration of the individual's rights. An administrative law case which illustrates this is Chan Hiang Leng Colin v. Public Prosecutor (1994), the High Court upholding a total blanket ban on all publications by the publishing arm of the Jehovah's Witnesses under the Undesirable Publications Act. It explained that:

The fact that one publication is unobjectionable as to its contents, be it the King James Version or "Alice in Wonderland", does not make the ban unreasonable per se. ... The Minister's actions were clearly to stop the dissemination and propagation of beliefs of the Jehovah's Witnesses and ... [a]ny order other than a total blanket order would have been impossible to monitor administratively.

It has been argued that aside from manifesting insensitivity towards human rights concerns and hypersensitivity towards public order considerations, this approach ultimately reflects a judicial perception with a primary mandate of safeguarding executive goals rather than individual liberties. What the High Court in Chan Hiang Leng Colin could have done was to take into account various factors such as the number of Jehovah's Witnesses in Singapore and whether their forbearance from military service posed a genuine threat to public order such that it warranted the curtailment of the right to religious freedom under Article 15 of the Constitution.

== Overlaps between relevant and irrelevant considerations and other grounds of judicial review ==
The ground of failing to take into account relevant considerations and taking into account irrelevant ones may overlap with other grounds of judicial review such as deciding for an improper purpose and irrationality. For example, in Lines International, the High Court considered the ground of relevant and irrelevant considerations together with Wednesbury unreasonableness.

Conceptually, taking an irrelevant consideration into account in a decision may be equivalent to deciding for an improper purpose. In Hanks v. Minister of Housing and Local Government (1962), the overlap was thought to be so pronounced as to merit a suggestion that improper purpose should be subsumed under the heading of relevant and irrelevant considerations. However, this suggestion has not yet been taken up, and the two grounds remain separate from each other.

In addition, it has been suggested that a substantive legitimate expectation may be a relevant consideration, as the Court of Appeal of England and Wales held in the case of R. (Bibi) v. Newham London Borough Council (2001).
