= Remedies in Singapore administrative law =

Types of legal orders applicable on Singapore Government's executive branch

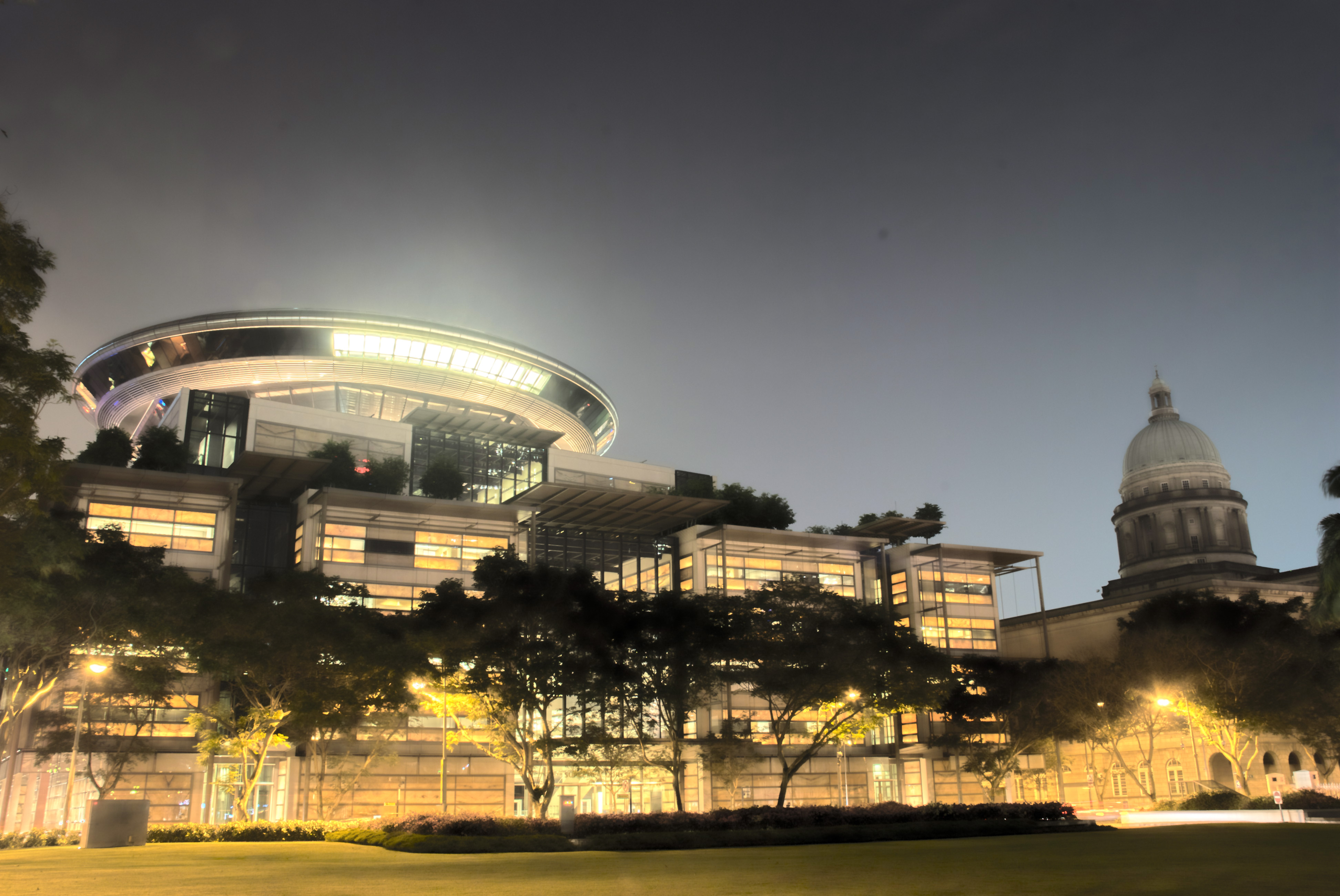
A night view of the Supreme Court of Singapore. Applications for judicial review of administrative actions, in which prerogative orders may be sought, are made to the High Court which is housed in this building.

The remedies available in Singapore administrative law are the prerogative orders – the mandatory order (formerly known as mandamus), prohibiting order (prohibition), quashing order (certiorari), and order for review of detention (habeas corpus) – and the declaration, a form of equitable remedy. In Singapore, administrative law is the branch of law that enables a person to challenge an exercise of power by the executive branch of the Government. The challenge is carried out by applying to the High Court for judicial review. The Court's power to review a law or an official act of a government official is part of its supervisory jurisdiction, and at its fullest may involve quashing an action or decision and ordering that it be redone or remade.

A mandatory order is an order of the High Court commanding a public authority to perform a public duty, while a prohibiting order operates to prevent illegal action by an authority from occurring in the first place. A quashing order, the most commonly sought prerogative order, has the effect of invalidating an ultra vires decision made by an authority. Obtaining a mandatory, prohibiting or quashing order is a two-stage process, as an applicant must be granted leave by the Court to apply for the order. The Court must find the existence of a proper public law issue and available grounds of review. Leave will be granted provided that an arguable and prima facie case of reasonable suspicion that the authority has acted in breach of administrative law rules is established.

An order for review of detention directs someone holding a person in detention to produce the detainee before the High Court so that the legality of the detention can be established. The power of the Court to require that this be done is specifically mentioned in Article 9(2) of the Constitution of Singapore. While the other prerogative orders may only be applied for with the court's permission, an order for review of detention may be applied for without prior permission from the court.

A declaration is a pronouncement by a court stating the legal position between the parties to an action, based on the facts that have been presented to the court. Before 1 May 2011, it was not possible to apply for prerogative orders and declarations in the same set of legal proceedings. Following that date, changes to Order 53 of the Rules of Court permitted an application for a declaration to be made together with an application for one or more prerogative orders. However, the application for a declaration cannot be made unless the court grants leave for the prerogative orders to be applied for.

The Government Proceedings Act bars the High Court from granting injunctions against the Government or one of its officers. An injunction is an equitable private law remedy that restrains a public authority from doing an act that is wrongful or ultra vires. In place of an injunction, the Court may make a declaration concerning the parties' rights. At common law, there is no general right to claim damages – that is, monetary compensation – if rules of public law have been breached by an authority. In order to obtain damages, an aggrieved person must be able to establish a private law claim in contract or tort law.

== Introduction ==
=== Supervisory jurisdiction of the High Court ===
The aim of administrative law is to regulate the executive government by providing remedies which individuals can apply for when challenging administrative actions and decisions, and failures to take action and make decisions. Where the exercise of statutory or other discretionary power by public authorities contravenes the Constitution or is unlawful under administrative law, various remedies may be available when a judicial review action is taken.

Judicial review, the means by which the High Court controls the exercise of legislative and executive power, is part of the Court's supervisory jurisdiction. The basis of this jurisdiction was affirmed by the Court of Appeal in Ng Chye Huey v. Public Prosecutor (2007) as inherent in nature, that is, deriving from the common law rather than statute. The Court noted that this jurisdiction had "existed historically at common law" and "is still very much a part of our judicial system". The inherent power of the High Court to review the decisions of inferior courts and other administrative bodies does not, however, extend to co-ordinate bodies. In other words, one High Court judge may not exercise judicial review over a decision by another High Court judge. In addition, there are no provisions in the Supreme Court of Judicature Act which confer on the Court of Appeal the power to exercise supervisory jurisdiction over the High Court or – as pointed out in Ng Chye Huey – the Subordinate Courts.

The effective scope of the principles of judicial review depends on how the Court chooses to exercise its discretion in pursuance of its supervisory jurisdiction.

=== Remedies ===
The remedies available in a judicial review action are the prerogative orders – the mandatory order (formerly known as mandamus), prohibiting order (prohibition), quashing order (certiorari), and order for review of detention (habeas corpus) – and the declaration, a form of equitable remedy. All these remedies that the High Court may grant are discretionary. A successful claimant has no absolute right to a remedy. In deciding whether to grant a remedy, the Court will take into account factors such as the following:

- any prejudicial delay by the claimant in bringing the case;
- whether the claimant has suffered substantial hardship;
- any impact the remedy may have on third parties;
- whether a remedy will have any practical effect, or whether the matter has become academic (in which case a remedy will usually not be granted);
- the merits of the case; and
- whether the remedy will promote good administration.

== Prerogative orders ==
The ancient remedies of certiorari, mandamus, prohibition and habeas corpus were originally only available to the British Crown and thus termed prerogative writs, that is, writs that could be issued at the prerogative of the sovereign. By the end of the 16th century, they could theoretically be sought by any aggrieved citizen. In 1938, the writs were abolished in the United Kingdom and replaced by prerogative orders with essentially the same names and functions. As a former British colony, Singapore inherited English administrative law at independence and the Singapore courts continue to pay close attention to English cases. In Singapore, the prerogative orders were known by their traditional names until 2006, when the names were modernised.

Following the change, paragraph 1 of the First Schedule to the Supreme Court of Judicature Act, which is entitled "Prerogative orders", now states that the High Court possesses the following power:

Power to issue to any person or authority any direction, order or writ for the enforcement of any right conferred by any written law or for any other purpose, including the following prerogative orders:

(a) a Mandatory Order (formerly known as mandamus);
(b) a Prohibiting Order (formerly known as a prohibition);
(c) a Quashing Order (formerly known as certiorari); and
(d) an Order for Review of Detention (formerly known as a writ of habeas corpus).

The Subordinate Courts are not empowered to grant prerogative orders.

The amendment of the provision removed a specific reference to the High Court's power to issue writs of quo warranto, a remedy used to challenge a person's right to hold public office. There are no reported cases of quo warranto having been issued in Singapore. Since paragraph 1 still empowers the High Court "to issue to any person or authority any ... order or writ for the enforcement of any right conferred by any written law or for any other purpose", it may be that the Court's power to issue an order equivalent to a quo warranto has not been impaired.

=== Mandatory orders ===
A mandatory order is an order of the High Court which commands a public body to perform a public duty, and is usually employed to compel public bodies to exercise the powers given to them. It may be used in combination with another remedy, most commonly a quashing order. In such a case, the quashing order will set aside the unlawful decision, and the mandatory order will require the public body to reconsider the matter. A person who complies with a mandatory order cannot have legal proceedings taken against him or her for doing so.

Since it is the responsibility of the High Court to determine the legality of a decision rather than its merits, it will not order a public body to take a certain course of action, but will merely enjoin it to perform its duty in a lawful manner. In R. v. Justices of Kingston, ex parte Davey (1902), it was held:

[T]his court does not by mandamus direct justices or any public body or anybody else upon whom a duty is cast, how and in what manner they are to perform their duty. They simply direct them by mandamus to perform their duty. I think also that even where the facts are all admitted, so that in the particular circumstances of a particular case – as my brother has pointed out in this case – there happens to be but one way of performing that duty, still the mandamus goes to perform the duty, and not to perform it in a particular way.

In Re San Development Co's Application (1971), the applicant sought certiorari to quash the decision of a Commissioner of Appeals of an Appeals Board under the Land Acquisition Act 1966 refusing to allow the applicant to proceed with an appeal against an award made by the Collector of Land Revenue as the notice of appeal had been filed late, and a mandamus directing the Commissioner to hear the appeal. Relying on the above case, the High Court held that it could not grant a mandamus in such terms. Instead, it quashed the Commissioner's decision and issued a mandamus directing him to "consider and determine the application of the applicants according to law". Similarly, in Borissik v. Urban Redevelopment Authority (2009), the High Court held that the applicant should not have asked for a mandatory order requiring the Urban Redevelopment Authority to unconditionally approve the redevelopment plan for her property that she sought, and for a processing fee she had paid to be refunded.

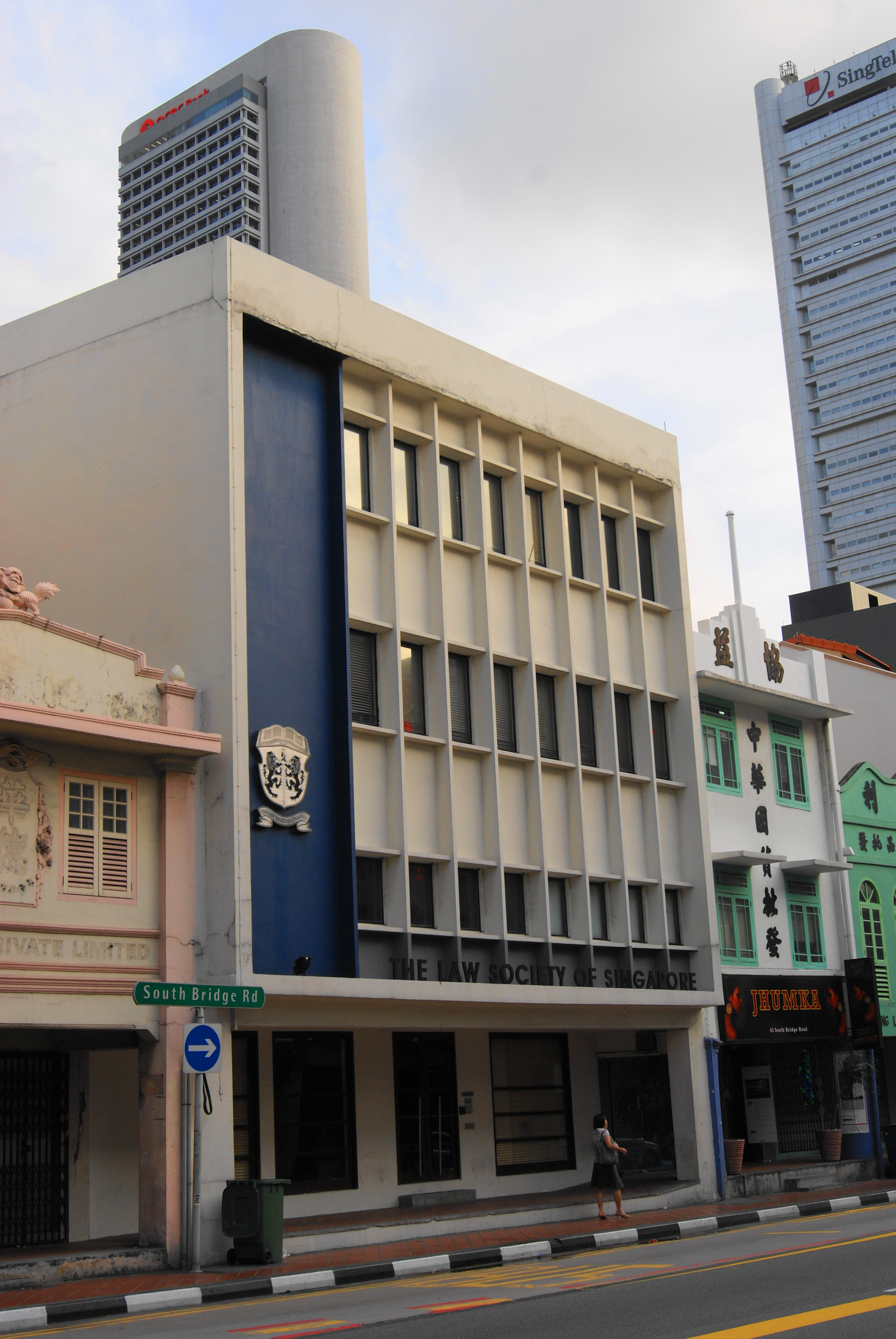
The headquarters of the Law Society of Singapore along South Bridge Road, photographed in January 2012. In 1985, the High Court granted a mandamus (now known as a mandatory order) to the Society to compel a Disciplinary Committee to investigate charges of wrongdoing against an advocate and solicitor.

Re Lim Chor Pee, ex parte Law Society of Singapore (1985) is another example of a case where a mandatory order was granted by the High Court. The appellant, Lim Chor Pee, who was an advocate and solicitor, had been convicted of several income tax offences and had been found to have tampered with a witness. On 16 July 1982, the Attorney-General wrote to the President of the Law Society of Singapore, providing information on the appellant's conviction and other records. Following a report by the Society's Inquiry Committee that a formal inquiry into the appellant's conduct was necessary, a Disciplinary Committee was appointed. The appellant successfully applied to the Disciplinary Committee to delete certain paragraphs of the statement of case which had been formulated against him by the Council of the Law Society, on the ground that the facts in those paragraphs did not appear in the Inquiry Committee's report. Consequently, three of the six charges against the appellant and a major portion of one other charge did not require investigation by the Disciplinary Committee. Dissatisfied with this decision, the Law Society applied to the High Court for an order of mandamus to direct the Disciplinary Committee to hear and investigate all the six charges against the appellant. The High Court granted the application, holding that under the Legal Profession Act, the Inquiry Committee's only function was to consider the matters before it and decide whether or not there should be a formal investigation by a Disciplinary Committee. It was the duty of the Council of the Law Society to draw up the charges, and the duty of the Disciplinary Committee to hear and investigate the charges properly before the Committee in the statement of case. Thus, the appellant could not object that some of the charges against him were based on facts not mentioned in the Inquiry Committee's report. The decision was affirmed by the Court of Appeal.

One of the issues before the Court of Appeal in Lim Chor Pee was whether the Law Society had standing (locus standi) to apply for mandamus against the Disciplinary Committee. The Court cited R. v. Inland Revenue Commissioners, ex parte National Federation of Self Employed and Small Businesses Ltd. (1981), in which the House of Lords noted that although the law had formerly required an applicant to show that he or she "has a legal specific right to ask for the interference of the Court" to obtain a mandamus, this was no longer correct and that the courts had moved to a sufficient interest standard. The Court then went on to find that the Law Society had sufficient interest to apply for mandamus as under the Legal Profession Act one of its purposes was "to maintain and impose the standards of conduct ... of the legal profession in Singapore", and the Council of the Society was empowered by the Act to formulate charges against advocates and solicitors whom the Inquiry Committee felt should be formally investigated.

=== Prohibiting orders ===
A prohibiting order operates to prevent illegal action by a public authority from occurring in the first place. It may be granted by the High Court in cases where the applicant is aware that the authority is about to take an unlawful course of action, or to prevent the authority from repeating an unlawful act. Like a quashing order, a prohibiting order is used to help maintain good standards of public administration.

R. v. Kent Police Authority, ex parte Godden (1972) is an instance of a United Kingdom case in which an order of prohibition was issued to avert action that would not have complied with administrative law rules. In July 1970, Godden, a police chief inspector of Kent Police Authority, was examined by the police authority's chief medical officer, who took the view that he was suffering from a mental disorder and thus unfit for duty. Godden was therefore placed on sick leave, although his own specialist found that he did not have any psychiatric illness. Subsequently, in January 1971, the police authority informed him that it would be appointing the chief medical officer to assess if he was permanently disabled, for the purpose of determining if he should be compulsorily retired. The Court of Appeal of England and Wales found that since the medical officer had previously formed the opinion that Godden was mentally disordered, he could not be impartial when assessing if Godden was permanently disabled. Thus, an order of prohibition should be issued to prohibit him from carrying out this assessment.

In the Singapore case Re Fong Thin Choo (1991), a company had removed a large quantity of cigarettes from a warehouse, ostensibly for loading on board a vessel to be exported. However, the alleged loading had not been supervised by the Customs and Excise Department. The Director-General of Customs and Excise subsequently concluded that the goods had never been exported, and requested that the company pay import duty of $130,241.30 on them. The company applied for an order of prohibition to bar the Director-General from proceeding to recover a sum of $130,241.30 by deducting it from several bankers' guarantees that had been lodged with Customs as security. As regards whether an order of prohibition could be obtained against the Director-General, the High Court said:

Prohibition will issue against any inferior court, tribunal or public authority to carry out any order or decision which is invalid under the law as being in excess of its authority to make. The principles applicable to certiorari to quash such an order or decision are equally applicable to prohibition. The law in this field has reached the stage where the test as to amenability to prohibition is whether the tribunal concerned is exercising a public duty.

As the Director-General was a public officer appointed by statute to discharge public duties, he was subject to an order of prohibition in an appropriate case. The Court found that on the affidavit evidence produced by the applicants, the Director-General could not reasonably have come to the conclusion he came to without hearing the applicants' witnesses. He had thus misdirected himself on the law as to the nature of the evidence that was required to be produced to prove the export of the goods. Finally, there had been an insufficient inquiry which had resulted in a failure to take into account relevant considerations, and an investigation that was unfair to the applicant. The Court therefore made an order of prohibition against the Director-General to prevent him from deducting money from the bankers' guarantees.

A person seeking to obtain a prohibiting order must demonstrate that he or she has a sufficient interest to do so. In Chan Hiang Leng Colin v. Minister for Information and the Arts (1995), the High Court cited the following passage from Sir William Wade's Administrative Law (4th ed., 1977):

One of the valuable features of the "public" character of certiorari and prohibition, already emphasized, is that they may be awarded to a member of the public without any special personal right. In other words, there is no restrictive requirement of standing on the part of an applicant. ... Consequently the court is prepared to act at the instance of a mere stranger, though it retains discretion to refuse to do so if it considers that no good would be done to the public. Every citizen has standing to invite the court to prevent some abuse of power, and in doing so he may claim to be regarded not as a meddlesome busybody but as a public benefactor.

When the case was appealed, the sufficient interest test was upheld by the Court of Appeal.

=== Quashing orders ===
The effect of a quashing order is to invalidate an ultra vires decision made by a public body, usually acting under some statutory authority. It is the most commonly sought of the prerogative orders in judicial review proceedings.

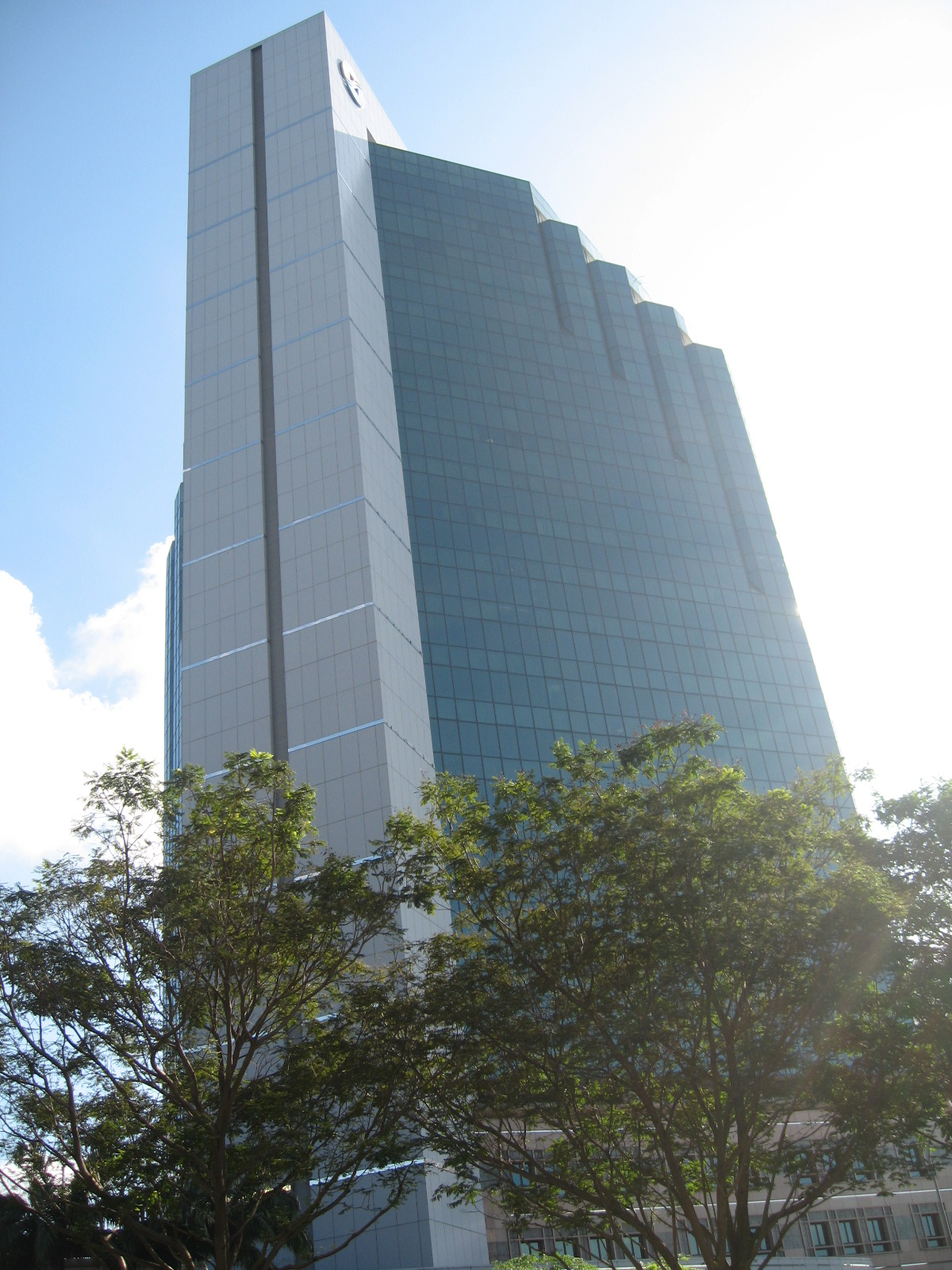
Revenue House, the headquarters of the Inland Revenue Authority of Singapore (IRAS), photographed in May 2006. In a 2010 case, the Court of Appeal held that a letter containing a determination by the Comptroller of Income Tax that a company was subject to withholding tax amounted only to advice, and so technically the Comptroller had taken no legal action that could be subject to a quashing order.

Quashing orders may only be obtained against decisions which have some direct or indirect actual or ostensible legal effect, and not against mere opinions. In Comptroller of Income Tax v. ACC (2010), the respondent, a locally incorporated company, had arranged to enter into interest rate swap agreements with Singapore banks or Singapore branches of foreign banks on behalf of its offshore subsidiaries. The Comptroller of Income Tax took the position that payments made by the respondent to its subsidiaries pursuant to those swap agreements fell within the ambit of section 12(6) of the Income Tax Act, such that the withholding tax requirements imposed by section 45 of the same statute applied. As the respondent had not complied with the relevant withholding tax requirements with respect to the payments in question, the respondent was required to account to the Comptroller for the amount of tax which should have been withheld. This was conveyed to the respondent in a letter. The respondent sought leave to apply to quash the determination by the Comptroller. The Court of Appeal held that the Comptroller's letter was no more than advice to the respondent, and did not amount to a legal determination that withholding tax was due from the respondent. Thus, technically speaking, there was no determination to quash and the respondent should have applied for a declaration instead. However, since the parties had accepted a ruling by the High Court that the Comptroller's letter did amount to a legal determination of the respondent's tax liability and the Comptroller had not questioned this aspect of the High Court's judgment, the Court of Appeal proceeded on the basis that the letter did contain a determination that was judicially reviewable. It said that, "given the particular circumstances of this case, for the court to require the respondent to recommence proceedings for a declaratory judgment would be to take an overly legalistic view of what procedural justice requires".

As mentioned above in relation to prohibiting orders, the test for standing to apply for a quashing order is that of sufficient interest in the matter. The High Court in Chan Hiang Leng Colin held that to have standing for certiorari, "[i]t was not necessary that the applicant had to have a particular grievance arising out of the order complained about. It was sufficient that there had been an abuse of power which inconvenienced someone." In support of this rule, it cited Lord Denning, the Master of the Rolls, in R. v. Greater London Council, ex parte Blackburn (1976):

I regard it as a matter of high constitutional principle that if there is good ground for supposing that a government department or a public authority is transgressing the law, or is about to transgress it, in a way which offends or injures thousands of Her Majesty's subjects, then anyone of those offended or injured can draw it to the attention of the courts of law and seek to have the law enforced and the courts in their discretion can grant whatever remedy is appropriate.

This passage was also approved by the Court of Appeal in Chan Hiang Leng Colin.

=== Orders for review of detention ===
An order for review of detention directs someone holding a person in detention to produce the detainee before the High Court so that the legality of the detention can be established. In Re Onkar Shrian (1969), the High Court held:

[T]he writ [of habeas corpus] is a prerogative process of securing the liberty of the subject by affording an effective means of immediate release from unlawful or unjustifiable detention, whether in prison or in private custody. By it the High Court and the judges of that court, at the instance of a subject aggrieved, command the production of that subject, and inquire into the cause of his imprisonment. If there is no legal justification for the detention, the party is ordered to be released.

The power of the Court to require that this be done is specifically mentioned in Article 9(2) of the Constitution of Singapore, which states: "Where a complaint is made to the High Court or any Judge thereof that a person is being unlawfully detained, the Court shall inquire into the complaint and, unless satisfied that the detention is lawful, shall order him to be produced before the Court and release him."

In Chng Suan Tze v. Minister for Home Affairs (1988), the appellants had been detained without trial under section 8(1) of the Internal Security Act ("ISA") for alleged involvement in a Marxist conspiracy to subvert and destabilise the country. The detention orders were subsequently suspended under section 10 of the Act, but the suspensions were revoked following the release of a press statement by the appellants in which they denied being Marxist conspirators. Having applied unsuccessfully to the High Court for writs of habeas corpus to be issued, the appellants appealed against the ruling. The Court of Appeal allowed the appeal on the narrow ground that the Government had not adduced sufficient evidence to discharge its burden of proving the President was satisfied that the appellants' detention was necessary to prevent them from endangering, among other things, Singapore's security or public order, which was required by section 8(1) of the ISA before the Minister for Home Affairs could make detention orders against them. However, in a lengthy obiter discussion, the Court held that an objective rather than a subjective test should apply to the exercise of discretion by the authorities under sections 8 and 10 of the ISA. In other words, the executive could not insist that the exercise of the discretion was unchallengeable. The exercise of discretion could be reviewed by the court, and the executive had to satisfy the court that there were objective facts justifying its decision.

In the course of its judgment, the Court of Appeal noted that at common law if the return to a writ of habeas corpus – the response to the writ that a person holding a detainee had to give – was valid on its face, the court could not inquire further into the matter. However, section 3 of the UK Habeas Corpus Act 1816 broadened the court's power by entitling it to examine the correctness of the facts mentioned in the return. The section stated, in part:

Judges to inquire into the Truth of Facts contained in Return. Judge to bail on Recognizance to appear in Term, &c. In all cases provided for by this Act, although the return to any writ of habeas corpus shall be good and sufficient in law, it shall be lawful for the justice or baron, before whom such writ may be returnable, to proceed to examine into the truth of the facts set forth in such return by affidavit ...; and to do therein as to justice shall appertain ...

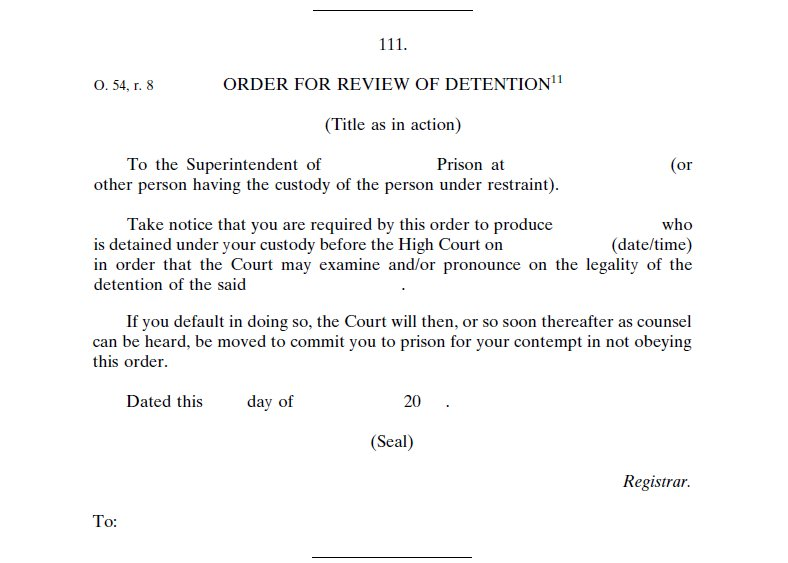
Form 111 of the Rules of Court (Cap. 322, R 5, 2006 Rev. Ed.), the format for an order for review of detention

Section 3 of the Act thus "contemplates the possibility of an investigation by the court so that it may satisfy itself where the truth lies". The extent of the investigation depends on whether a public authority's exercise of the power to detain rests on the existence or absence of certain jurisdictional or precedent facts. If so, the court must assess if the authority has correctly established the existence or otherwise of these facts. However, if the power to detain is not contingent on precedent facts, the court's task is only to determine whether there exists evidence upon which the authority could reasonably have acted.

The UK Habeas Corpus Act 1816 applied to Singapore by virtue of the Second Charter of Justice 1826, which is generally accepted to have made all English statutes and principles of English common law and equity in force as at 27 November 1826 applicable in the Straits Settlements (including Singapore), unless they were unsuitable to local conditions and could not be modified to avoid causing injustice or oppression. In 1994, after Chng Suan Sze was decided, the Application of English Law Act was enacted with the effect that only English statutes specified in the First Schedule of the Act continued to apply in Singapore after 12 November 1993. The Habeas Corpus Act 1816 is not one of these statutes, and so appears to have ceased to be part of Singapore law. Nonetheless, it may be argued that High Court should continue to apply a rule equivalent to section 3 of the Act to orders for review of detention because of the combined effect of Article 9(2) of the Constitution which should not be regarded as having been abridged unless the legislature has used clear and unequivocal language, and the following principle from Eshugbayi Eleko v. Government of Nigeria (1931) stated by Lord Atkin:

In accordance with British jurisprudence no member of the executive can interfere with the liberty or property of a British subject except on the condition that he can support the legality of his action before a court of justice. And it is the tradition of British justice that judges should not shrink from deciding such issues in the face of the executive.

Since an order for review of detention is a remedy for establishing the legality of detention, it may not be used to challenge the conditions under which a person is held, if the detention itself is lawful. Moreover, an order can only be sought where a person is being physically detained, and not if he or she is merely under some other form of restriction such as being out on bail.

Both nationals and non-nationals of a jurisdiction may apply for orders for review of detention. In the UK context, Lord Scarman disagreed with the suggestion that habeas corpus protection only extends to British nationals, stating in Khera v. Secretary of State for the Home Department; Khawaja v. Secretary of State for the Home Department ("Khawaja", 1983), that "[e]very person within the jurisdiction enjoys the equal protection of our laws. There is no distinction between British nationals and others. He who is subject to English law is entitled to its protection."

=== Procedure for prerogative orders ===
According to the Government Proceedings Act, civil proceedings against the Government must be commenced against an appropriate authorised Government department. If there is no appropriate authorised Government department, or the person wishing to commence proceedings has reasonable doubt as to which department (if any) is appropriate, proceedings should be commenced against the Attorney-General. This rule applies to judicial review proceedings in which prerogative orders or declarations are sought.

The minister charged with responsibility for the Act is required to publish in the Government Gazette a list stating the Government departments which are authorised departments for the purposes of the Act, and the names and addresses for service of the solicitors for the departments. As of 7 December 2005, no such list had been published. For this reason, in Chee Siok Chin v. Minister for Home Affairs (2005), decided on that date, the High Court held that instead of instituting the action against the Minister for Home Affairs and the Commissioner of Police, the applicants should have done so against the Attorney-General. Nonetheless, the suit should not be dismissed as this was a procedural irregularity that could be cured by substituting the Attorney-General as the respondent.

==== Mandatory, prohibiting and quashing orders ====
If a mandatory order, prohibiting order or quashing order is sought, the applicant must follow the procedure set out in Order 53 of the Rules of Court. In general, there are two stages. At the first stage, an applicant must obtain leave to apply for the prerogative order. This requirement prevents unmeritorious applications from being taken against decision-makers by filtering out groundless cases at an early stage to prevent wastage of judicial time, and protects public bodies from harassment, intentional or otherwise. An application for such leave must be made by ex parte originating summons and must be supported by a statement setting out the name and description of the applicant, the relief sought and the grounds on which it is sought; and by an affidavit, to be filed when the application is made, verifying the facts relied on. In granting leave, the judge hearing the application for leave may impose such terms as to costs and as to security as he or she thinks fit.

In addition, there is a time requirement which stipulates that leave shall not be granted to apply for a quashing order to remove any judgment, order, conviction or other proceeding for the purpose of its being quashed, unless the application for leave is made within three months after the date of the proceeding or such other period (if any) as may be prescribed by any written law. However, the High Court may allow an application for leave to be filed out of time if the delay "is accounted for to the satisfaction of the Judge", as was the case in Chai Chwan v. Singapore Medical Council (2009). No such time limit requirements exist for mandatory or prohibiting orders, but such orders should be applied for without undue delay.

The test for whether leave should be granted to an applicant was expressed by the High Court in Lai Swee Lin Linda v. Public Service Commission (2000), and approved by the Court of Appeal, in the following terms:

[T]he duty of the court hearing an ex parte application ... was not to embark upon any detailed and microscopic analysis of the material placed before it but ... to peruse the material before it quickly and appraise whether such material disclosed an arguable and a prima facie case of reasonable suspicion.

Once leave is granted, an applicant moves on to the second stage and applies for a prerogative order by filing in the High Court a document called a summons within the legal proceedings already started earlier. This must be done between eight and 14 days after leave to do so is granted by the Court; beyond that, the leave lapses. The applicant must serve the ex parte originating summons, the statement, the supporting affidavit, the order granting leave, and the summons by which the prerogative order is actually applied for, on all persons directly affected. Where the application relates to court proceedings and is intended to compel the court or a court official to do an act relating to the proceedings, or to quash the proceedings or any order made in them, the documents must be served on the registrar of the court and the other parties to the proceedings. The documents must also be served on the judge if his or her conduct is being objected to. If the Court is of opinion that any person who ought to have been served with the documents has not been served, the Court may adjourn the hearing on such terms as it may direct in order that the documents may be served on that person.

The High Court has dispensed with the two-stage process and dealt with applications on the merits at the first stage in cases that involved only pure questions of law and where there were no factual disputes.

==== Orders for review of detention ====
The procedure for applying for an order for review of detention differs from that for obtaining a mandatory order, prohibiting order or quashing order because the latter orders are only available by leave of court, whereas an order for review of detention may be applied for without prior permission from the court. The procedure for doing so is set out in Order 54 of the Rules of Court. An application must be made to the High Court by way of an ex parte originating summons, supported, if possible, by an affidavit from the person being restrained which shows that the application is being made at his or her instance and explaining the nature of the restraint. If the person under restraint is unable to personally make an affidavit, someone may do so on his or her behalf, explaining the reason for the inability.

Upon the filing of the application, the Court may either make an order immediately, or direct that a summons for the order for review of detention be issued to enable all the parties involved to present arguments to the Court. If the latter course is taken, the ex parte originating summons, supporting affidavit, order of court and summons must be served on the person against whom the order is sought. Unless the Court directs otherwise, it is not necessary for the person under restraint to be brought before the Court for the hearing of the application. In addition, the Court may order that the person be released while the application is being heard. Once the Court decides to make an order for review of detention, it will direct when the person under restraint is to be brought before the court.

The applicant has the initial burden of showing that he or she has a prima facie case that should be considered by the Court. Once this has been done, it is for the executive to justify the legality of the detention. One commentator has said that the applicant's task is to discharge his or her evidential burden, following which the public authority detaining the applicant has a legal burden of showing that the detention is lawful. The standard of proof required to be achieved by the authority is the civil standard of a balance of probabilities, but "flexibly applied" in the sense that the degree of probability must be appropriate to what is at stake. Thus, in Khawaja Lord Bridge of Harwich said that given the seriousness of the allegations against a detainee and the consequences of the detention, "the court should not be satisfied with anything less than probability of a high degree".

== Declarations ==
In addition to prerogative orders, the equitable remedy of a declaration can be employed to control an excess of legal authority. A declaration is a pronouncement by a court stating the legal position between the parties to an action, based on the facts that have been presented to the court. In contrast to the prerogative orders which are termed public law remedies, the declaration is called a private law remedy as it was originally developed in court cases between private parties. Only the High Court may grant declarations in judicial review cases; although the Subordinate Courts are generally empowered by the Subordinate Courts Act to grant declarations, a District Court exercises no judicial review jurisdiction over acts or decisions of persons or authorities, and a Magistrate's Court cannot deal with any action in which there is no claim for any sum of money.

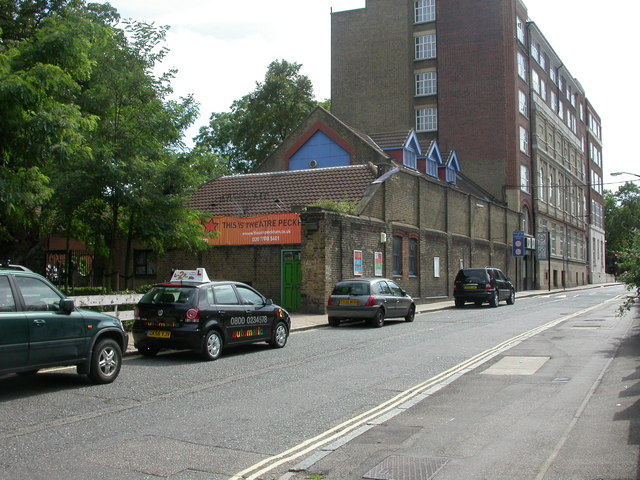
Havil Hall in Southwark, London, now occupied by Theatre Peckham. In a 1983 case, the Queen's Bench Division of the High Court held that the refusal of Southwark London Borough Council to permit a National Front by-election candidate to use the hall, while contrary to a declaration that the candidate had a legal right to do so, did not amount to a contempt of court.

A declaration is only as effective as the willingness of a public body to abide by the court's statement of the law in it, as it is not a contempt of court to ignore a declaration. In Webster v. Southwark London Borough Council (1982), Webster was a parliamentary candidate for the National Front, a far right racial nationalist political party, who wanted to hold an election meeting in a hall owned by Southwark London Borough Council. Despite being required by provisions of the Representation of the People Act 1949 (12, 13 & 14 Geo. 6. c. 68 (UK)) to permit Webster to use the hall, the local council refused to do so as it did not agree with Webster's political views. The court made a declaration that Webster was legally entitled to use the hall at a certain time for the purpose of his election campaign, on the assumption that the local council would obey it. Nonetheless, the local council still refused to allow Webster use of the hall. It was held that a declaration is not a coercive order of the court and, accordingly, refusal to comply with it is not contempt.

There is some authority to the effect that a court will not generally grant a declaration if it considers the issue at hand to be an academic question or one that is entirely hypothetical. For instance, in Vince v. Chief Constable of Dorset Police (1992), proceedings against the Chief Constable of Dorset Police were brought by the plaintiffs on behalf of members of the Police Federation of England and Wales to, among other things, enable chief constables throughout the country to know where they stood on a question of law with respect to the Police and Criminal Evidence Act 1984, namely, whether it was unlawful to appoint an acting sergeant as a custody officer under section 36(3) of the Act. Affirming the decision of the judge below, a majority of the Court of Appeal declined to make a declaration on the matter. It took the view that since there was no evidence that any chief constable had ever appointed an acting sergeant as a custody officer, the issue was academic or hypothetical.

However, at least in the UK, there are signs that the courts may be moving towards showing more flexibility in granting advisory declarations. In R. v. Secretary of State for the Home Department, ex parte Salem (1999), Salem, a citizen of Libya, was granted temporary admission to the UK to pursue an asylum claim. One month later, the Home Office recorded in an internal file that Salem's asylum claim had been refused, but did not communicate the decision to him. Salem only found out when his income support ceased, and the Benefits Agency told him that they had been informed that he had been refused asylum. Subsequently, Salem unsuccessfully sought leave to apply for judicial review of the Home Secretary's decision to notify the Department of Social Security that his asylum claim had been rejected. He then obtained leave to appeal the matter to the House of Lords, but was then granted refugee status. Before the House of Lords, Salem argued that his appeal should still be heard as the question of law in his case was one of general public importance. The court held that it had discretion to hear an appeal which concerns an issue involving a public authority as to a question of public law, even where there is no longer any live issue which would affect the rights and duties of the parties themselves. However, the court cautioned that this discretion has to be exercised with circumspection and entertained only where there was a good public interest reason to do so. It is not yet known whether the Singapore High Court will adopt a similar approach.

The Singapore courts have also yet to directly address the issue of the standing required to apply for a declaration in an administrative law case. In Karaha Bodas Co. LLC v. Pertamina Energy Trading Ltd. (2005) – not a judicial review case – the Court of Appeal expressed the view that the applicant "must be asserting the recognition of a 'right' that is personal to him". It cited the House of Lords' decision of Gouriet v. Union of Post Office Workers (1977), which held that a plaintiff could not be granted a declaration unless he or she:

... in proper proceedings, in which there is a dispute between the plaintiff and the defendant concerning their legal respective rights or liabilities either asserts a legal right which is denied or threatened, or claims immunity from some claim of the defendant against him or claims that the defendant is infringing or threatens to infringe some public right so as to inflict special damage on the plaintiff.

The Court preferred the position taken in Gouriet rather than the more flexible approach taken in Re S (Hospital Patient: Court's Jurisdiction) (1995) where, so long as there existed a "real and present dispute between the parties as to the existence or extent of a legal right" and each of the parties to the litigation "would be affected by the determination of the issue", it was not necessary for the legal right to be vested in the parties. One of the reasons it came to this conclusion was that Re S is regarded by some scholars as more consistent with rule 40.20 of the Civil Procedure Rules, which states: "The court may make binding declarations whether or not any other remedy is claimed." On the other hand, the relevant Singaporean provision is Order 15, rule 16, of the Rules of Court, which reads: "No action or other proceedings shall be open to objection on the ground that a merely declaratory judgment or order is sought thereby, and the Court may make binding declarations of right whether or not any consequential relief is or could be claimed." [Emphasis added.] Hence, the Court concluded that its jurisdiction to make declarations is "confined to declaring contested legal rights of the parties represented in the litigation".

In Tan Eng Hong v. Attorney-General (2011), the applicant sought a declaration that section 377A of the Penal Code was unconstitutional. The High Court stated that a person who is asserting an infringement of a constitutional liberty must establish that he or she has not merely a sufficient interest but a substantial interest in the matter, that is, he or she must be alleging a violation of a fundamental liberty. The Court did not discuss the issue of standing in the context of administrative law.

=== Procedure for declarations ===
Before May 2011, it was not possible to apply for prerogative orders and declarations in the same set of legal proceedings. In Chan Hiang Leng Colin, the appellants contended that a declaration might be obtained in proceedings taken under Order 53 of the Rules of Court. The Court of Appeal, following Re Application by Dow Jones (Asia) Inc. (1987), held that it had no power to grant a declaration under Order 53 because a declaration is not a form of prerogative order. If a declaration was sought, it had to be applied for by way of writ if there were substantial factual disputes between the parties, or, if not, by originating summons. In Yip Kok Seng v. Traditional Chinese Medicine Practitioners Board (2010), the High Court expressed the view that due to the lack of a unified regime in Singapore for applying for prerogative orders and declarations, it was not an abuse of process for an applicant to seek redress for a public law right by way of a declaration instead of applying for a prerogative order.

With effect from 1 May 2011, it became possible to include an application for a declaration together with an application for one or more prerogative orders. However, the application for a declaration cannot be made unless the court grants leave for the prerogative orders to be applied for.

== Remedies that are unavailable ==
=== Injunctions ===
An injunction is an equitable private law remedy that restrains a public body from doing an act that is wrongful or ultra vires. Following law reforms in the United Kingdom in 1977, it became possible for the High Court of England and Wales to grant prerogative orders as well as a declaration or injunction in the same set of legal proceedings. As these reforms have not been followed in Singapore, the Singapore High Court is not empowered to grant injunctions under Order 53 of the Rules of Court.

In addition, if civil proceedings are taken against the Government, section 27 of the Government Proceedings Act bars the High Court from granting injunctions against it. In place of an injunction, the Court may make a declaration concerning the parties' rights. The Court also may not make an injunction against a government officer if the effect of doing so would be to provide relief that could not be obtained against the Government directly. Section 2(2) of the Act makes it clear that the term civil proceedings includes proceedings for judicial review.

=== Damages ===
At common law, there is no general right to claim damages – that is, monetary compensation – if rules of public law have been breached by a public authority. In order to obtain damages, an aggrieved person must be able to establish a private law claim in contract or tort law. While such a person would previously have had to take out a legal action for damages separately from any judicial review proceedings, since May 2011 it has been possible for a person who has successfully obtained prerogative orders or a declaration to ask the High Court to also award him or her "relevant relief", that is, a liquidated sum, damages, equitable relief or restitution. The Court may give directions to the parties relating to the conduct of the proceedings or otherwise to determine whether the applicant is entitled to the relevant relief sought, and must allow any party opposing the granting of such relief an opportunity to be heard.

A special tort that applies only against public authorities is the tort of misfeasance in public office. To successfully make out the tort, a claimant must establish the following elements:

- the public authority acted maliciously, or while knowing that it had no power to act;
- it is foreseeable that the claimant would be harmed in some way by the act; and
- the claimant suffered damage as a result of the act.

In Lines International Holding (S) Pte. Ltd. v. Singapore Tourist Promotion Board (1997), the plaintiff, a cruise operator, claimed that the Singapore Tourism Promotion Board and the Port of Singapore Authority had committed the tort by denying it berths for its ship conducting "cruises to nowhere" on which the main activity was gambling. The High Court found that the plaintiff had failed to establish this claim. Since the authorities had not acted ultra vires, they could not have acted while knowing they lacked the power to do so. Moreover, the plaintiff had not adduced any evidence of the financial damage it had incurred due to the denial of berths. It has been said that "the tort is of quite limited value and importance as a means of controlling the ordinary run of inadvertent government illegality".

If a claimant establishes that a public authority's wrongful action amounts to a tort, he or she may be able to obtain exemplary damages if it can be shown that the authority has been guilty of "oppressive, arbitrary or unconstitutional action" in the exercise of a public function.
