= Re Fong Thin Choo =

1991 Singaporean legal case

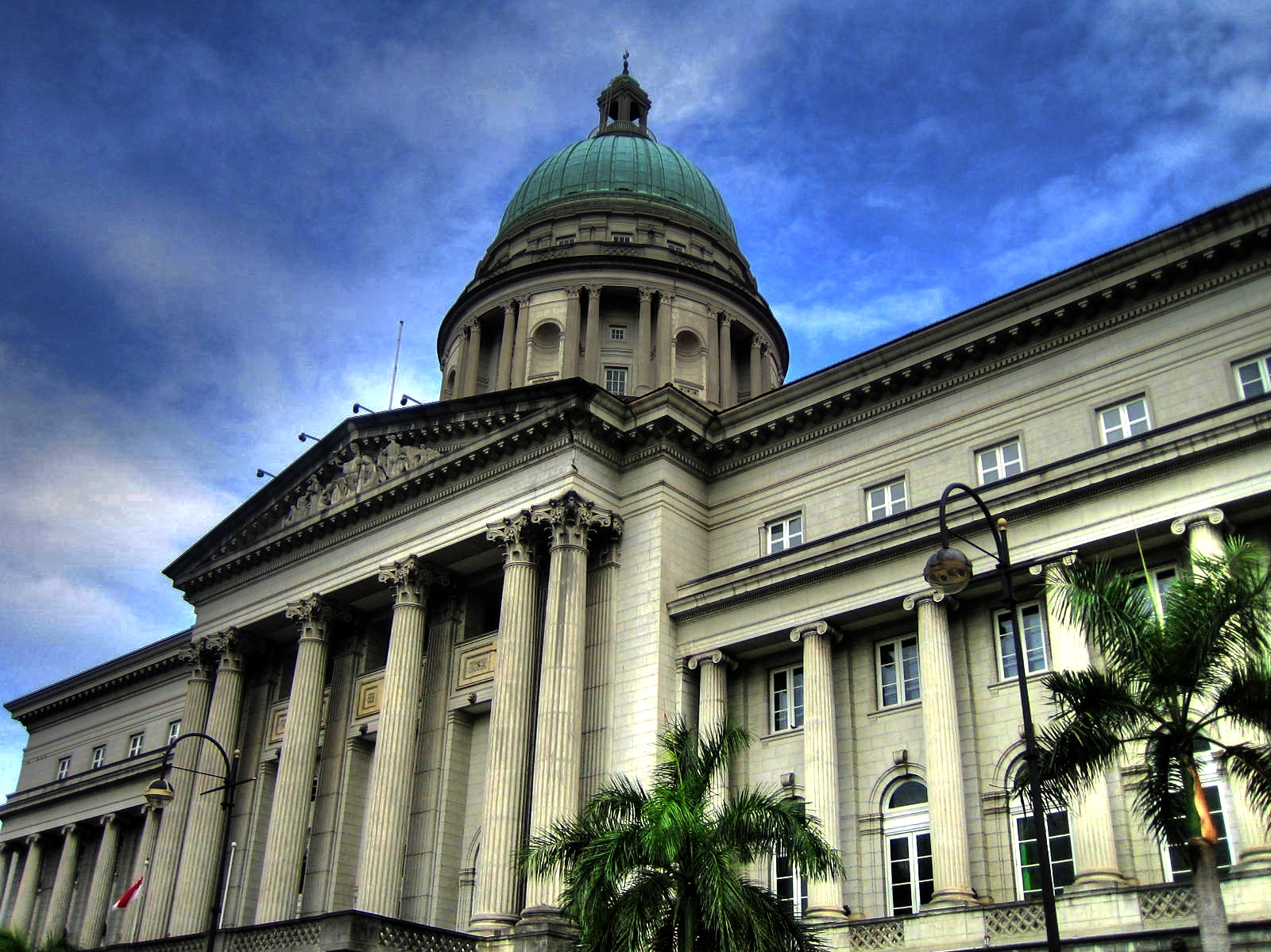
- The Old Supreme Court Building, photographed in April 2007
- Court: High Court of Singapore
- Full case name: Re Fong Thin Choo
- Decided: 29 April 1991
- Citation: [1991] 1 S.L.R.(R.) 774

Court membership
- Judge sitting: Chan Sek Keong J.

Case opinions
- Order of prohibition issued against the Director-General of Customs and Excise to prevent him from collecting customs duty from a company for allegedly not exporting goods as he had insufficiently inquired into the facts and had thus made his decision on an incorrect basis of fact.

Re Fong Thin Choo is an administrative law case decided in 1991 by the High Court of Singapore concerning the legality of a demand by the Director-General of Customs and Excise ("DG") that the applicant's company pay S$130,241.30 in customs duty as it had not exported certain goods. The case was presided over by Justice Chan Sek Keong. The Court decided that the DG had failed to take into account relevant evidence adduced by the applicant's company which could have been capable of rebutting the prima facie evidence of non-export, and had thus made an insufficient inquiry before arriving at his decision. Since the DG's demand had been based on an incorrect basis of fact and thus had been made contrary to law, the Court granted the applicant an order of prohibition that barred the DG from deducting the sum from certain bankers' guarantees that the applicant's company had lodged with Customs as security.

The case appears to have introduced error of material fact into Singapore case law as a ground of judicial review. While the term error of material fact was not explicitly stated in the case, the Court applied the legal rule laid down in the UK case Secretary of State for Education and Science v. Tameside Metropolitan Borough Council (1976) that a court may interfere with a government decision which has been based on a misunderstanding or ignorance of an established and relevant fact, and/or an incorrect basis of fact.

Courts in several jurisdictions including Australia, New Zealand, South Africa and the UK have followed the Tameside decision and recognized error of material fact as a distinct ground of judicial review. In the case E v. Secretary of State for the Home Department (2004), the Court of Appeal of England and Wales set out four essential requirements that must be met in order for the ground of review to be successful. It remains to be seen whether the Singapore courts will adopt this refinement of the Tameside test.

== Facts ==
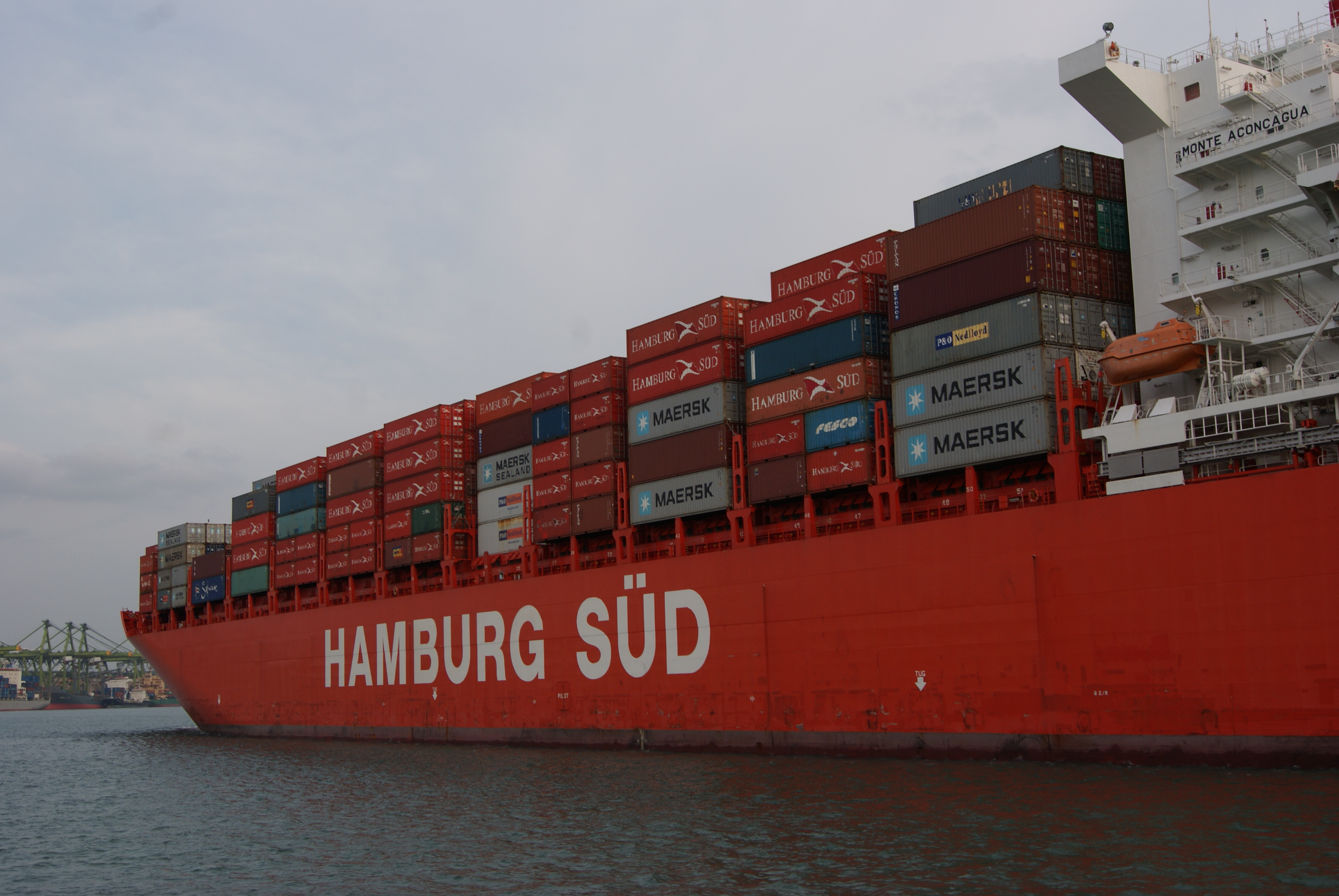
A container ship in Singapore waters, photographed in February 2011

Around 12 December 1981, a company called Szetoh Import & Export Pte. Ltd. removed a large quantity of cigarettes from a licensed warehouse and transported them to the port for loading on to a vessel called the M.V. Sempurna Sejati to be exported out of the country. Although the Singapore Customs supervised the removal and transport of the goods, it did not supervise the loading of the goods on to the vessel. Subsequently, the company delivered to the Customs three outward declarations showing that the goods had been loaded on to the vessel.

Months later, a customs officer discovered that the goods had not been entered into the vessel's manifest. The Director-General of Customs and Excise ("DG") then made inquiries with the agent of the vessel, referred to in the judgment as "TTS", who denied that the goods had been loaded. The DG subsequently asked the company to furnish evidence of the export of the goods. On 19 September 1988, the company produced a document signed by a businessman, "TKM", stating that he had purchased and received the goods. After further correspondence, the DG concluded that the goods had not been exported and requested the company to pay S$130,241.30 in customs duty pursuant to regulation 12(6) of the Customs Regulations 1979.

On 30 December 1988, the applicant Fong Thin Choo, a director of the company, applied to the High Court of Singapore for leave to obtain a writ of prohibition (now known as a prohibiting order) to prohibit the DG from recovering this sum by deducting it from certain bankers' guarantees that had been lodged with Customs as security. When the Court was hearing the application to grant leave, the State Counsel, relying on section 27 of the Government Proceedings Act, submitted that the court had no jurisdiction to issue an order of prohibition against the Government.

== Legal issues ==
Justice Chan Sek Keong, who heard the application, identified two legal issues:

- Whether section 27 of the Government Proceedings Act strips the court of its jurisdiction to grant an order of prohibition against the Government.
- Whether the DG had acted on an incorrect basis of fact (or error of material fact) when deciding if the goods had been exported under regulation 12(6) of the Customs Regulations 1979.

== Grounds of the decision ==
Justice Chan held that the High Court had jurisdiction to issue an order of prohibition against the DG's decision, as section 27 of the Government Proceedings Act did not strip the court of such jurisdiction. Furthermore, the DG had acted on an incorrect basis of fact in arriving at his decision that the goods had not been exported. This fact could have been verified objectively with evidence put forward by the applicant, but the DG had not carried out an adequate investigation. This had the effect of making the investigation unfair towards the applicant's company. Hence, an order of prohibition was entered against the DG.

=== Jurisdiction to order prohibition ===
Justice Chan began by affirming that the High Court has jurisdiction to issue an order of prohibition against the Government. Although section 27 of the Government Proceedings Act states that courts cannot grant an injunction in civil proceedings against the Government, he rejected the State Counsel's argument that based on this provision the Court did not have power to do so. He held that the reference in section 27 to civil proceedings it did not relate to judicial review proceedings and, hence, that provision did not affect the court's ability to grant an order of prohibition during a judicial review of government proceedings.

Justice Chan held further that the legal principles applicable to certiorari (now known as quashing orders) are equally applicable to an order of prohibition. These principles were stated in R. v. Criminal Injuries Compensation Board, ex parte Lain (1967), where it was held that "the ambit of certiorari can be said to cover every case in which a body of persons of a public as opposed to a purely private or domestic character has to determine matters affecting subjects provided always that it has a duty to act judicially". As the DG was a public officer appointed to discharge public duties, his decision was an exercise of public duty. Hence the DG could be subjected to an order of prohibition if he acted in excess of his authority.

=== Incorrect basis of fact (error as to material fact) ===
Justice Chan went on to examine the case on the basis that the DG had the discretion to decide if the evidence provided to him accounted for the export of the goods, and could order customs duty to be paid if he had a factual basis for concluding that the goods had not been exported. Should the DG not have such a factual basis, he would not be able to request for the duty to be paid, and if he did he would have acted upon an incorrect basis of fact.

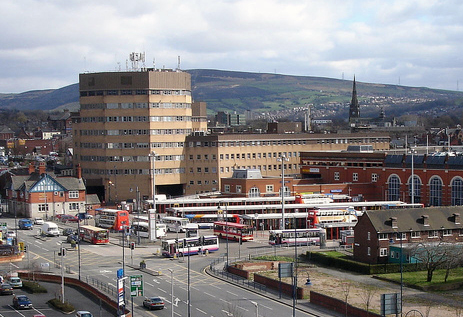
Tameside Council Offices in Ashton-under-Lyne, Greater Manchester, UK. In a 1976 decision originally brought by the Education Secretary against Tameside Metropolitan Borough Council over the latter's refusal to implement a system of comprehensive education, the House of Lords held that a public authority's decision may be judicially reviewed if it is unsupported by evidence or has been based on incorrect facts.

Justice Chan relied on a United Kingdom case, Secretary of State for Education and Science v. Tameside Metropolitan Borough Council (1976), to ascertain the law with regard to this ground of judicial review. In this case, the House of Lords held that statutory provisions which are framed to include the word satisfaction may exclude judicial review on matters of pure judgment by the decision-maker, but judicial review will not be excluded in all cases. Lord Wilberforce held that when the judgment is dependent on the existence of relevant facts, the court has to ascertain if the facts truly exist and if they have been properly taken into account, although the evaluation of the facts is for the decision-maker alone. If these requirements are not met, an aggrieved person is entitled to challenge the decision, and the court can intervene on the grounds that the decision-maker acted outside its powers, outside the purpose of the legislation empowering it, unfairly, or upon an incorrect basis of fact. Lord Diplock mentioned it was also necessary to consider if the decision-maker had taken into consideration only matters which he ought to have considered.

Justice Chan proceeded to examine the statutory scheme relating to the export of dutiable goods and the imposition of customs duty on such goods. He focused on regulation 12(6) of the Customs Regulations 1979, which provides as follows:

The owner of any goods removed under the provisions of this regulation or his agent shall, if so required by the proper officer of customs, produce evidence that such goods have been exported or re-exported and shall pay the customs duty leviable on any part of such goods —

(a) not accounted for to the satisfaction of the proper officer of customs; or
(b) if they are found to have been illegally re-landed in Singapore.

He held that, as in Tameside, the "satisfaction" referred to in regulation 12(6) is not a matter of pure judgment or opinion. It is also concerned with an inquiry as to a fact, namely, whether dutiable goods have been exported. Thus, the applicant had to produce evidence to show that the goods had been exported and this evidence had to be to the satisfaction of the DG. Justice Chan affirmed that the test to ascertain if the DG's decision was valid was to determine if the DG could reasonably have come to his decision based on the evidence before him, or, in other words, whether the DG had decided based on a tenable factual basis.

Justice Chan's answer to this question was in the negative. His decision to grant an order of prohibition was based on four grounds:

1. The DG could not reasonably have reached his conclusion without hearing the applicant's witnesses.
2. The DG had misdirected himself on the nature of evidence required under regulation 12(6) to prove the export of the goods.
3. The DG, in making an insufficient inquiry, had failed to take into account relevant considerations before arriving at his decision.
4. The investigation had not been fair to the applicant.

==== Ground 1: the DG could not reasonably have reached his conclusion without hearing the applicant's witnesses ====
The applicant had brought forward several key witnesses who had testified that the goods had indeed been exported based on their accounts of the various stages of the export. The witnesses' testimonies ranged from those affirming they had witnessed the goods being loaded on to the vessel and being transferred on to a separate vessel in Singapore waters, to the buyers confirming they had indeed received the exported goods and had paid for them.

The witnesses' testimonies had the possible effect of proving the export of the goods, which would have contradicted the findings of fact that had been made by the DG in his investigation. It was thus necessary for the DG to have investigated the claims made by the applicant' witnesses to reach a reasonable conclusion. Hence, by not investigating the claims made by the applicant, the DG could not have reasonably come to the decision made by him due to the presence of plausible contradictory evidence.

==== Ground 2: the DG misdirected himself on the nature of evidence required ====
Although the DG had based his decision on evidence, he had misdirected himself as to the nature and effect of the evidence required to prove the export of the goods. While the DG had prima facie evidence to show that the goods had not been exported, the applicant had submitted his own evidence to rebut this finding. The nature and effect of the evidence was to nullify the factual basis upon which the DG had made his decision. It was sufficient that the applicant's evidence had such an effect, and the DG, in failing to recognize this while placing undue weight on his own evidence, had misdirected himself as to the nature and effect of the evidence required to prove the export of the goods.

==== Ground 3: the DG had failed to take into account relevant considerations ====
In total, nine affidavits were submitted by the applicant to substantiate his claims that the goods had indeed been exported. The state counsel submitted that the evidence which had been provided after December 1988 (when the application for an order of prohibition was taken out) could not be taken into consideration. While Justice Chan doubted the validity of such a submission, he nevertheless proceeded to assess the affidavits provided before this date. The applicable evidence was made up of two statements: a statement made by the applicant that his company had arranged for shipment of the goods directly with the shipowner (which explained why the vessel's agents testified that they were not aware that any goods had been loaded on to the vessel), and a statement by TKM accompanied with copies of invoices that showed he had received the goods and paid for them. Such evidence could have proved the export of the goods, and was in direct conflict with the affidavits submitted by the DG. There was thus a serious dispute as to whether the goods had in fact been exported.

While Justice Chan did not seek to come to a conclusion as to whether the applicant's evidence or the DG's evidence was to be believed, the DG had to thoroughly review the evidence produced by the applicant. Although the DG could have preferred the evidence which would have proven non-export, the lack of investigation of such evidence was fatal to the DG's case. By not investigating the contradictory evidence, the DG could not be said to have taken "reasonable steps to acquaint himself with the relevant information" to enable him to determine whether the goods had been exported. Hence, the DG had failed to take into account relevant considerations since he had not investigated the relevant evidence put forward by the applicant.

==== Ground 4: the investigation was not fair to the applicant ====
The investigation was deemed to have been unfair to the applicant as the DG, in making his decision, had preferred the evidence offered to him by a crew member and an employee of the vessel's agent, TTS, without having first fully investigated the evidence adduced by the applicant and his witnesses. If the DG had done so, the evidence submitted by the applicant could have been sufficient to prove that the goods had indeed been exported.

=== Error as to a precedent fact ===
Justice Chan mentioned on an obiter basis that whether dutiable goods removed for export are illegally landed or whether such goods have been exported are questions of fact. Further, it must be proven by evidence whether a particular fact exists. Hence, regulation 12(6) requires the establishment of a "precedent fact". It was insufficient that the DG had believed or opined that the goods had not been exported (no matter how reasonable the belief was); rather, it was a fact that had to be objectively ascertained. The applicant's company could only be liable to pay the customs duty levied on the goods after this fact has been established.

Further, Justice Chan, relying on the English case of Khera v. Secretary of State for the Home Department; Khawaja v. Secretary of State for the Home Department ("Khawaja", 1983), took the view that in cases of this nature, the court's role was not to look at whether the decision-maker could have made a reasonable decision, but to decide whether the decision made could have been justified by the evidence present.

That said, as the applicant did not rely on the ground of error as to a precedent fact, Justice Chan did not base his decision on this ground.

== Commentary ==
=== Error as to material fact as a separate ground of judicial review in other jurisdictions ===
Traditionally, courts have been reluctant to interfere in cases where decision-makers are alleged to have made errors of fact, mainly because the courts' role in judicial review of administrative actions is to examine the legality and not the merits of the decisions of public authorities. However, errors of fact can cause injustice and unfairness to the individuals involved. In light of this, judges have suggested, albeit obiter, that the courts' "supervisory jurisdiction over questions of fact might be broader than the traditional approach indicates".

The case of Tameside is widely accepted as being the first case which suggests a novel approach to factual error. There, the court asserted that administrative decisions may be reviewed if there has been a "misunderstanding or ignorance of an established and relevant fact", and/or the decision-maker has acted "outside his power, or unfairly, or upon an incorrect basis of fact". That is to say, even if it is for the decision-maker to evaluate the facts, the court can inquire into whether those facts exist and have been taken into account, whether the decision was made on a proper self-direction as to those facts, and whether irrelevant facts have been taken into account. Thus, the court's power in judicial review was broadened to allow for a limited factual inquiry. This ground of judicial review has been termed as an error of material fact.

Courts in several jurisdictions including Australia, New Zealand, South Africa and the UK have followed the Tameside decision and conclusively recognized error of material fact as a distinct ground of judicial review. These jurisdictions have categorized an error of material fact as an error of law, while specifying that the error must have been material to the outcome of a particular case before the court can quash the decision made.

==== UK ====
In the UK, the law has developed to a point where "it is now possible to say that material error of fact leading to unfairness constitutes a discrete ground for judicial review". In E v. Secretary of State for the Home Department (2004), Lord Justice Carnwath asserted that "the time has now come to accept that a mistake of fact giving rise to unfairness is a separate head of challenge in an appeal on a point of law." To succeed in such a challenge, four essential requirements must be met:

1. There must have been a mistake as to an existing fact, including a mistake as to the availability of evidence on a particular matter.
2. The fact or evidence must be "established", in the sense that it is uncontentious and objectively verifiable.
3. The appellant (or his or her advisers) must not have been responsible for the mistake.
4. The mistake must have played a material, though not necessarily decisive, part in the tribunal's reasoning.

==== Australia ====
In Australia, common law grounds of judicial review were codified in the Administrative Decisions (Judicial Review) Act 1977. Findings of fact may be reviewed under sections 5(1)(f) and 6(1)(f) of the Act, provided the error is material to the decision. Hence, error of material fact is statutorily recognized in Australia as a ground of judicial review, and is classified as an error of law.

==== New Zealand ====
In New Zealand, errors of material fact are dealt with as failures to take into account relevant considerations or taking into account irrelevant ones, rather than treated as a separate ground of review. As in the UK, this ground of judicial review is classified as an error of law, and "in order to make out the ground, the error must be sufficiently material to be described as the basis or the probable basis of the decision".

=== Applicability of the ground of error as to material fact in Singapore ===
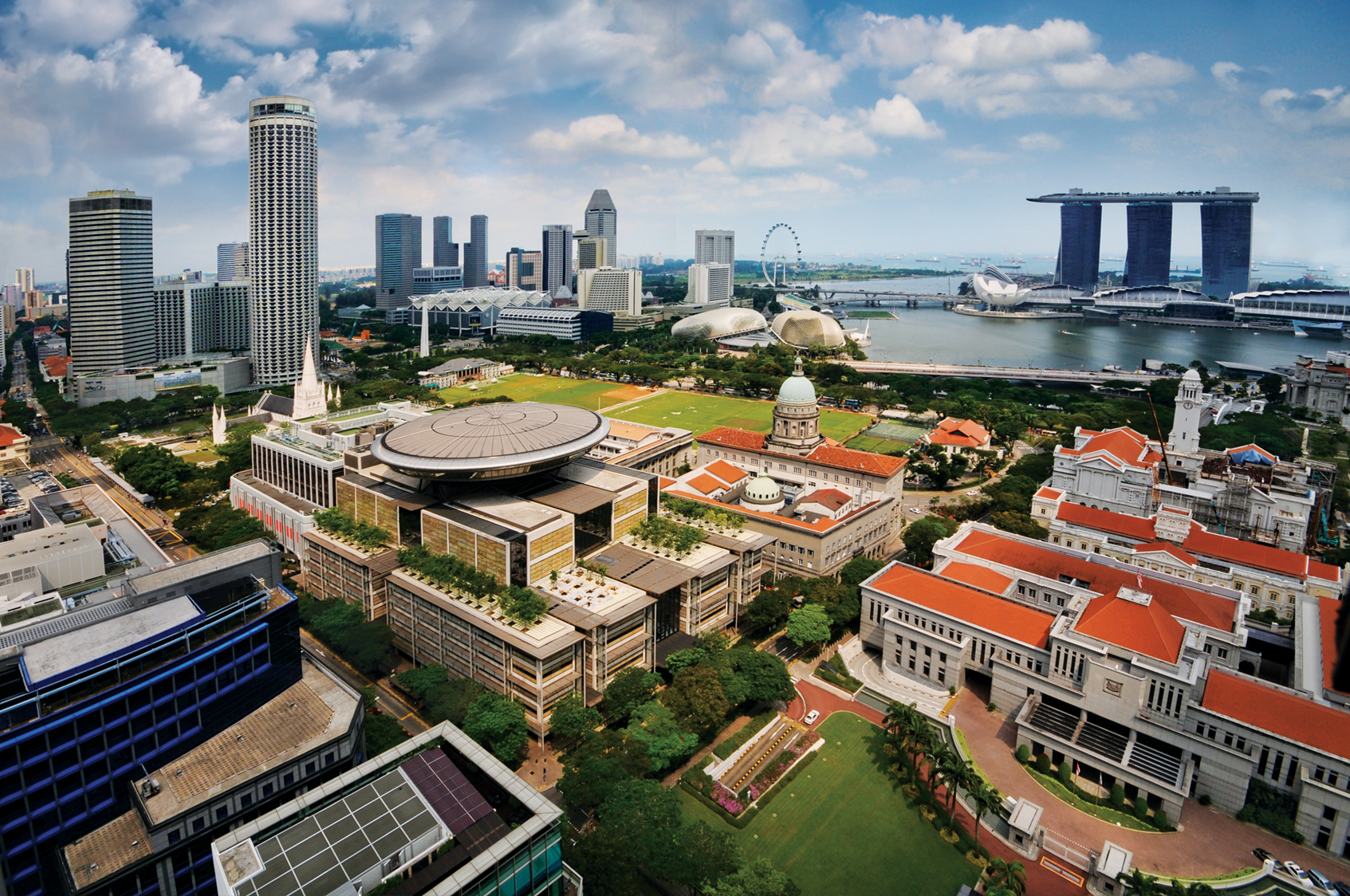
An aerial view of the Supreme Court of Singapore (with disc). Will the Singapore courts apply the principles laid down in the UK case E v. Home Secretary (2004)?

In Fong Thin Choo, the Singapore High Court applied the approach to factual error adumbrated by Lord Justice Scarman in Tameside. Thus, it has been accepted that the courts in Singapore may invalidate the decision of a public authority when there has been a misunderstanding or ignorance of an established and relevant fact.

However, there is still no certainty as to how judges will apply their powers of judicial review when an error of material fact has been committed. Fong Thin Choo was decided in 1991, prior to the UK case E v. Home Secretary. Hence, it still remains to be seen if the courts in Singapore will adopt the four requirements that were laid down in E v. Home Secretary. One view is that there is little reason for the courts to reject these requirements, given that Fong Thin Choo cited Tameside with approval, and E v. Home Secretary was based upon this case.

However, a criticism of the E v. Home Secretary approach is that "it might undermine the important principle of finality". Moreover, the fear of opening the floodgates of litigation could be another pressing concern. These worries were expressed by the UK courts in Shaheen v Secretary of State for the Home Department (2005) and in MT (Algeria) v. Secretary of State for the Home Department (2007). In MT (Algeria), the Court of Appeal of England and Wales went so far as to warn against embracing this ground of review as it might have the effect of "turn[ing] what is a simple error of fact into an error of law by asserting some new fact which is itself contentious".

All these worries point to the need for a stringent test to be set out and applied, and it has been suggested that such a test is already available in the form of the four "burdensome" requirements laid down in E v. Home Secretary. Not only are the four requirements difficult to establish (which would allay the concerns about a flood of litigation and the principle of finality), they also provide a guiding framework as to what merits judicial review based on an error of material fact.
