= Precedent fact errors in Singapore law =

Singaporean legal doctrine

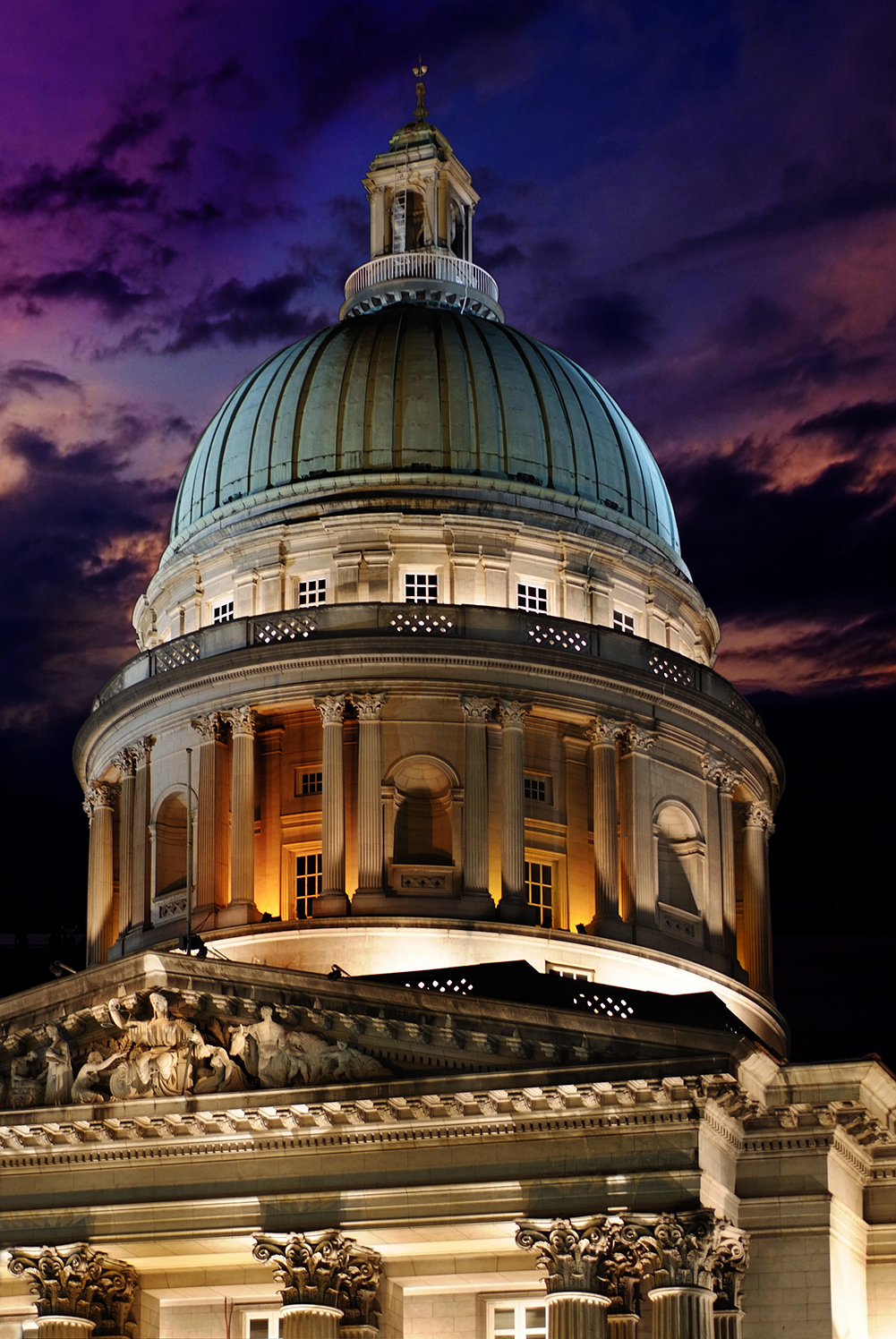
The dome of the old Supreme Court of Singapore at dusk, where the High Court used to sit. An application can be made to the Court for judicial review on the basis of an error as to a precedent fact, which is a form of illegality.

Errors as to precedent facts, sometimes called jurisdictional facts, in Singapore administrative law are errors committed by public authorities concerning facts that must objectively exist or not exist before the authorities have the power to take actions or make decisions under legislation. If an error concerning a precedent fact is made, the statutory power has not been exercised lawfully and may be quashed by the High Court if judicial review is applied for by an aggrieved person. The willingness of the Court to review such errors of fact is an exception to the general rule that the Court only reviews errors of law.

In the United Kingdom, the House of Lords has held that the nature of the decision-making process that the public authority is required to engage in determines whether a matter falls into the precedent fact category. If the process is complex and much discretion is accorded to the authority by the empowering statute, the court is unlikely to find that a precedent fact is involved. On the other hand, where an administrative decision interferes with an individual's liberty, the matter will be considered within the precedent fact category unless Parliament has explicitly excluded judicial review. If Parliament intends to do so, it must make its meaning crystal clear.

As Singapore inherited English administrative law upon independence, the Singapore courts have adopted the UK position, holding that it is necessary to construe the relevant statutory provisions to ascertain whether Parliament has expressed an intention in plain and unequivocal words to take a discretion conferred on the executive out of the precedent fact category.

== Introduction ==
=== Distinction between errors of law and errors of fact ===
Errors of law committed by public authorities when they act or make decisions are within the jurisdiction of the High Court of Singapore to correct by way of judicial review. On the other hand, the Court is generally unwilling to intervene where the alleged error is one that concerns the facts of the matter. The rationale for this rule is that it is the Court's role in judicial review of administrative action to scrutinise the legality and not the merits of the decisions of public authorities.

It has been said that an error of fact involves a situation where there are new or different primary facts yet to be put before the court, such as a new witness, or what people saw or heard, whereas an error of law involves a misinterpretation of a statutory word or phrase with regard to such facts. However, this distinction is debatable, and the view has been taken that courts sometimes simply regard a matter as one involving an error of law if they wish to adopt an interventionist approach, and seek to allow judicial review to take place.

In Re Fong Thin Choo (1991), the High Court accepted that if an authority's discretion depends on the existence of certain facts, the court must ensure that those facts exist and have been taken into account by the authority, that the authority has exercised its discretion on a proper self-direction as to those facts, and that the authority has not taken into account matters it ought not to have considered. Law professor Thio Li-ann has expressed the view that this decision indicates a court is primarily concerned with whether an error that has been committed is serious – if so, the court will exercise judicial review, regardless of whether the error is jurisdictional or non-jurisdictional in nature. "Since the law/fact boundary becomes indistinct, this fudges the conceptual moorings of judicial review as confined to scrutinising legal error. An intrusive review of factual findings threatens to turn review into appeal."

=== Mixed fact and law ===
Occasionally, the distinction between errors of law and errors of fact can be fuzzy. Where a public authority is alleged to have committed an error of mixed fact and law, the High Court is more likely to leave the matter to the authority and decline to intervene. This can be the case where a statutory term evaluated by the authority is so general and ambiguous that reasonable people may peg different meanings to it. In such a situation, it is generally left to the authority to evaluate the meaning of the term. This is illustrated by Puhlhofer v. Hillingdon London Borough Council (1986), which involved a public authority that bore a statutory responsibility for providing homeless people with accommodation. The applicants were a married couple who lived with their two children in a single room in a guest house. Their application for permanent accommodation was rejected because the authority claimed they were not "homeless" within the meaning of the statute. The House of Lords upheld this decision, determining that the issue of whether the applicants had accommodation was a question of fact to be determined by the public authority:

Where the existence or non-existence of a fact is left to the judgment and discretion of a public body and that fact involves a broad spectrum ranging from the obvious to the debatable to the just conceivable, it is the duty of the court to leave the decision of that fact to the public body to whom Parliament has entrusted the decision-making power save in a case where it is obvious that the public body, consciously or unconsciously, are acting perversely.

== Errors as to precedent facts ==
An error as to a jurisdictional, or precedent, fact is an exception to the general rule that the High Court does not judicially review errors of fact. Under the threefold classification of the broad grounds of judicial review set out in Council of Civil Service Unions v. Minister for the Civil Service ("the GCHQ case", 1983) – illegality, irrationality and procedural impropriety – an error as to a precedent fact may be regarded as a form of illegality.

An error as to a precedent fact, if committed, deprives the public authority of power to take the action or make the decision in question. The existence or non-existence of the fact, as the case may be, is a condition precedent or prerequisite to the exercise of the power. An example of an error of this nature can be found in the United Kingdom case White & Collins v. Minister of Health (1939). In that case, under the relevant statute, the authority could only issue a compulsory purchase order affecting the applicants' land if it was not part of, among other things, a park. A minister confirmed the purchase order but the Court of Appeal of England and Wales held that it should be quashed, finding that the minister could not exercise power to acquire the land since it was part of a park. Whether the land was or was not a park was a precedent fact, and the minister had committed an error concerning this fact.

=== United Kingdom position ===
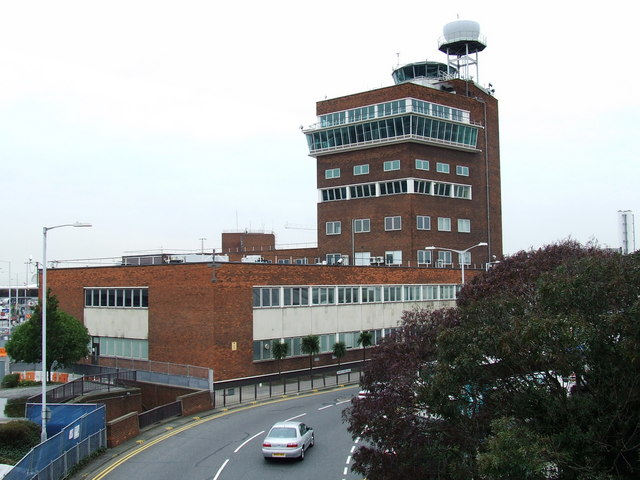
The control tower of London Heathrow Airport in October 2007. A 1980 House of Lords case involved an appellant who had been detained by immigration authorities for gaining entry into the United Kingdom at the airport by deception. The appellant unsuccessfully challenged his detention, the court holding that the authorities' decision did not involve any precedent fact.

Courts in the United Kingdom have stated that the precedent fact doctrine is not applicable to all statutes. In Zamir v. Secretary of State for the Home Department (1980), it was held that the statute in question did not fall into the "precedent fact" category, having regard to the discretionary nature of the power conferred on the public authority. The appellant Zamir, a Pakistani immigrant, was granted an entry certificate to enter the country on the basis that he was unmarried and intending to join his father, who had lived in England since 1962, as a dependent. Less than three months after the issuance of the certificate, the appellant married, and about a month later, in March 1976, he arrived in the UK at London Heathrow Airport and was granted leave by an immigration officer to enter the country for an indefinite period. The officer did not ask if the appellant was married and neither did the appellant volunteer this information. A son was subsequently born in Pakistan to the appellant and his wife, and in 1978 the appellant's wife and son applied for permission to join the appellant in the UK. At that point, the validity of the appellant's entry into the country in 1976 was queried. Following investigations, he was detained with a view to removal from the UK on the ground that he had obtained an entry certificate by deception. His detention was found to be lawful by the Divisional Court and the Court of Appeal. Before the House of Lords, one of the legal issues that arose was the basis for judicial review of the conclusion of the Home Secretary or the immigration officer that the appellant's leave to enter the UK was vitiated by deception.

Counsel for the appellant argued that this was not a case of a decision reviewable on ordinary administrative law grounds, but rather a case where the exercise of the power depended "upon the precedent establishment of an objective fact". However, the House of Lords disagreed with the argument. It held that the nature and process of the decision conferred upon immigration officers was inconsistent with the requirements for the establishment of any precedent facts. This was because the immigration officer had to consider a "complex of statutory rules and non-statutory guidelines and other documentary evidence whose genuineness is doubtful, statements which cannot be verified, misunderstandings as to what was said, practices and attitudes in a foreign state which have to be estimated. There is room for appreciation, even for discretion." On the other hand, the court was not well placed to determine which of several conflicting statements made by the appellant were true, or to decide if other factors were material to the immigration officer's decision. The court had to determine the case based on affidavit evidence and, though cross-examination on such evidence was permissible, this did not usually occur in practice. As the case did not fall into the precedent fact category, the court was unable to judicially review the decision.

The House of Lords modified its holding in Zamir in the later decision Khera v. Secretary of State for Home Department; Khawaja v. Secretary of State for the Home Department ("Khawaja", 1983). The facts of this case, which involved two separate appellants, were similar to those of Zamir. Khera had entered the country by allegedly deceiving a medical officer into thinking he was not married. An answer to the contrary would have precluded him from being given leave to enter the UK. The other appellant, Khawaja, having unsuccessfully applied for a UK visa in Brussels, entered the UK by flying into Manchester, saying he would stay for one week and then return to Brussels to continue his studies. Facts later surfaced proving that, at the time of his entry, contrary to his declaration that he was single, he had been married to a woman who had entered the UK on the same flight but had been attended to by a different immigration officer and was granted indefinite leave to remain in the UK as a returning resident. Both of them were detained as "illegal immigrants".

The House of Lords held that Zamir ought not to be followed as its reasoning would affect the judicial protection of those whose liberty the executive is seeking to interfere with. Lord Fraser of Tullybelton, who was one of the judges hearing the Zamir appeal, said that the case had wrongly stated the court's function as only seeing if there were reasonable grounds for decisions made by the immigration authorities. In his view:

An immigration officer is only entitled to order the detention and removal of a person who has entered the country by virtue of an ex facie valid permission if the person is an illegal entrant. That is a "precedent fact" which has to be established. It is not enough that the immigration officer reasonably believes him to be an illegal entrant if the evidence does not justify his belief. Accordingly, the duty of the court must go beyond inquiring only whether he had reasonable grounds for his belief.

According to Lord Scarman, Zamir limited the scope of judicial review to the Wednesbury principle – in other words, the court will not intervene to quash a decision of a statutory authority unless it can be shown that the authority acted unreasonably. He held that although the principle is correct in appropriate circumstances, "it cannot extend to interference with liberty unless Parliament has unequivocably enacted that it should". He emphasised that if Parliament wished to exclude judicial review of the exercise of a power that restrained liberty, "it must make its meaning crystal clear". On the facts, since Parliament had not clearly expressed any intention to exclude judicial review of discretion exercised by the immigration authorities, the statutory provision in question fell within the precedent fact category. Ultimately, Khera's appeal was allowed as the authorities had not successfully demonstrated that he had obtained permission to enter the UK by deception. Conversely, since Khawaja had clearly deceived an immigration officer concerning his marital status, his appeal was dismissed.

=== Singapore position ===
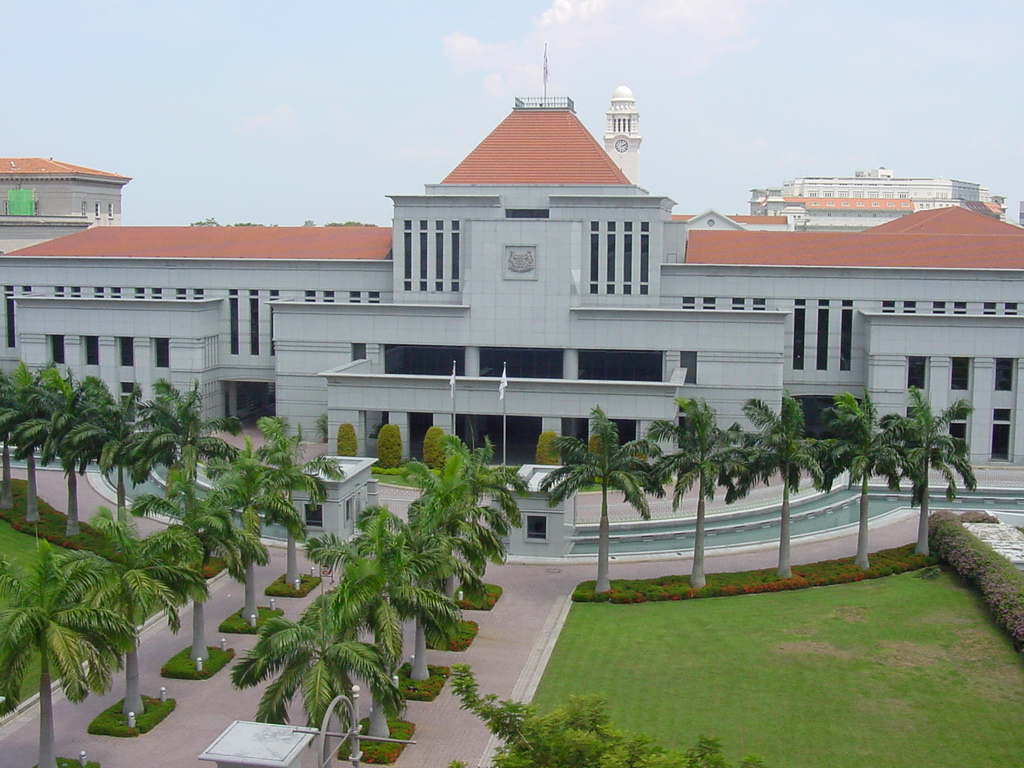
Parliament House in October 2002. In Chng Suan Tze v. Minister for Home Affairs (1988), the Court of Appeal held that sections 8 and 10 of the Internal Security Act did not contain any precedent fact since, by enacting them, Parliament had unambiguously entrusted discretion to the executive.

The courts in Singapore have followed the legal position on errors as to precedent facts in the United Kingdom. This is illustrated by the High Court case Lau Seng Poh v. Controller of Immigration (1985), which held that if a precedent fact is a prerequisite to the exercise of executive power, the court is responsible for deciding if the precedent fact has been satisfied. This principle was affirmed by the Court of Appeal case Chng Suan Tze v. Minister for Home Affairs (1988), which applied the principle set out in Khawaja and its departure from the approach taken in Zamir.

In the case, the Court examined whether it could review the executive's discretionary power under sections 8 and 10 of the Internal Security Act ("ISA"). Section 8 empowers the Minister for Home Affairs to make an order directing that a person be detained without trial if the President is satisfied that detention is necessary to prevent the person from endangering, among other things, the security or public order of Singapore, while section 10 allows the Minister to suspend detention orders and to revoke suspensions as he or she thinks fit.

Delivering the judgment of the Court, Chief Justice Wee Chong Jin held that the scope of judicial review depends on whether a precedent fact is involved. If the discretion falls outside the precedent fact category, the scope of judicial review is limited to the normal judicial review principles of illegality, irrationality (that is, Wednesbury unreasonableness) and procedural impropriety. On the other hand, if one or more precedent facts are involved, the scope of judicial review "extends to deciding whether the evidence justifies the decision". However:

[W]hether a particular discretionary power is subject to any jurisdictional or precedent fact depends on the construction of the legislation which creates that power. A discretionary power may be required to be exercised based on objective facts but Parliament may decide to entrust all relevant decisions of these facts as well as the application to the facts of the relevant rules and any necessary exercise of discretion to the decision maker, in which case the scope of review would be limited to Wednesbury principles. So long as Parliament makes its intention clear, the scope of review would be so limited, even where the liberty of the subject is concerned.

The Court decided that both sections 8 and 10 of the ISA fell outside the precedent fact category. Section 8(1) expressly stated, "in plain and unequivocal terms, that it is for the President to be satisfied that detention is necessary with a view to preventing the detainee from acting in any manner prejudicial to national security and the decision had been entrusted to the President". Similarly, the decision whether there was evidence to revoke an order under section 10 in the public interest had expressly been entrusted to the Minister by the Act. In addition, since the Court was of the view that the judicial process was not suitable for determining issues involving national security, it did not think that Parliament could have intended for a court of law to determine whether, on the evidence, a detainee was likely to pose a security risk. Consequently, the Court could not go beyond determining if the detention decisions violated administrative law rules relating to illegality, irrationality or procedural impropriety.

In contrast, in Fong Thin Choo, the High Court expressed the view that under regulation 12(6) of the Customs Regulations 1979, the fact that goods had not been exported from Singapore was a precedent fact to the customs officer's power to require the owner of the goods to pay customs duty. Therefore, the Court had to decide whether the customs officer's decision was justified by the evidence, and not merely whether there was some evidence on which he could reasonably have reached his decision. However, the Court did not pursue the point since the applicant had not argued the case on this basis.
