= Spokeo, Inc. v. Robins =

- Supreme Court of the United States

Argued November 2, 2015 Decided May 16, 2016
- Full case name: Spokeo, Inc., Petitioner v. Thomas Robins
- Docket no.: 13-1339
- Citations: 578 U.S. 330 (more) 136 S. Ct. 1540; 194 L. Ed. 2d 635
- Argument: Oral argument
- Opinion announcement: Opinion announcement

Case history
- Prior: Finding standing, 742 F.3d 409 (9th Cir. 2014); cert. granted, 135 S. Ct. 1892 (2015).
- Subsequent: Finding standing, 867 F.3d 1108 (9th Cir. 2017); cert. denied, 138 S. Ct. 931 (2018).

Holding
- Because the Ninth Circuit failed to consider both the concrete and particularized aspects of the injury-in-fact requirement, its Article III standing analysis was incomplete.

Court membership
- Chief Justice John Roberts Associate Justices Anthony Kennedy · Clarence Thomas; Ruth Bader Ginsburg · Stephen Breyer; Samuel Alito · Sonia Sotomayor; Elena Kagan

Case opinions
- Majority: Alito, joined by Roberts, Kennedy, Thomas, Breyer, Kagan
- Concurrence: Thomas
- Dissent: Ginsburg, joined by Sotomayor

Laws applied
- Fair Credit Reporting Act, 15 U.S.C. § 1681 et seq.

Spokeo, Inc. v. Robins, 578 U.S. 330 (2016), was a United States Supreme Court case in which the Court vacated and remanded a ruling by United States Court of Appeals for the Ninth Circuit on the basis that the Ninth Circuit had not properly determined whether the plaintiff has suffered an "injury-in-fact" when analyzing whether he had standing to bring his case in federal court. The Court did not discuss whether "the Ninth Circuit’s ultimate conclusion — that Robins adequately alleged an injury in fact — was correct."

== Background ==
Spokeo, Inc. operates a .com website featuring a "people search engine" with which its users can obtain in-depth consumer reports on individual persons. In 2010, a class action law firm sued Spokeo in the United States District Court for the Central District of California, alleging violations of the Fair Credit Reporting Act (FCRA). Thomas Robins, the named plaintiff, alleged that he was unemployed while Spokeo's profile of him falsely stated that he worked in a professional field, had a graduate degree, was a married parent, had a high level of wealth, and included a false age and profile photograph. In January 2011, Judge Otis D. Wright II dismissed the initial complaint for not alleging "any actual or imminent harm" after which Robins amended his complaint to allege employment, stress and anxiety injuries. In May 2011, Judge Wright found Robins had alleged a valid injury-in-fact before then reversing himself and dismissing the case for lack of standing after Spokeo filed for an appeal.

In June 2012, Spokeo agreed to pay $800,000 to settle a separate FCRA based lawsuit filed by the Federal Trade Commission.

In February 2014, a unanimous panel of the United States Court of Appeals for the Ninth Circuit reversed Judge Wright's dismissal and remanded the case. Judge Diarmuid O'Scannlain, joined by Judges Susan P. Graber and Carlos Bea, reasoned that Robins had alleged injuries sufficient to establish standing because FCRA protected individual, rather than collective, rights and Robins was suing for a violation of his own statutory rights. In a footnote, the Circuit explicitly found it did not need to reach Robins' additional allegations regarding injuries to his employment prospects or from anxiety.

The Supreme Court of the United States granted Spokeo's petition for a writ of certiorari and one-hour of oral arguments were heard on November 2, 2015, where Deputy U.S. Solicitor General Malcom Stewart appeared for the government as a friend in support of Robins.

== Opinion of the Court ==
On May 16, 2016, the Supreme Court delivered judgment in favor of Spokeo, vacating and remanding by a vote of 6–2. Justice Samuel Alito, joined by Chief Justice John Roberts, as well as Justices Anthony Kennedy, Clarence Thomas, Stephen Breyer, and Elena Kagan, wrote that the circuit below had failed to establish that Robins had standing to file the lawsuit under Article Three of the United States Constitution.

The Court first explained that the Constitution's Case or Controversy Clause requires any plaintiff to allege an injury-in-fact that is "concrete and particularized". The Court stated Congress cannot eliminate the injury-in-fact requirement simply by granting a statutory right to sue.

While the Ninth Circuit identified particular harms to Robins, it erred, according to the Court, by not also determining that those harms were "concrete". Although intangible harms such as risk can be concrete, the Court clarified, "bare procedural violations" cannot. The Court remanded the case while taking "no position as to whether the Ninth Circuit’s ultimate conclusion— that Robins adequately alleged an injury in fact— was correct."

=== Justice Thomas' concurrence ===
Justice Clarence Thomas added a concurrence, alone. He wrote separately to describe his belief that the Constitution's Case or Controversy requirement is founded upon the common law distinction between private rights and public rights as articulated by William Blackstone.

=== Justice Ginsburg's dissent ===
Justice Ruth Bader Ginsburg, joined by Sonia Sotomayor, dissented. Justice Ginsburg wrote that she agreed with much of the Court's opinion but saw "no utility" in remanding the case back to the Ninth Circuit. Justice Ginsburg saw the many inaccuracies published by Spokeo as concretely harming Robins and, as such, she would have simply affirmed.

== Subsequent developments ==
On August 15, 2017, the Ninth Circuit again allowed Robins' lawsuit to proceed. Judge O'Scannlain, joined by the same judges as before, now found that Robins had alleged a sufficiently concrete harm to establish an injury-in-fact under the Constitution. Relying on an amicus curiae brief filed by the Consumer Financial Protection Bureau in support of Robins, Judge O'Scannlain determined that publishing even flattering inaccuracies could harm a job seeker. Spokeo again petitioned the Supreme Court for a writ of certiorari, but this was denied.

The case was settled through mediation in March 2019.

== See also ==
- List of United States Supreme Court cases
- Lists of United States Supreme Court cases by volume
- List of United States Supreme Court cases by the Roberts Court
