= Threshold issues in Singapore administrative law =

Legal requirements to be satisfied to bring cases to the High Court

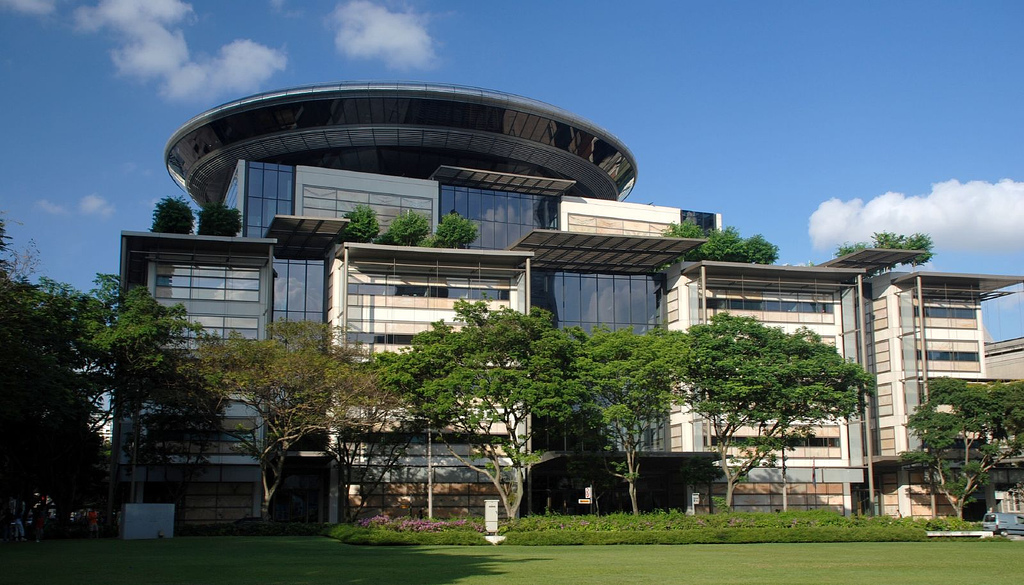
The Supreme Court of Singapore. Before the High Court, which is the lower division of the Supreme Court, will judicially review the act or decision of a public authority, the applicant must satisfy various threshold issues.

Threshold issues are legal requirements in Singapore administrative law that must be satisfied by applicants before their claims for judicial review of acts or decisions of public authorities can be dealt with by the High Court. These include showing that they have standing (locus standi) to bring cases, and that the matters are amenable to judicial review and justiciable by the Court.

Depending on the interest that the applicant seeks to represent, standing can be categorized as either private or public standing. Applicants must establish they have private standing if they seek to represent personal interests. In contrast, applicants who seek to represent the interests of a larger group or the public at large must establish public or representative standing. Where private standing is concerned, the Singapore courts have not yet directly addressed the issue of the standing required to obtain a declaration in an administrative law case, but where constitutional claims are concerned the Court of Appeal held that three elements must exist: (1) the applicant must have a real interest in bringing the case, (2) there must be a real controversy between the parties to the case, and (3) a personal right possessed by the applicant must have been violated. The Court also suggested that the same test applied to applications for prerogative orders. The legal position on public standing in administrative law cases is indeterminate as, to date, no applicant has sought to rely on public standing to obtain leave for judicial review. In constitutional law cases, the Court has drawn a distinction between public and private rights, and held that people will not have standing to vindicate public rights unless they have suffered special damage and have genuine private interests to protect or further.

For a decision by a body to be amenable to judicial review, United Kingdom and Singapore law requires the decision to have some public element, and not to relate exclusively to private law matters. The public element is determined by considering if the body's power stems from a legal source (the "source test"), or if the nature of the body is that it is carrying out some public function (the "nature test"). If the power exercised by a body has a legislative source, it will ordinarily be amenable to judicial review in the absence of compelling reasons to the contrary, but this is not an invariable rule and decisions without a sufficient public element will not be amenable to review. The latter is also the result when a body is regarded as having acted pursuant to a contract between it and the aggrieved party, rather than having exercised its statutory powers.

The subject-matter of a dispute must be justiciable before the High Court will hear the case. A decision by an executive authority will generally be considered non-justiciable if the decision requires the intricate balancing of various competing policy considerations, and judges are ill-equipped to decide the case because of their limited training, experience and access to materials; if a judicial pronouncement could embarrass another branch of government or tie its hands in the conduct of affairs traditionally falling within its purview; or if the decision involves the exercise of a prerogative power that the democratically elected branches are entrusted to take care of. Nonetheless, a dispute may prima facie involve a non-justiciable area but the courts may decide that there is a justiciable matter within it, or the courts may be able to isolate a pure question of law from what is seemingly a non-justiciable issue. Because of the principle that all powers have legal limits, the Attorney-General's exercise of prosecutorial discretion and the power to pardon or grant clemency to convicted persons exercised by the President on the Cabinet's advice are both justiciable in exceptional cases, for instance, where the powers have been exercised unconstitutionally or in bad faith.

== Introduction ==
Before an administrative law claim can be heard on the merits by the High Court, the applicant must satisfy a number of legal requirements which may be called "threshold issues". These include showing that he or she has standing (locus standi) to bring the case, and that the matter is amenable to judicial review and justiciable by the Court.

== Standing ==
Standing, or locus standi (Latin for "a place to stand"), is a threshold requirement that an applicant must satisfy before a court will permit him or her to proceed with a claim for judicial review. Depending on the facts of the case, the applicant has to establish one of the two categories of standing. The applicant seeks to establish private standing when he or she purports to represent his or her own interests. In contrast, the applicant seeks to establish public or representative standing when he or she purports to represent the interests of a larger group of people, or the public at large. Standing is a mixed question of fact and law, which the court determines based on legal principles.

The doctrine of standing prevents applicants from burdening the court with frivolous or vexatious claims. This minimizes disruption in the administrative process. When an administrative decision by a public authority is challenged, implementation of the decision by the authority may be delayed. Therefore, the courts want to restrict access to applicants who have a genuine interest in challenging the decision. Furthermore, since the courts' resources are limited, restricting access to genuine claims ensures that judicial resources are appropriately allocated.

=== Private standing ===
==== Declarations ====
One of the remedies that may be sought by an applicant for judicial review is a declaration, which is a pronouncement by a court stating the legal position between the parties to an action, based on the facts that have been presented to the court. The Singapore courts have not yet directly addressed the issue of the standing required to apply for a declaration in an administrative law case, but it is possible they may adopt the test laid down in constitutional law cases. In Tan Eng Hong v. Attorney-General (2012), the Court of Appeal held that three elements must exist for a person have standing to bring a constitutional challenge: (1) he or she must have a real interest in bringing the case, (2) there must be a real controversy between the parties to the case, and (3) a personal right possessed by the applicant must have been violated.

==== Prerogative orders ====
In Singapore, an applicant must have a "sufficient interest" in the subject of the application to have standing to apply for a prerogative order, that is, a mandatory, prohibiting or quashing order. Previously, the rule of standing for mandatory orders was stricter than the rule applicable to prohibiting and quashing orders. To apply for a mandatory order, an applicant had to show a specific legal right in the matter. In contrast, an applicant only had to show that "there had been an abuse of power which inconvenienced someone" to apply for a prohibiting or quashing order. This rule of standing for prohibiting and quashing orders was relatively easy to satisfy because such orders were often used to ensure good standards of public administration.

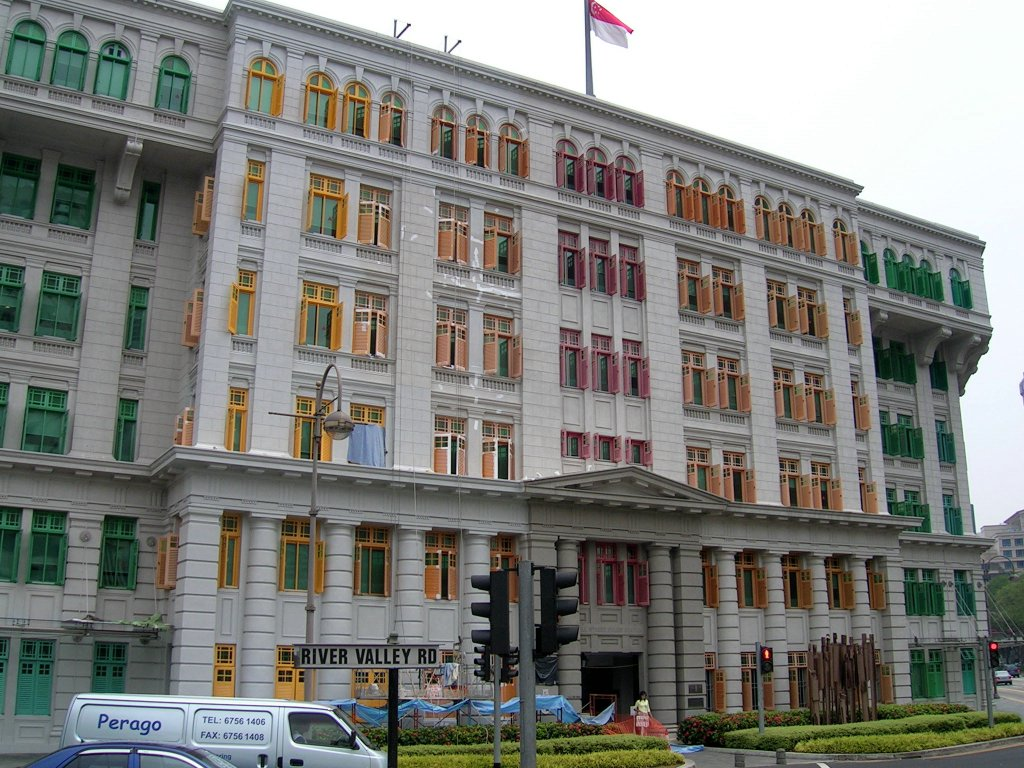
The headquarters of the Ministry of Information and the Arts (MITA; now known as the Ministry of Communications and Information). In a 1995 case involving the Minister, the High Court held that the test for standing for all prerogative orders is that of sufficient interest.

However, the United Kingdom courts gradually adopted a single sufficient interest test for all prerogative orders. In R. v. Commissioners of Customs and Excise, ex parte Cook (1969), for example, the High Court used a sufficient interest test to determine whether an applicant had standing to apply for a mandatory order. Singapore followed the UK's move towards a uniform test for all prerogative orders. In Re Lim Chor Pee, ex parte Law Society of Singapore (1986), the Court of Appeal endorsed the sufficient interest test for mandatory orders. In that case, the Law Society of Singapore had applied for a mandamus (now known as a mandatory order) to ensure that the Disciplinary Committee heard and investigated all six charges levied against an advocate and solicitor. The Court, applying the decision of the House of Lords in R. v. Inland Revenue Commissioners, ex parte National Federation of Self-Employed and Small Businesses Ltd. (1981), held that the test for standing was whether the applicant had a sufficient interest in the subject matter, and not whether he or she had a specific legal right.

In Chan Hiang Leng Colin v. Minister for Information and the Arts (1995), which was a constitutional challenge rather than an administrative law claim, the High Court noted that the sufficient interest test for standing applies to mandatory, prohibiting and quashing orders. It also held that the sufficiency of the applicant's interest should be judged in relation to the subject matter of the application. On the other hand, when the case came before the Court of Appeal in Chan Hiang Leng Colin v. Minister for Information and the Arts (1996), that court held:

If a constitutional guarantee is to mean anything, it must mean that any citizen can complain to the courts if there is a violation of it. ... A citizen should not have to wait until he is prosecuted before he may assert his constitutional rights. ... If a citizen does not have sufficient interest to see that his constitutional rights are not violated, then it is hard to see who has.

In Tan Eng Hong, the Court of Appeal stated that the same test for standing applies to both declarations and prerogative orders, and read the statements from Chan Hiang Leng Colin quoted above as an implicit acceptance that an applicant must demonstrate the violation of a right personal to him or her to have standing.

The Chief Justice of Singapore, Chan Sek Keong, suggested extrajudicially during a 2010 lecture that Singapore courts may not apply the sufficient interest test with the same rigour as the UK courts. A more stringent application of the sufficient interest test would be in line with the green-light approach that the courts adopt in administrative law. Under this approach, the Government commits itself to good administrative practices while the courts play a supporting role by articulating clear rules for the executive to adhere to. Accordingly, the courts may adopt a more discriminating standing test to discourage litigation that will unnecessarily curtail the executive's ability to carry out good governance.

=== Public standing ===
Public or representative standing is standing possessed by an applicant who brings a case on behalf of a larger group of people, or even in the interest of the general public. The applicant need not show that a personal right or interest has been infringed. As long as the represented individuals have, or the public has, sufficient interest in the matter, the applicant will be held to have adequate standing to pursue the case.

Whether public standing ought to be accorded at all has been a subject of considerable academic and judicial controversy. It has been regarded by one academic commentator as the litmus test of how liberal the standing rules within a legal regime are. Common justifications for allowing this form of standing include the need to vindicate the rule of law and the need to challenge particularly serious illegality where no individual is peculiarly affected by it. Political accountability alone is said not to serve as a sufficient check on administrative action, and there would be a "grave lacuna in the law" if no one has sufficient standing to challenge such action before the courts.

On the other hand, proponents of a more "closed" and restrictive system of rules of standing point towards the need for increased certainty in the law, as well as the possibility of abuse of process and the conventional argument that there will be an unstoppable flood of litigation. Additionally, it is argued that allowing more applications by persons with weak claims to standing may curtail the efficiency of the executive in practising good governance, as resources would have to be channelled to defending lawsuits. It may also delay the implementation of administrative decisions, potentially resulting in substantial damage to stakeholders involved.

==== Position in the United Kingdom ====
Cases in the United Kingdom were previously inconsistent upon the issue of permitting representative standing. Nevertheless, it may now be confidently said that the UK courts recognize, in principle, the doctrine of representative standing, and will apply it in suitable cases.

===== Narrow approach =====
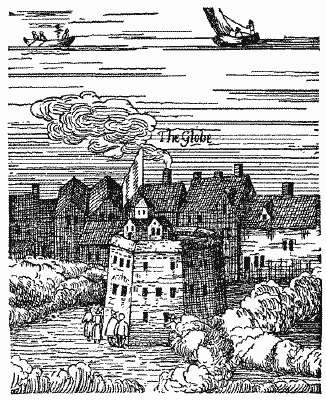
A drawing of The Rose theatre (mislabelled "The Globe") from Claes Visscher's panorama of London (1616). The High Court of England and Wales took a narrow approach to standing in a 1989 case brought by a trust company interested in preserving the theatre's remains.

In R. v. Secretary of State for the Environment, ex parte Rose Theatre Trust Co. (1989), the High Court of England and Wales adopted a narrow and more restrictive approach to public standing. Justice Konrad Schiemann held that to have standing, an applicant must expressly or impliedly have "a greater right or expectation than any other citizen of this country to have that decision taken lawfully". On the facts, an individual interested in seeing the remains of a historically significant theatre in London called The Rose preserved and made accessible to the public lacked sufficient interest to challenge the Secretary of State for the Environment's decision not to list the theatre as a protected monument under the Ancient Monuments and Archaeological Areas Act 1979. The applicant, a trust company formed by a number of such people, did not have any greater claim to standing than its individual members. Despite the fact that this decision could potentially leave an unlawful act by a minister unrebuked, the judge considered that:

... the law does not see it as a function of the courts to be there for every individual who is interested in having the legality of an administrative decision litigated. Parliament could have given such a wide right of access to the court but it has not done so. ... We all expect our decision makers to act lawfully. We are not all given by Parliament the right to apply for judicial review.

In the event that a person lacks standing, there is a possibility that he or she may be able to ask the Attorney-General to allow him or her to bring a relator action. In this scenario, the Attorney-General would be the nominal plaintiff in the judicial review proceedings, but the case would actually be conducted by the individual. Bringing a relator action is one means of circumventing the requirement of standing on the part of the individual applicant, because the Attorney-General has an interest in upholding the law for the public benefit.

However, the Attorney-General may not consent to lend his name to a relator action. This matter lies entirely within his discretion, and his decision is not considered reviewable by the courts. In addition, it has been forcefully argued that since the Attorney-General is the principal legal advisor of the executive, it is overly idealistic to expect his consent to an action against the Government. This makes a relator action an uncertain, and hence an unsatisfactory, means of obtaining relief.

===== Broad approach =====
In the United Kingdom at present, the mainstream approach towards representative standing is broad and liberal. The focus is on whether illegality or some other ground of review can be shown, rather than the applicant's relationship to the illegality complained of. If some unlawfulness can be demonstrated, the courts tend to grant a remedy even where the applicant is not directly affected by the executive decision.

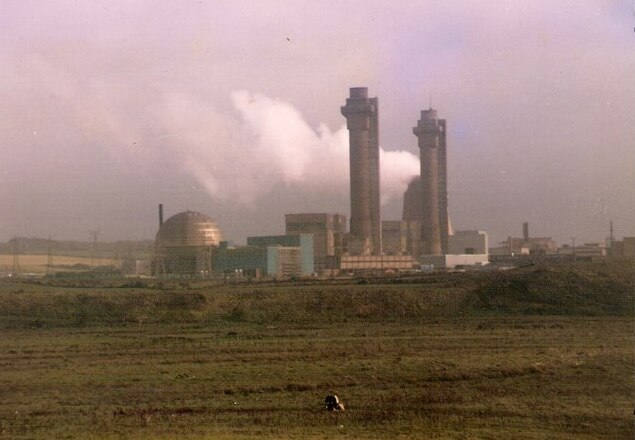
Sellafield nuclear reprocessing site in Cumbria, England. In a 1993 case, the High Court of England and Wales found that the environmental campaign group Greenpeace had standing to apply for judicial review of a decision involving a nuclear power plant at Sellafield.

In R. v. Inspectorate of Pollution, ex parte Greenpeace (No. 2) (1993), representative standing was accorded to the environmental campaign group Greenpeace that had challenged a decision about the terms on which the authorities allowed a company to test a nuclear power plant at Sellafield in Cumbria, England. Justice Philip Otton considered that Greenpeace had sufficient representative standing:

The fact that there are 400,000 supporters in the United Kingdom carries less weight than the fact that 2,500 of them come from the Cumbria region. I would be ignoring the blindingly obvious if I were to disregard the fact that those persons are inevitably concerned about (and have a genuine perception that there is) a danger to their health and safety from any additional discharge of radioactive waste even from testing. I have no doubt that the issues raised by this application are serious and worthy of determination by this court.

The high-water mark of according representative standing can be found in R. v. Secretary of State for Foreign and Commonwealth Affairs, ex parte World Development Movement Ltd. (1994). In this case the applicant, a non-partisan pressure group called the World Development Movement, challenged the decision of the Secretary of State for Foreign and Commonwealth Affairs to award a grant under the Overseas Development and Co-operation Act 1980 on the basis that it was ultra vires and a misuse of public funds. Representative standing was accorded despite the contention that, unlike Greenpeace, neither the applicant nor its members had any direct personal interest in the case, and were merely seeking to act in the interest of potential overseas aid recipients. In giving his judgment, Lord Justice of Appeal Christopher Rose identified the following factors as relevant to ascertaining whether representative standing should be accorded:

- The importance of vindicating the rule of law.
- The importance of the issue raised.
- The likely absence of any responsible challenger.
- The nature of the breach of duty against which relief is sought.
- The role of the applicants in giving advice, guidance and assistance with regards to the subject matter of the dispute.

In addition, it also appears that an applicant's subjective motivation is relevant to whether he or she should be recognized as having public standing. If a case is brought out of ill-will or some other improper purpose, the courts will be reluctant to recognize that the applicant has standing, even if there is a public interest in the case being heard.

Peter Cane has distinguished between cases where the courts have found that an applicant has standing to represent identifiable individuals (associational standing), and cases where the applicant purports to represent the public interest (public interest standing). Under this analysis, ex parte Greenpeace may be regarded as an example of the former, and ex parte World Development Movement the latter. In 1994, the Law Commission recommended that there should be a two-track system for standing. An applicant should have standing in one of two situations: either in his or her personal capacity, in which case a remedy lies ex debito justitae ("from a debt of justice", that is, as a matter of right); or at the discretion of the court if it considers that it is in the public interest to accord standing.

==== Position in Singapore ====
No Singapore cases have yet recognized the standing of applicants who have had no direct personal interest in the subject-matter being litigated. In Chan Hiang Leng Colin, the High Court appeared to accept in theory that every citizen prima facie has the right to apply for mandatory, prohibiting or quashing orders in order to prevent an abuse of power by a public authority, though the Court has discretion to refuse to grant them. In doing so, the applicant may claim to be regarded as a public benefactor, rather than a meddlesome busybody. This seems to support the proposition that a citizen may bring a suit even where he or she has no direct interest in the subject matter of litigation. The court has discretion to accord him or her standing if it considers it in the public interest to do so. Justice Judith Prakash cited the following comments of Lord Justice Hubert Parker in R. v. Thames Magistrates' Court, ex parte Greenbaum (1957) regarding quashing orders:

Anybody can apply for it – a member of the public who has been inconvenienced, or a particular party or person who has a particular grievance of his own. If the application is made by what for convenience one may call a stranger, the remedy is purely discretionary. Where, however, it is made by a person who has a particular grievance of his own whether as a party or otherwise, then the remedy lies ex debito justitiae ...

She added: "It was not necessary that the applicant had to have a particular grievance arising out of the order complained about. It was sufficient that there had been an abuse of power which inconvenienced someone."

On the other hand, in Tan Eng Hong the Court of Appeal drew a distinction between public rights which are "held and vindicated by public authorities" and a private right which is "held and vindicated by a private individual". It took the view that "[i]f a public right was involved, the applicant must show that he had suffered special damage as a result of the public act being challenged and that he had a genuine private interest to protect or further". Relying on this, in Jeyaretnam Kenneth Andrew v. Attorney-General (2012) the High Court held that the applicant, who was an ordinary citizen, had no standing to challenge the constitutionality of a contingent loan of US$4 billion offered by the Monetary Authority of Singapore to the International Monetary Fund to assist the latter in dealing with an ongoing financial crisis and to promote global economic and financial stability. Such a restrictive approach to standing is consistent with the green-light approach to administrative law adopted by the Singapore courts.

== Amenability ==
For a decision by a body to be amenable to judicial review, United Kingdom and Singapore law requires the decision to have some public element, and not to relate exclusively to private law matters. The public element is determined by considering if the body's power stems from a legal source (the "source test"), or if the nature of the body is that it is carrying out some public function (the "nature test").

There is much debate whether a public–private divide in administrative law is necessary. It has been contended that such a division has "turned the law in the wrong direction, away from flexibility of procedure and towards a rigidity reminiscent of the bad old days ...". Peter Leyland and Gordon Anthony have suggested that a more desirable alternative presents itself in Northern Ireland, where the test for amenability to review is dependent on the "public interest" in the issue. Thus, the public–private divide does not function at the expense of the legitimate interests of individuals.

=== Decisions with a public element ===
==== Position in the United Kingdom ====
In Council of Civil Service Unions v. Minister for the Civil Service (1983), Lord Diplock stated that for a decision to be susceptible to judicial review, the decision-maker must be empowered by public law, and the ultimate source of power is nearly always a statute or subordinate legislation. However, this "source test" ignores many situations where decisions are not dependent on legal rules laid down by the State. This has become an increasing worry in the modern polity as more privatized utilities and private bodies perform governmental functions that could potentially escape any form of scrutiny.

This has led to the development of the "nature test". In R. v. Panel on Take-overs and Mergers, ex parte Datafin plc. (1986), In this case, the issue was whether a body discharging functions that are quasi-judicial in nature and which wields considerable de facto public powers is amenable to judicial review. The Panel on Take-overs and Mergers is an unincorporated association and does not derive its power directly from a legal source such as legislation. Rather, it is an informal body which has adopted a self-regulatory code to govern its members. However, Sir John Donaldson, the Master of the Rolls, observed that the Panel possesses "immense power de facto by devising, promulgating, amending and interpreting the City Code on Take-overs and Mergers" and its decisions could lead to sanctions which indirectly affect the rights of citizens. Lord Justice Timothy Lloyd acknowledged that the source test is usually decisive, but disagreed that it is the sole test to determine whether a public body is subject to judicial review. He explained that it is instead helpful to look at the nature of the power – whether the body in question exercises public law functions or if the exercise of its functions has public law consequences.

There remains some uncertainty whether the source test or nature test ought to be the determining test. It appears, though, that the impact of Datafin remains qualified in the light of other decisions where the source of the power was held to be the determining factor. It is also worth noting that the effect of the nature test is greatly restricted in practice due to the insistence on the difference between contractual and governmental powers. Where there is a contractual relationship between an aggrieved person and the body making a decision affecting the person, this tends to place the dispute on the private law side of the public–private divide, making the decision not amenable to judicial review.

==== Position in Singapore ====
Similar to the United Kingdom's position, judicial review in Singapore is confined to matters of public law, and the applicable tests are the source test and nature test. The Datafin decision was applied by the Singapore Court of Appeal in Public Service Commission v. Lai Swee Lin Linda (2001), where the respondent, an employee with the Land Office, had the probationary period of her employment extended without prior warning. Her employment contract was later terminated. She complained to various statutory bodies, and ultimately to the Public Service Commission ("PSC"), but was unsuccessful in having her employment reinstated. She then sought leave from the High Court to apply for judicial review against the PSC. In the course of its judgment, the Court of Appeal accepted that the source test is one of the tests that can be relied on to determine whether a decision by a body is amenable to judicial review. In addition, it noted that Datafin had held that the source test is not the only applicable test. However, the Court did not embark on a discussion of the nature test because it found that when the respondent's employer had made the decisions concerning her employment, it had acted pursuant to her contractual terms of service and had not exercised its statutory powers. Thus, the decisions were not susceptible to judicial review. It did not invariably follow that when a statutory body makes a decision it is exercising a statutory power.

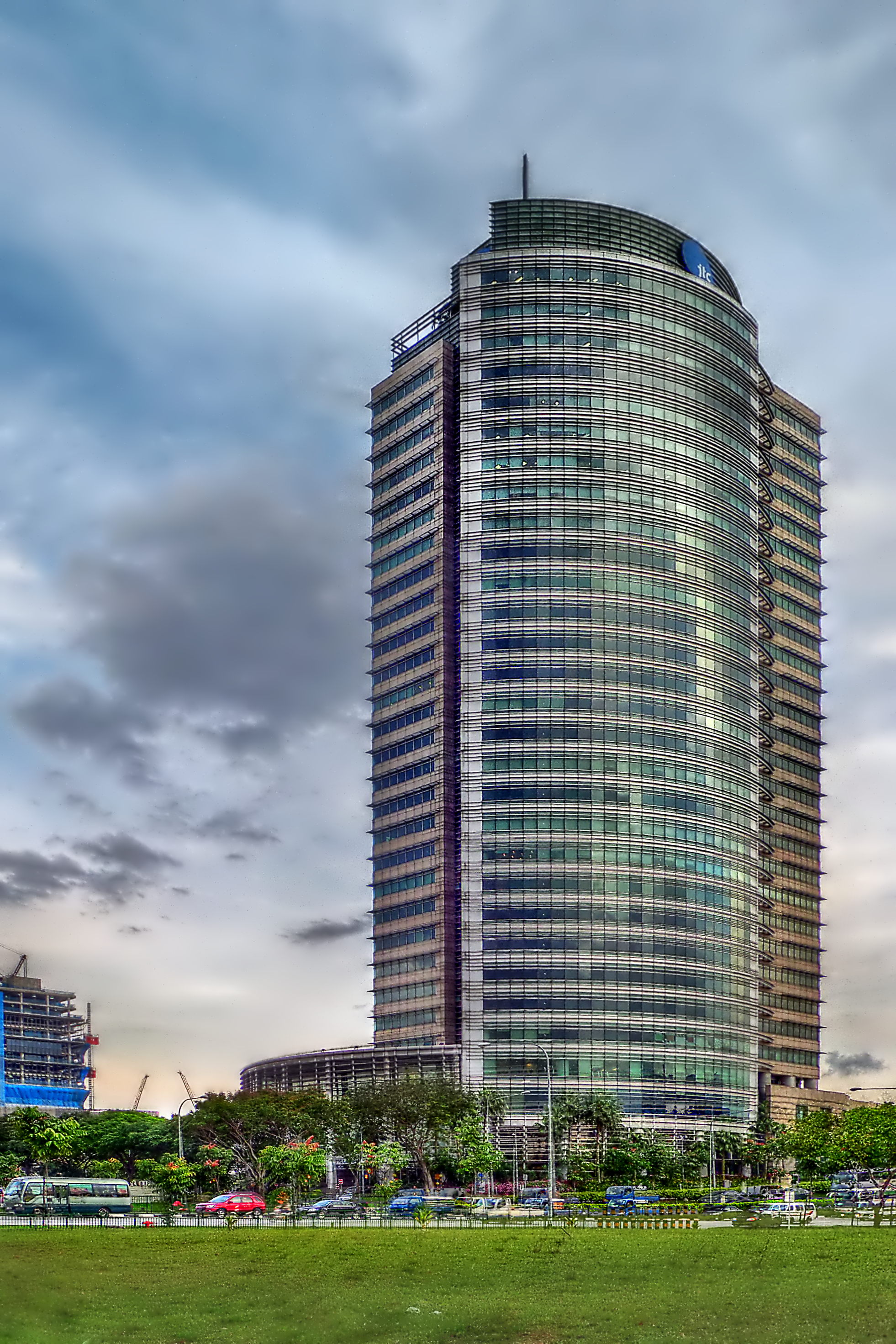
JTC Summit, the headquarters of JTC Corporation which was formerly known as the Jurong Town Corporation. A 2011 case of the High Court against the JTC held that both the source and nature tests apply in Singapore to determine if a body's decision is amenable to judicial review.

In UDL Marine (Singapore) Pte. Ltd. v. Jurong Town Corp. (2011), Lai Swee Lin Linda was acknowledged to be the leading authority in Singapore on determining the amenability to judicial review. The High Court said that both the source test and nature test applied in Singapore. In the case, the Jurong Town Corporation ("JTC") had leased land to UDL Marine and had declined to renew the lease after its term expired. UDL Marine challenged this decision. The Court held that even though the Jurong Town Corporation Act conferred on JTC the power to lease land, it did not prescribe the terms on which JTC could lease land and the considerations to be taken into account. JTC's exercise of power to lease land was a private act as it "was not something a private individual would not be capable of doing". The Court added that even though there was an element of public interest, JTC's decisions had not been "sufficiently of a public nature". In granting and renewing leases, it had been acting just like a private landlord.

In the case of Yeap Wai Kong v. Singapore Exchange Securities Trading Ltd. (2012), the High Court identified various factors to determine if the decision by Singapore Exchange Securities Trading Ltd. ("SGX-ST") to reprimand a director of a company listed on the Singapore Exchange was properly characterized as a public function. These factors include the extent to which the SGX-ST is interwoven into the legislative and regulatory matrix, whether the reprimand function has a statutory underpinning, and the nature of the reprimand function. Even though the SGX-ST is not a statutory board, it is an approved exchange under section 16 of the Securities and Futures Act, which provides that it must take into account the interests of both the investing and general public when discharging its obligations. Also, SGX-ST is a vital part of the institutional ecosystem of Singapore's financial sector. Its function to publicly reprimand a listed company's director may potentially result in adverse implications on the company's business reputation and the director's continued service on board committees and directorships of other listed companies. For these reasons, the nature test was satisfied.

The Court of Appeal clarified in Manjit Singh s/o Kirpal Singh v. Attorney-General (2013) that if the power exercised by a body has a legislative source, this will "ordinarily mean that it is amenable to judicial review in the absence of compelling reasons to the contrary". However, this is not an invariable rule, and there are situations in which a statutory power is not amenable to judicial review. Examples of these include the powers and duties conferred or imposed on corporations by the Companies Act, and on trustees by the Trustees Act. The Court cited with approval the following passage from R. (Beer (trading as Hammer Trout Farm)) v. Hampshire Farmers' Markets Ltd. (2003):

It seems to me that the law has now been developed to the point where, unless the source of power clearly provides the answer, the question whether the decision of a body is amenable to judicial review requires a careful consideration of the nature of the power and function that has been exercised to see whether the decision has a sufficient public element, flavour or character to bring it within the purview of public law. It may be said with some justification that this criterion for amenability is very broad, not to say question-begging. But it provides the framework for the investigation that has to be conducted. ... [Emphasis added.]

However, the Court also said: "Where there is a compelling reason which indicates the absence of such a public element in what is nonetheless a statutory power or duty, there would be no good reason to subject the exercise of such a power or duty, which may already be governed by private law obligations and remedies, to public law remedies in judicial review proceedings." [Emphasis added.]

It has been suggested that the Court of Appeal's judgment can be interpreted in one of two ways: that the exercise of a power is not amenable to judicial review either if it has no public element altogether, or if it has an insufficient public element. Neither of these interpretations is without complications. As regards the first interpretation, it may be difficult to conceive of an exercise of statutory power that has no public element at all. If the second interpretation is correct, there is doubt as to the level of sufficiency required for the exercise of a power to be amenable to judicial review as the Court did not explain this.

==== Exceptions ====
===== Decisions relating to the internal procedures of Parliament =====
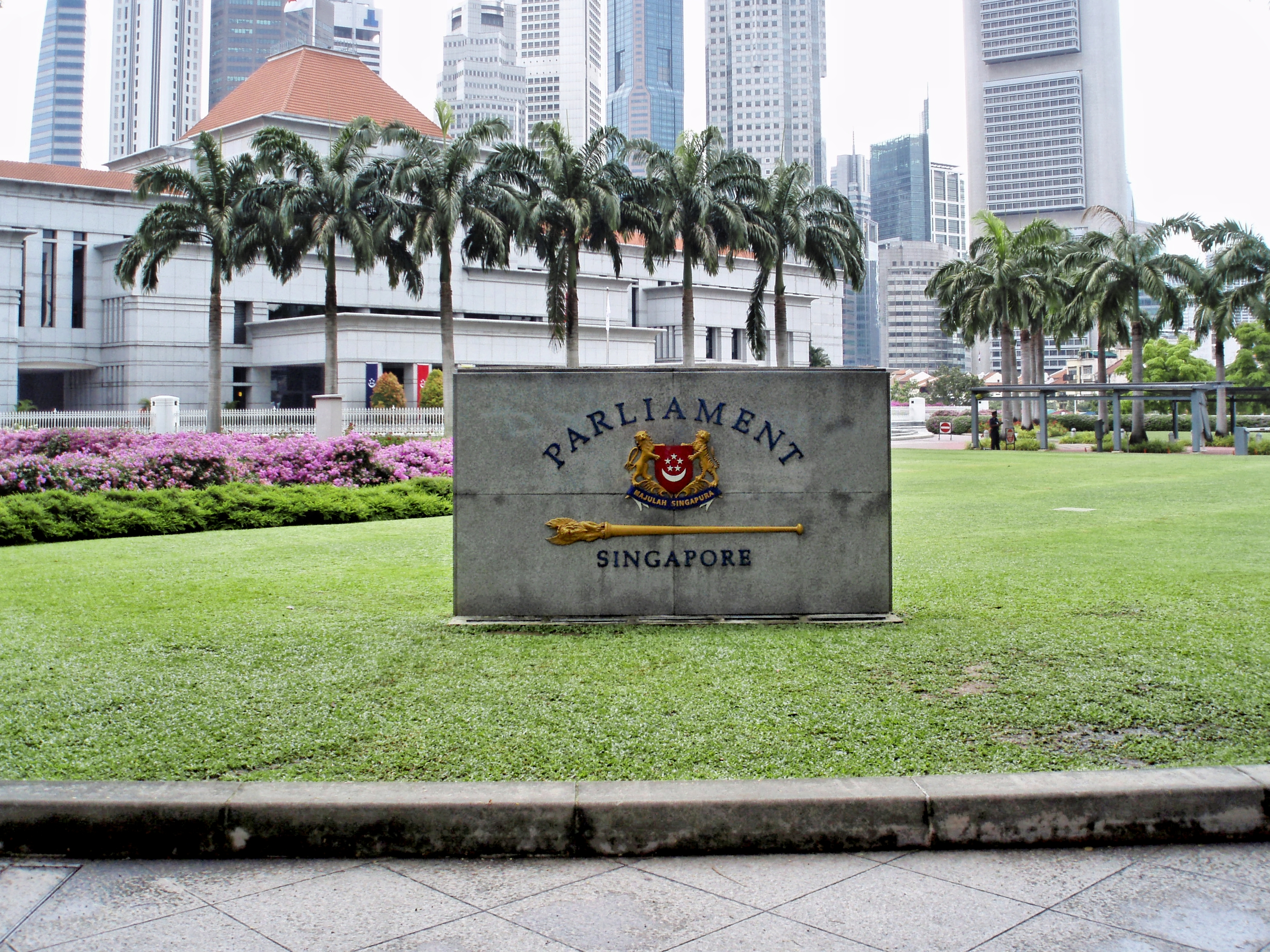
Parliament House, Singapore. Decisions made by Parliament are generally not amenable to judicial review.

It is clearly established that the courts exercise a self-denying ordinance in relation to interfering with the proceedings of Parliament. Section 5 of the Parliament (Privileges, Immunities and Powers) Act states:

There shall be freedom of speech and debate and proceedings in Parliament, and such freedom of speech and debate and proceedings shall not be liable to be impeached or questioned in any court, commission of inquiry, committee of inquiry, tribunal or any other place whatsoever out of Parliament.

Section 5 is based on Article 9 of the United Kingdom's Bill of Rights 1689: "[T]he Freedome of Speech and Debates or Proceedings in Parlyament ought not to be impeached or questioned in any Court or Place out of Parlyament." On the basis of this provision, and for other reasons, a long line of authorities in the Commonwealth have held that courts are precluded from impeaching or questioning the freedom of speech and debates or proceedings in Parliament. This is so even if the legal action is brought by, and not against, a member of the legislature. Immunity also extends to independent persons appointed by Parliament exercising their duties in relation to Parliament's activities. In Prebble v. Television New Zealand Ltd. (1994), the Privy Council held that if any exceptions were made unless in the most extreme circumstances, members of the legislature would not know if there would subsequently be challenges to what they are saying in Parliament. Therefore, members would not have the confidence to state fully and freely what they have to say.

The Privy Council identified one of the extreme circumstances as that which occurred in Wright & Advertiser Newspapers Limited v. Lewis (1990). In this case, the Supreme Court of South Australia held that an action may proceed against a legislator accused of libel where the whole subject matter of the alleged libel relates to the legislator's conduct in the legislature so that the effect of parliamentary privilege is to exclude virtually all the evidence necessary to justify the libel. If such an action is not allowed to proceed, not only will there be injustice to the defendant, but there will also be a real danger that the media will be forced to abstain from the truthful disclosure of the legislator's misbehaviour in Parliament. This would be a most serious inroad into freedom of speech since justification would be impossible.

===== Decisions of the High Court and Court of Appeal =====
While the High Court has inherent power to judicially review the decisions of inferior courts and other administrative bodies, one High Court judge may not judicially review a decision of another High Court judge, nor may the High Court judicially review decisions of the Court of Appeal.

The Court of Appeal does not possess the jurisdiction and power to entertain applications for supervision of a decision made by a Subordinate Court as it has "no jurisdiction or power to hear any proceeding other than an appeal against a decision made by the High Court in the exercise of its original jurisdiction". Neither may the Court judicially review High Court decisions. This is because the Court of Appeal is a statutory creation, and section 3(b) of the Supreme Court of Judicature Act states that it exercises only "appellate civil and criminal jurisdiction".

===== Issues over which judicial review has been excluded =====
Even when a decision made by a body possesses some public element, judicial review of the decision may be ousted where a statute expressly excludes the court's power to review administrative decisions. However, the effectiveness of an ouster clause depends on the facts of each individual case. Examples of statutory ouster clauses in Singapore are section 8B(2) of the Internal Security Act, and section 47 of the Industrial Relations Act. The latter provision stipulates that any determination by the Industrial Arbitration Court is "final and conclusive" and "shall not be subject to any Quashing Order, Prohibiting Order, Mandatory Order or injunction in any court on any account".

===== Decisions without legal effect =====
It has been held in Singapore that decisions by a public authority without any legal effect are not amenable to judicial review. In Tan Eng Chye v. Director of Prisons (2004), a case concerning an application for an order of certiorari to quash the certification by a prison medical officer that the applicant was fit to undergo a caning punishment, the High Court held that not every act of or conduct by a public servant is justiciable by way of a judicial review. The Court agreed with Lord Diplock in the GCHQ case that:

For a decision to be susceptible to judicial review the decision-maker must be empowered by public law (and not merely, as in arbitration, by agreement between private parties) to make decisions that, if validly made, will lead to administrative action or abstention from action by an authority endowed by law with executive powers, which have one or other of the consequences, mentioned in the preceding paragraph.

In addition, the decision must have consequences which affect some person (or body of persons) other than the decision-maker, although it may affect him or her too:

It must affect such other person either:

(a) by altering rights or obligations of that person which are enforceable by or against him in private law; or
(b) by depriving him of some benefit or advantage which either (i) he had in the past been permitted by the decision-maker to enjoy and which he can legitimately expect to be permitted to continue to do so until there has been communicated to him some rational grounds for withdrawing it on which he had been given an opportunity to comment; or (ii) he has received assurance from the decision-maker will not be withdrawn ...

The Court held that the report made by the prison medical officer was obviously a decision but that alone did not make him a "decision-maker" in the sense explained by Lord Diplock. This was because the officer's report that the appellant was fit for caning did not have legal effect – the District Court judge was duty bound to impose the sentence of caning irrespective of what the officer might have said in his report. Hence, it was not a case for judicial review at all. The Court also said that another example of non-decision-making conduct was a police officer arresting a person suspected of committing an offence.

This approach was also adopted in Comptroller of Income Tax v. ACC (2010). The Court of Appeal held it is trite law that a quashing order will not lie unless a public authority has done something that a court can quash or, in other words, deprive of legal effect. It observed that "a decision need not in itself have a direct legal effect or consequence before it can be quashed. A decision which operates as a prerequisite to or a step in a process capable of altering rights, interests or liabilities may also be the subject of a quashing order." The Court eventually concluded that, "a quashing order will only lie against decisions which have some form of actual or ostensible legal effect, whether direct or indirect. A mere opinion clearly does not fall within this category."

At present, the approach in Singapore to decisions without legal effect is less liberal than that in the United Kingdom. It has been said that the English courts "now take a broad view and it is no longer necessary for a claimant to demonstrate that a decision or action has direct legal consequences upon the claimant". For instance, these courts have expanded the scope of matters that fall within the remit of judicial review challenges to encompass even press releases and policy guidance issued by public authorities. This is illustrated by the case of R. (Axon) v. Secretary of State for Health (2006), in which guidance issued by the Department of Health, alleged to be unlawful and in contravention of Article 8 of the European Convention on Human Rights, was amenable to judicial review. Cases of this kind may be explainable on the basis that the actions in question have some indirect legal effect.

=== Decisions having only private effect ===
Private associations and country clubs have no obvious public law function, yet the courts exercise judicial review over their decisions and proceedings, such as hearings relating to disciplinary matters and those held to decide if persons should be deprived of their memberships in the associations, to ensure that they are fair and comply with the requirements of natural justice. It has been suggested that the courts' jurisdiction in such matters depends on contract. The rules of an association form a contract between the members of the association themselves, and the need for hearings to be conducted in accordance with natural justice is an implied term in the contract. Accordingly, the courts are merely enforcing the contract rather than exercising a judicial review function.

The jurisdiction of the courts in reviewing the decisions of such domestic tribunals is of a limited nature. The Court of Appeal of England and Wales held in Dawkins v. Antrobus (1881) that before a member is expelled from a club for committing an offence against the club's constitution, the member has to be given proper notice of the meeting, an opportunity to attend the meeting, and an opportunity to be heard. Moreover, the charges made against him and the proceedings must be conducted bona fide, fairly, and in the honest exercise of the powers given to the meeting by the club. However, these conditions having been fulfilled, "the court has no right to consider whether or not what was done by the meeting was right or whether or not what was decided was reasonable". The court will not resolve factual issues as these are within the scope of the tribunal's inquiry.

In Singapore, the position is similar. It was held by the Court of Appeal in Singapore Amateur Athletics Association v. Haron bin Mundir (1993) that:

The function of the courts is to see that the rules of natural justice have been observed, and that the decision has been honestly arrived at. The court has no power to review the evidence for the purpose of deciding whether the tribunal came to a right conclusion. It is not the function of the court when exercising such supervisory jurisdiction to resolve issues of fact which are within the proper sphere of the tribunal's inquiry.

The extent of the duty to act fairly varies greatly from case to case. Basic norms of fairness in the conduct of disciplinary proceedings need to be observed more strictly where the vocational future of a person is at stake, where there is an express duty on an association to make a decision only after conducting a hearing or an inquiry, and where the exercise of disciplinary powers may deprive a person of his or her property rights or impose a penalty on him or her.

== Justiciability ==
A legal issue must be justiciable before the High Court will grant an applicant leave to apply for judicial review. Justiciability recognizes the limited capabilities of the courts. It delineates certain issues which fall beyond the purview of judicial review because those matters are unsuited for adjudication, due to the nature of the litigation process and judicial expertise. The doctrine is based on an understanding of the separation of powers and the need to find the right constitutional balance between the courts and the executive. For example, matters of policy or subjective preference, and polycentric public policy issues, are better left in the hands of an elected body of persons.

However, justiciability is a concept that eludes precise categorization or definition, and this has caused disquiet amongst some critics. The implication is that there may be some unfairness where questionable executive action remains unchallenged. Nonetheless, the concept of justiciability is useful in determining the likelihood of whether an executive action is within the purview of judicial review.

=== Position in the United Kingdom ===
==== Prerogative powers and the supervisory role of the courts ====
The royal prerogative refers to the exceptional powers and privileges only personally exercisable by the monarch. These important rights, immunities and privileges arguably belong to the Crown, which uses them for the performance of its constitutional duties and the governing of the country. Important prerogatives include:

- legislative powers exercised through orders in council (a form of delegated legislation);
- powers in relation to the conduct of foreign affairs, in particular the making of treaties and declarations of war;
- powers in respect of the organization and disposition of the armed forces;
- the power to confer certain honours;
- the power required by the government in times of emergency, particularly during wartime; and
- certain powers in respect of the administration of justice.

These powers were generally devolved to the prime minister and ministers. The matters are political by nature and call for political judgment rather than judicial control. Thus, Parliament is the most appropriate forum for debate and the best qualified to control the executive. However, in practice, parliamentary accountability of ministers is not entirely effective. The prerogative powers that the government officials exercise on behalf of the Crown, coupled with a weak system of checks and balances between the Parliament and the executive, can lead to an abuse of those powers which may be detrimental to the people. The possibility of such abuse, coupled with the way administrative law and judicial review evolved since the 1960s – a period of judicial activism – led courts in the United Kingdom to take an increasing interest in the manner in which prerogative powers had been exercised.

==== Evolution towards reviewability ====
Traditionally, the regulation of executive action was met with judicial reluctance to intervene. Certain types of governmental discretion, exercised using prerogative powers, were regarded as beyond the scope of judicial scrutiny because they involved issues of substantive policy. However, developments focused on the substance of the issues at hand, rather than merely accepting that the prerogative power is non-justiciable per se. Simply put, the focus shifted from the source of the power to the subject matter.

In Chandler v. Director of Public Prosecutions (1962), Lord Devlin stated: "It is the duty of the courts to be as alert now as they have always been to prevent any abuse of the prerogative." Lord Denning, the Master of the Rolls, applied a similar reasoning in Laker Airways Ltd. v. Department of Trade (1976) and held that prerogative powers were as reviewable as any other power and could not be used by the Government to protect themselves when they were removing the protection granted to parties under a statute. He stated, obiter, as follows:

The law does not interfere with the proper exercise of discretion by the executive in those situations: but it can set limits by defining the bounds of the activity: and it can intervene if the discretion is exercised improperly or mistakenly. That is a fundamental principle of our constitution. ... Seeing that the prerogative is a discretionary power to be exercised for the public good, it follows that its exercise can be examined by the courts just as any other discretionary power which is vested in the executive.

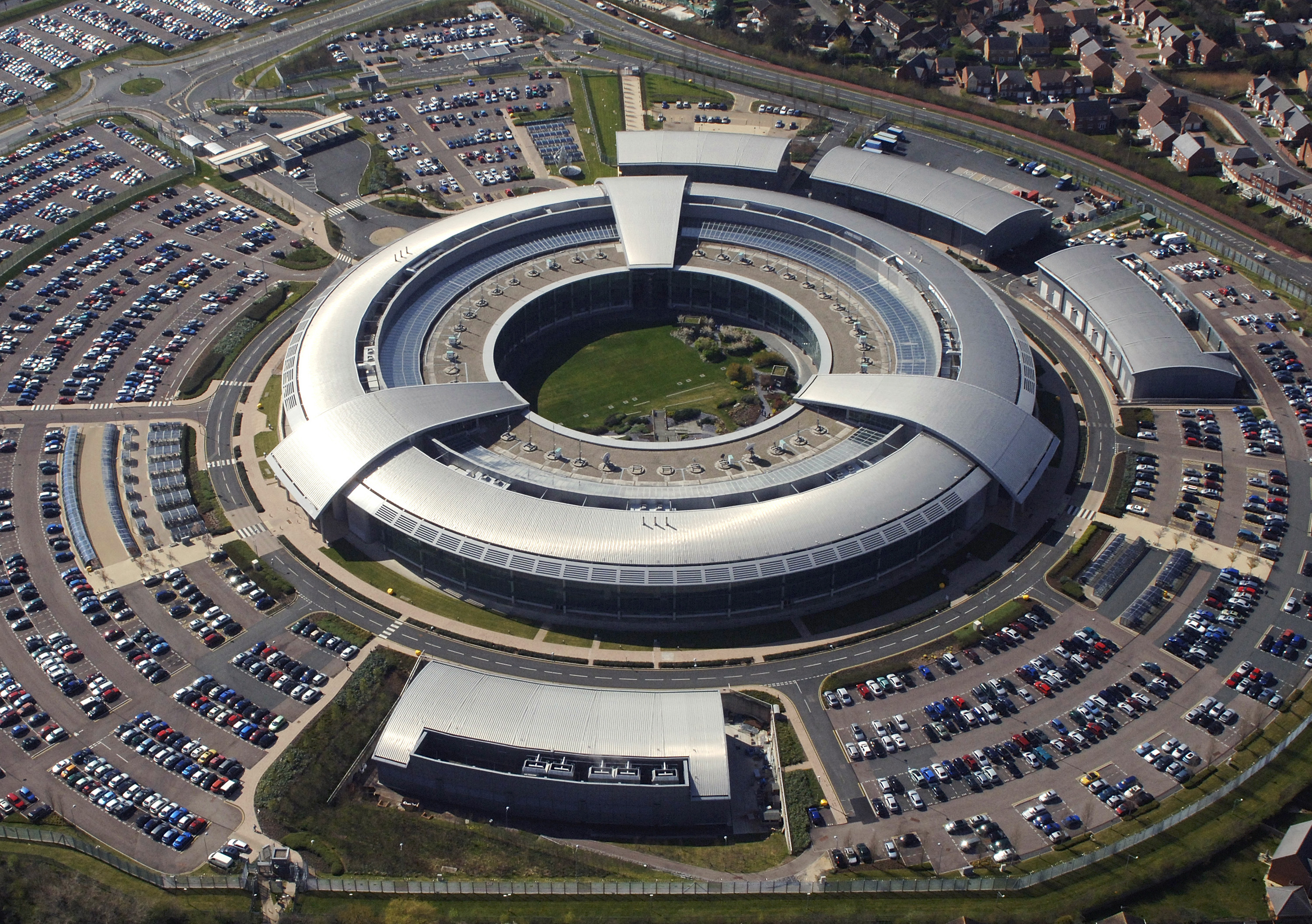
Government Communications Headquarters (GCHQ) in Cheltenham, Gloucestershire, popularly known as "The Doughnut". In a 1984 decision, the House of Lords held that although a government order banning GCHQ employees from joining trade unions was judicially reviewable, the court would not do so as the matter involved national security and so was not justiciable.

In R. v. Criminal Injuries Compensation Board, ex parte Lain (1967), it was held that the powers of the Board were in principle reviewable, despite it having been established under prerogative powers. This case was cited with approval in the GCHQ case, which reflects the modern position on the reviewability of prerogative powers in the United Kingdom. In this case, their Lordships unanimously held that executive action was not immune from judicial review merely because it was carried out in pursuance of a power derived from the common law (or the prerogative) rather than a statutory source. It was the subject-matter that counted, not the source. In this case, the Government, through an order in council, banned employees of the Government Communications Headquarters from joining a trade union. The House of Lords held that this exercise of the prerogative was judicially reviewable, and the trade unions had a legitimate expectation of prior consultation before the ban was imposed. However, although the failure to consult the unions was unfair, this lapse from proper procedure was overridden by national security considerations and thus not justiciable.

In GCHQ, Lord Scarman cited the authority of ex parte Lain and R. v. Secretary of State for the Home Department, ex parte Hosenball (1977) in stressing that the modern law of judicial review had overwhelmed the old restrictions on the justiciability of the prerogative:

[T]he law relating to judicial review has now reached the stage where it can be said with confidence that, if the subject matter in respect of which prerogative power is exercised is justiciable, that is to say if it is a matter upon which the court can adjudicate, the exercise of the power is subject to review in accordance with the principles developed in respect of the review of the exercise of statutory power. ... Today, therefore, the controlling factor in determining whether the exercise of prerogative power is subject to judicial review is not its source but its subject matter.

The legal implications of GCHQ were that many areas once considered unreviewable were now potentially open to judicial scrutiny by the United Kingdom courts, except for a list of prerogatives that Lord Roskill provided as being non-reviewable "because their nature and subject matter are such as not to be amenable to the judicial process". These included prerogative powers of treaty-making, the defence of the realm, the prerogative of mercy, the granting of honours, the dissolution of parliament, and the appointment of ministers. Subsequent case law shows that this list has largely been accepted, and there is indication that the judges have continued to move with a degree of circumspection, and sometimes even in reaction against such developments. However, in Campaign for Nuclear Disarmament v. Prime Minister (2002), Justice Maurice Kay accepted that the ambit of the "forbidden areas" identified by Lord Roskill is not immutable, and had been reduced in some cases.

The attitude of the courts in the United Kingdom is summarized in the obiter comments of Lord Justice Simon Brown in R. v. Ministry of Defence, ex parte Smith (1995):

To my mind only the rarest cases would today be ruled strictly beyond the court's purview – only cases involving national security properly so called and where in addition the courts really do lack the expertise or material to form a judgment on the point at issue.

=== Position in Singapore ===
==== Chng Suan Tze v. Minister for Home Affairs ====
Justiciability was applied as a threshold issue in Singapore in Chng Suan Tze v. Minister for Home Affairs (1988). Here, the appellants were arrested for allegedly being involved in a Marxist conspiracy to undermine the Government, and were issued detention orders under section 8(1)(a) of the Internal Security Act. The respondents submitted that "as the subject matter in ss 8 and 10 of the ISA relates to matters of national security the court is precluded from reviewing the exercising of such discretion since matters of national security should be left to those responsible for it." The Court of Appeal agreed with this submission, stating that while an exercise of discretion is generally subject to judicial review on objective grounds, a court will be precluded from reviewing a decision that was made for national security purposes. This position was consistent with the holdings in The Zamora (1916) and the GCHQ case.

The Court added that there is a need for the decision-maker to adduce evidence in court to prove that considerations of national security are involved. A mere assertion by the decision-maker that a matter involves national security does not preclude the court's judicial function of determining whether the decision was in fact based on grounds of national security. In other words, national security cannot be raised as a plea in bar to prevent the court from considering an application at all. However, what the court cannot do is decide what action national security requires. This is to be left solely to those responsible for it.

On the facts, the Court held that a plain reading of section 8 of the ISA suggests that where a decision is made that it is "necessary" to detain someone "with a view to preventing that person from acting in any manner prejudicial to the security of Singapore", the decision will clearly be based on national security considerations. Whether detention is necessary is a matter solely for the executive's judgment. However, the courts can still review the decision in terms of whether the exercise of discretion fell within the scope of section 8.

==== Lee Hsien Loong v. Review Publishing Co. Ltd. and subsequent developments ====
The law relating to justiciability was discussed comprehensively by Judicial Commissioner Sundaresh Menon in the High Court decision Lee Hsien Loong v. Review Publishing Co. Ltd. (2007). After examining a line of cases, the judge laid down the following principles.

===== Principles concerning justiciability =====
First, there are provinces of executive decision-making that are and should be immune from judicial review. This is reflected the doctrine of separation of powers embedded in Singapore's Westminster constitutional framework. Secondly, the span of executive decisions immune from judicial review include those involving matters of "high policy", such as the dissolution of Parliament, the conduct of foreign affairs, the making of treaties, matters pertaining to war and the deployment of armed forces, and national defence. Deference should be accorded to the executive branch in respect of decisions concerning these matters. The High Court examined three cases which fall comfortably within this class. In The Fagernes (1927) the Court of Appeal of England and Wales considered the question of determining territorial boundaries, and held that "any definitive statement from the proper representative of the Crown as to the territory of the Crown must be treated as conclusive". Aksionairnoye Obschestvo A. M. Luther v. James Sagor & Co. (1921) and Civil Aeronautics Administration v. Singapore Airlines Ltd. (2004) involved the recognition of sovereign status. It was held in Singapore Airlines that "a question such as that which arises in the present case, whether an entity is a State so as to enjoy sovereign immunity in Singapore, is eminently a matter within the exclusive province of the Executive to determine, as what are involved in the question are not only matters of fact but also matters of policy".

Thirdly, apart from issues of foreign affairs and national defence, there are other areas that are non-justiciable such as the interpretation of international treaties operating solely on the international plane. This is illustrated by Campaign for Nuclear Disarmament, in which it was held that for the court to assume jurisdiction in such areas would be an "exorbitant arrogation of adjudicative power", as the court could not presume that its ruling would bind other states. Another non-justiciable area is where the legislature has made it clear that a particular question is reserved to the executive to answer, as in Singapore Airlines which noted that section 18 of the State Immunity Act requires those claiming sovereign immunity from lawsuits to first obtain certification from the Singapore Government. In such situations, it is not for the court to disregard the executive's judgment.

Judicial Commissioner Menon rejected a highly rigid and categorical approach to determining the justiciability of an issue, because the theory of the separation of powers is to be interpreted and applied sensibly. The intensity of the review depends on the context behind it and upon common sense. This was the approach taken in Marchiori v. Environment Agency (2002) which noted that "one context will shade into another". He highlighted four principles that bear noting when determining whether an issue is justiciable:

- Subject matter. First, the justiciability of an issue depends on the subject matter at hand and not the source of decision-making power. This was the principle stated in GCHQ and reiterated in Campaign for Nuclear Disarmament. Where the executive has the best access to available materials, its views should be decisive or at least highly persuasive. It was acknowledged in Singapore Airlines that there may be matters of fact not in the public domain which may be known only to the executive. Where sensitive facts are concerned, Singapore's adversarial system is undesirable as parties must adduce evidence at a trial. Furthermore, not all pertinent facts might be presented before the court.
- Ability of judges to balance competing policy considerations. Where the decision requires the intricate balancing of various competing policy considerations, judges may be ill-equipped to decide because of their limited training, experience and access to materials. Thus, the courts should avoid reviewing the merits of such executive decisions. This was mentioned in GCHQ where Lord Diplock held that the type of evidence admissible in the judicial process and the way in which it is adduced tends to exclude from the attention of the court competing policy considerations which need to be weighed against one another.
- Embarrassing or tying the hands of the executive. The court should abstain from interfering where a judicial pronouncement could embarrass another branch of government or tie its hands in the conduct of affairs traditionally falling within its purview. In Campaign for Nuclear Disarmament, the Divisional Court of England and Wales held that the applicant's true purpose for seeking the court's interpretation of a United Nations Security Council resolution was to limit the government's freedom in relation to the use of military force and to exercise diplomatic pressure in advance. Thus, the matter should be regarded as non-justiciable.
- Areas entrusted to the democratically elected branches. The court should always exercise restraint and keep in mind the fact that the Singapore system of government operates within the framework of three co-equal branches, and there are areas of prerogative power that the democratically elected branches are entrusted to take care of. Marchiori explained that "the graver a matter of State and the more widespread its possible effects, the more respect will be given, within the framework of the constitution, to the democracy to decide its outcome". In such instances, the executive and legislature are accountable to the electorate, not the judiciary. Those who are unsatisfied should sound their dissatisfaction in the ballot box.

In Lee Hsien Loong the appellants, which were in Hong Kong, challenged the jurisdiction of the High Court to hear a defamation suit brought by the respondents on the ground, among others, that the service of the writ should have been effected in accordance with the civil procedure convention set down in the Treaty of Judicial Assistance in Civil and Commercial Matters between the Republic of Singapore and the People's Republic of China. Thus, although this was not a judicial review case, the Court had to consider the justiciability of determining whether the treaty applied to Hong Kong, and whether the Court could depart from the views of the executive branch on the matter which were stated in a letter issued by the Ministry of Foreign Affairs. The Court held that the present case did not involve the exercise of the sovereign or legislative prerogative in matters of high policy. Rather, it was concerned with the effect, and not the making, of the treaty or whether it was advisable. Thus, the letter from the Ministry was not an exercise of executive prerogative power, but merely a statement of opinion.

Furthermore, the appeal did not engage foreign policy considerations. The treaty was a civil convention between two countries and an agreement to render mutual judicial assistance, and had nothing to do with foreign affairs other than that it was made between state parties. It also did not involve the policing of government conduct in international affairs, because it only implicated the procedures private litigants had to take to serve writs on defendants residing in Hong Kong. When interpreting the treaty, the Court only had to determine the domestic legal obligations of the respondents seeking to serve a writ out of jurisdiction. Thus, the issue of whether the treaty applied to Hong Kong was justiciable, and the Ministry's letter was not decisive on the matter.

===== Justiciability of prosecutorial discretion =====
Article 35(8) of the Constitution of Singapore empowers the Attorney-General to institute, conduct or discontinue any criminal proceedings. This provision confers wide discretionary powers upon the Attorney-General. However, since unfettered discretion contradicts the rule of law, the Attorney-General's powers are not absolute and are subject to legal limits. In Law Society of Singapore v. Tan Guat Neo Phyllis (2008), a three-judge bench of the High Court consisting of Chief Justice Chan Sek Keong, Judge of Appeal Andrew Phang and Justice Andrew Ang held that although the prosecutorial power is a constitutional power, it is not absolute and its exercise can be challenged in "very exceptional case[s]".

The Court held that it can judicially review the exercise of prosecutorial power and declare a prosecution to be unconstitutional for breach of constitutional power, for example, if a prosecution is brought in bad faith for an ulterior motive and not to punish an accused person for an offence he or she committed. A prosecution can also be found to have infringed the accused person's constitutional rights. This may happen if law enforcement officers themselves commit crimes by using agents provocateur in a particularly egregious manner to entrap accused persons into committing crimes, and the Attorney-General elects to prosecute only the accused persons but not the officers, as this may infringe the accused persons' right to equality guaranteed by Article 12(1) of the Constitution.

===== Justiciability of the clemency power =====
Traditionally at common law, the prerogative of mercy – that is, the power of the executive government to pardon or to grant clemency to a convicted criminal – was regarded as outside the courts' supervisory jurisdiction and hence non-justiciable. This changed with the Divisional Court's decision in R. v. Secretary of State for the Home Department, ex parte Bentley (1993), which held that the prerogative of mercy is reviewable in some circumstances. This case was considered by the Singapore Court of Appeal in Yong Vui Kong v. Attorney-General (2011), Chief Justice Chan expressing the opinion that the case "clearly decided that the prerogative of mercy would be reviewable if it were exercised based on an error of law (in that case, the Home Secretary's misconstruction of the type of pardon which the Home Office could grant), or based on arbitrary and/or extraneous considerations", though courts still cannot review the merits of any clemency decision.

In Yong Vui Kong, the Court described the clemency power in Singapore as vested exclusively in the executive, and thus not justiciable on the merits. Despite this, it is not an "extra-legal" power that is beyond any legal constraints. Agreeing with Tan Guat Neo Phyllis, the Court held that the clemency power is subject to judicial review if it can be shown to have been exercised unconstitutionally, in bad faith or for extraneous purposes. In addition, the fact that Article 22P(2) of the Constitution stipulates specific procedural safeguards in death penalty cases indicates that the clemency power must be reviewable to ensure that these safeguards have been complied with. Article 22P(2) requires documents from the trial judge and the appellate court, and the Attorney-General's opinion on the case, to be sent to the Cabinet for consideration so that it can advise the President on the exercise of the clemency power. These procedural requirements imply that Cabinet has a constitutional duty to consider the documents in good faith before advising the President. If evidence is adduced to show that the Cabinet did not consider the offender's case impartially and in good faith (for example, it never met to discuss the case, or tossed a coin instead of properly considering the materials transmitted to it), Cabinet would have breached Article 22P(2). In such a situation, the courts must be able to review the clemency decision. This conclusion is also mandated by the guarantee in Article 9(1) of the Constitution that a person may not be deprived of either life or personal liberty save in accordance with law.

===== Exceptions =====
Even if the subject-matter of a case is generally non-justiciable, there are exceptions where the courts will still review the case. For instance, a dispute may prima facie involve a non-justiciable area but, on a closer look, the courts may decide that there is a justiciable matter within it. In such a situation, the courts will intervene and review the case. An example of this was given by Judicial Commissioner Menon in Lee Hsien Loong: "[W]here what appears to raise a question of international law in fact bears on the application of domestic law, that is something the court may well find justiciable." In Campaign for Nuclear Disarmament, the court similarly distinguished a pronouncement on the interpretation of a treaty generally, which is impermissible, from the consideration of "the application of an international treaty by reference to the facts of an individual case" which is allowed. Also, in R. v. Secretary of State for Foreign and Commonwealth Affairs, ex parte Everett (1988), the Court of Appeal of England and Wales took the view that a decision by the Secretary of State exercised under the royal prerogative to deny a passport to a British citizen residing abroad raised a justiciable issue because it was not a high policy matter involving foreign affairs but "a matter of administrative decision, affecting the rights of individuals and their freedom of travel".

Judicial Commissioner Menon also mentioned another exception to the justiciability rule: when the courts are able to isolate a pure question of law from what is seemingly a non-justiciable issue. However, the judge did not explain this exception further, and it has not yet been applied or discussed in any other Singapore case.

== See also ==
- Remedies in Singapore administrative law
