= Separation of powers in Singapore =

The Separation of powers in Singapore is governed by Constitution of the Republic of Singapore, which splits the power to govern the country between three branches of government – the parliament, which makes laws; the executive, which executes them; and the judiciary, which enforces them. Each branch, while wielding legitimate power and being protected from external influences, is subject to a system of checks and balances by the other branches to prevent abuse of power. This Westminster constitutional model was inherited from the British during Singapore's colonial years.

The Singapore system of government, as with those of a number of other Commonwealth jurisdictions, exhibits a partial separation of powers. The ministers of the Cabinet, who govern the executive branch of government, are appointed from the Members of Parliament (MPs). The cabinet both comes from and drives the parliament's legislative agenda. In addition, the executive possesses law-making power as it is authorised to issue subsidiary legislation, and the President of Singapore is a member of both the executive and the legislature.

The legislature can exercise checks upon the executive by imposing weak sanctions through the doctrine of individual ministerial responsibility. Cabinet ministers may be called upon to justify their policies in Parliament by elected MPs (backbenchers belonging to the ruling party and opposition MPs), as well as non-elected Members (non-constituency members of parliament (NCMPs) and nominated members of parliament (NMPs)).

The judiciary has the role of safeguarding the constitution, and is able to act as an institutional check through its inherent power to strike down unconstitutional laws. The Supreme Court may also invalidate acts or decisions by the executive which are inconsistent with the Constitution or with administrative law rules. However, judicial power is not unfettered and is also restrained by constitutional and legislative prohibitions. The judiciary also defers to the executive where non-justiciable matters are involved. Judicial independence in Singapore allows the judiciary powers to check the exercise of power by the other branches of government, strengthening the separation of powers. Constitutional safeguards exist to secure the independence of Supreme Court judges, but a point of contention is that State Courts judges do not enjoy security of tenure as they are members of the Singapore Legal Service and may be transferred out of the State Courts to other departments of the Service by the Legal Service Commission.

The separation of powers in Singapore is also enhanced by intra-branch checking mechanisms. Within the executive, the elected president adds to the overall scheme of checks and balances through his discretionary power to block certain government actions. However, the presence of an override mechanism wielded by Parliament blunts the office's powers. The Presidential Council for Minority Rights also serves as a check on the legislature by reviewing bills to ensure that they do not discriminate against racial and religious minorities. However, the Council's powers are constrained by the presence of an override mechanism as well.

Some have criticised the government of Singapore as disregarding constitutionalism and the separation of powers in favour of pragmatism. Former Attorney-General Walter Woon said of Singapore's legal system: "We effectively don't have a Constitution. We have a law that can be easily changed by Parliament, and by the party in power because the party is Parliament."

== Introduction ==
=== Constitutionalism ===
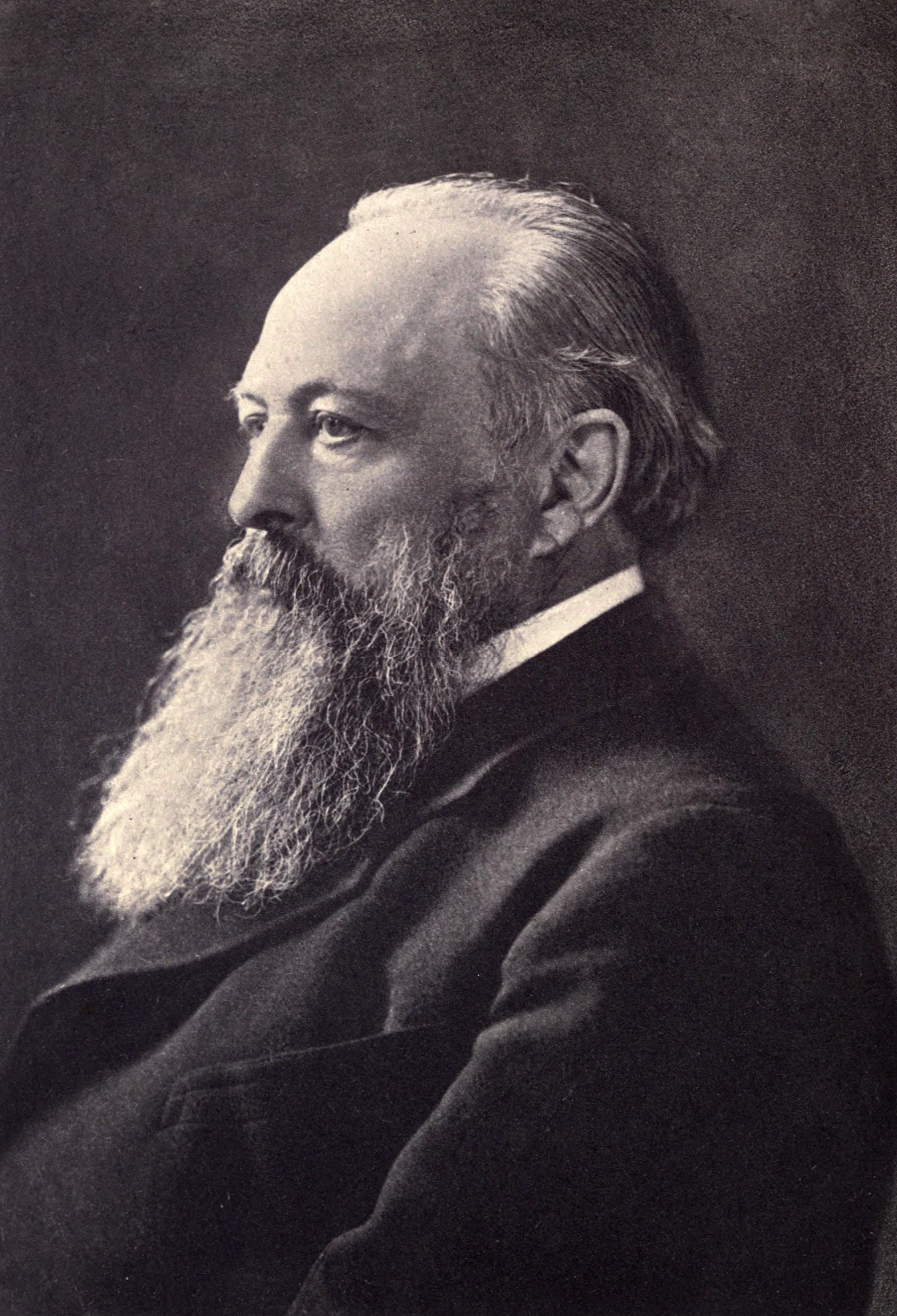
Lord Acton (1834–1902) wrote: "Power tends to corrupt, and absolute power corrupts absolutely."

The idea of separation of powers is founded on the basis of constitutionalism. The notion of constitutionalism is primarily one of culture. Lawrence W. Beer proposed in Constitutional Systems in the Late Twentieth Century Asia (1992) that constitutionalism is where "national history, custom, religion, social values and assumptions about government meet positive law, economic force and power politics". As a result, the notion of constitutionalism differs from region to region and there can be no one specific notion of constitutionalism across the world. As Thio Li-ann puts it, "constitutionalism is itself a form of culture which is constructed, rather than 'organic'; a constitutional order is the 'most complex form of socio-political organisation'".

Even though the constitutional culture differs from country to country, in general the "idea of modern constitutionalism rests upon the distrust of power". This is founded on the problem of power as espoused by Lord Acton – that "[p]ower tends to corrupt, and absolute power corrupts absolutely".

It is this distrust of power that has resulted in the need to ensure separation of powers. The ultimate aim of constitutionalism is to establish the idea of limited government. In countries that subscribe to constitutional supremacy, the constitution is the supreme law of the land and demarcates the extent of power that each branch of government (the executive, legislature and judiciary) is able to wield, as well as how each branch may act as a checking mechanism on the other branches. This aspect of constitutionalism is "concerned with curbing oppressive government and preserving individual freedom while retaining a realm for the exercise of legitimate governmental power".

=== Separation of powers ===
The state needs laws in order for it to function, and this results in the creation of three distinct powers: one to create laws (the legislature), one to execute the laws (executive), and one to ensure that the rules are being followed (judiciary). Each branch of government has its own set of functions and hence the power that is available for each branch to wield is different as well. Even though this power to govern the society has already been divided into the three branches, the idea of constitutionalism implies "a commitment towards regularised legal restraints on power in the form of inter- and intra-institutional checks and balances and legal procedure".

Simply put, there must be a separation of powers, where each branch is able to wield its own power to perform its functions independent of undue influence but yet be restrained from an abuse of its power through checking mechanisms. A system of checks and balances serves to ensure that each power will not be subject to abuse by the controlling body. While the checking mechanisms exercised by each body should be sufficient to prevent abuse of power, they should also not overstep their boundaries and encroach upon the powers that the other branches wield lawfully. In The Federalist No. 51 (6 February 1788), James Madison wrote that "[a]mbition must be made to counteract ambition", while in The Federalist No. 48 (1 February 1788) he explained the need for a system of checks and balances in preserving the separation of powers doctrine:

... unless these departments be so far connected and blended as to give to each a constitutional control over the others, the degree of separation which the maxim requires, as essential to a free government, can never in practice be duly maintained.

==== Reasons for separation of powers ====
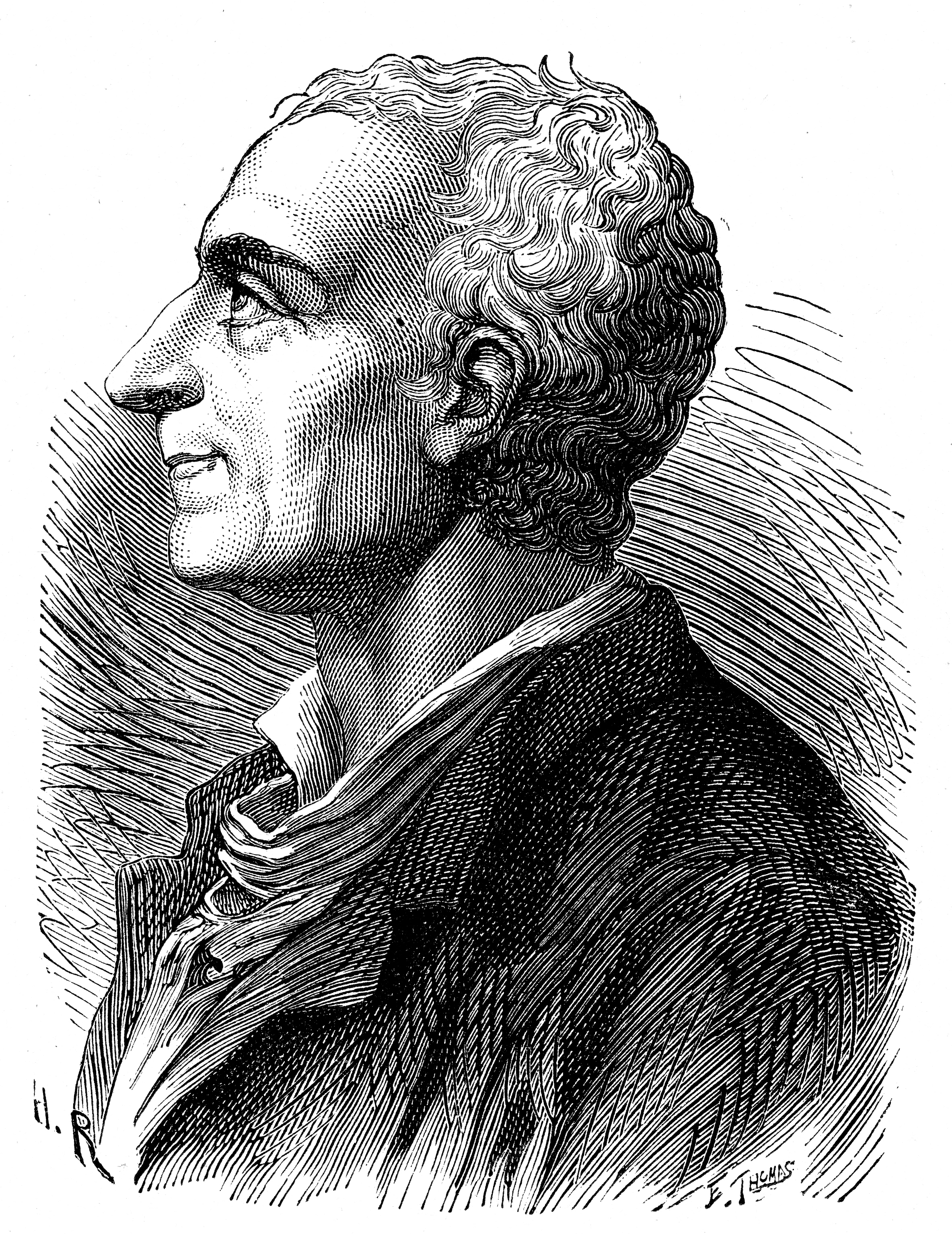
An engraving of Montesquieu (1689–1755) by Émile Bayard, published in Album du centenaire (1889). Montesquieu wrote in The Spirit of the Laws (1748) that arbitrariness and tyranny would result if executive, legislative and judicial powers were united in the same person.

One of the most notable proponents of the conception of separation of powers was Montesquieu in The Spirit of the Laws (1748). In that work, he observed:

When the legislative and executive powers are united in the same person, or in the same body of magistrates, there can be no liberty; because apprehensions may arise, lest the same monarch or senate should enact tyrannical laws, to execute them in a tyrannical manner. Again, there is no liberty, if the judiciary power be not separated form the legislature and executive. Were it joined with the legislative, the life and liberty of the subject would be exposed to arbitrary control; for the judge would be then the legislator. Were it joined to the executive power, the judge might behave with violence and oppression.

The separation of powers brings its merits in just governance. However, where each branch wields more power than it legitimately should, there is room for abuse, leaving the rest of the society open to the potential of being ruled by tyranny of the majority. Hence it is important that a system of checks and balances is in place to ensure that power will not be abused to the detriment of the people.

Separation of powers also promotes the efficiency and competence in allocating powers by "[fitting] form to function by matching tasks to the most suitable body". Specialization of the functions and roles of the various branches helps to promote efficiency as each branch of government has specific tasks and goals that it can work towards. After all, one of the main aims of this measure is to ensure that society's goals are met, and this can be done through an efficient system of government. Lastly, separation of powers helps to enhance democratic responsibility. With the various branches of government being responsible for specific functions, people are more inclined to vote into Parliament (which will form part of the legislature) persons who will best represent their views.

==== Pure and partial separation of powers ====
There are two main notions of separation of powers – pure separation of powers and partial separation of powers. Pure separation of powers was a concept formulated by M. J. C. Vile in Constitutionalism and the Separation of Powers (1967) as a constitutional arrangement where there are no overlaps at all between the branches of government. In fact, "the persons who compose these three agencies of government must be kept separate and distinct, no individual being allowed to be at the same time a member of more than one branch. In this way each of the branches will be a check to the others and no single group of people will be able to control the machinery of the State".

In practice, this is hard to achieve and largely remains a theoretical notion. One of the few states that can be considered close to achieving this state of separation of powers would be the United States of America. On the other hand, legal systems that follow the Westminster model adopt a partial separation of powers. This occurs when there are overlaps across the three branches. In Singapore, the legislature and executive overlap because ministers in the Cabinet are appointed from the Members of Parliament (MPs). Thus, the same group of people are able to exercise both the power to make law and to execute the law.

== Origins of the separation of powers in Singapore ==
The origins of the separation of powers in Singapore lie in the Westminster constitutional model inherited from the United Kingdom during its colonial past, first as part of the Straits Settlements, and then as an independent nation. When Singapore was transferred to the Colonial Office in 1867, it was given a normal colonial constitution. This constitution vested legislative authority over the colony in the Legislative Council of the Straits Settlements. The constitution also retained the structure of the judicial system already established by the Second Charter of Justice, which had vested judicial power in the Court of Judicature of the Straits Settlements. In 1877, an Executive Council was introduced into the government of the Straits Settlements, with the role of advising the Governor on all affairs of importance.

From 1877 onwards, this broad structure specifying the powers of the three organs of state remained largely intact. The constitution remained unchanged until the end of the Japanese Occupation, when the Straits Settlements were disbanded. Although constitutional amendments were then made, the overarching hierarchy of executive, legislative and judicial bodies which had been operating before the war was retained. This basic arrangement also survived Singapore's merger and separation from Malaysia, and consequent independence.

The Singapore Constitution thus vests legislative, executive and judicial power in the legislature, executive and judiciary respectively. This is a defining feature of Westminster-style constitutions, of which Singapore's constitution is one. The doctrine is implicit from the fact that the organs of state have separate roles.

The separation of powers doctrine in Singapore is not absolute but qualified; it is not pure but partial. The partial separation of powers doctrine in Singapore is exemplified in the following ways:

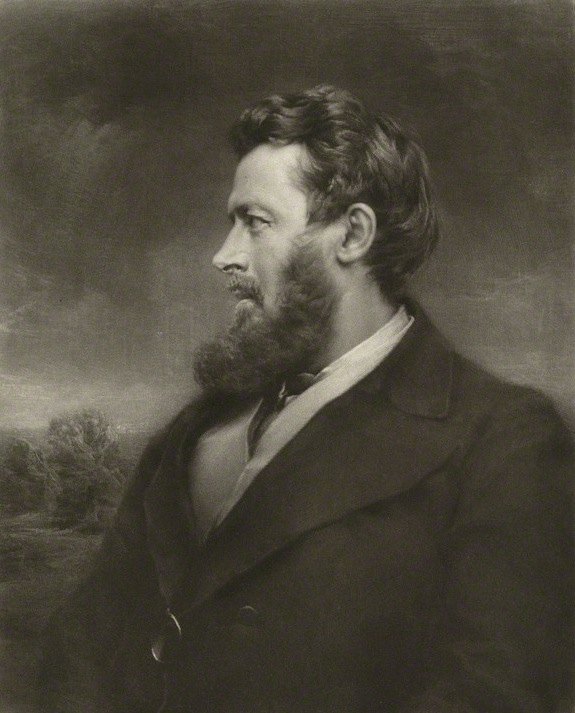
An 1891 mezzotint of Walter Bagehot (1826–1877). Bagehot described the Cabinet of the United Kingdom as a "committee of the legislative body selected to be the executive body".

- Members of the executive drawn from the Parliament. First, Singapore has a parliamentary executive. While the legislature exercises legislative power and the executive exercises executive power, these two institutions are not separate or independent. This feature was described by Walter Bagehot as "the efficient secret of the English Constitution", which was defined as "the close union, the nearly complete fusion of the executive and legislative powers". This fusion is facilitated by the existence of the Cabinet, as a "committee of the legislative body selected to be the executive body". The Ministers in Cabinet are appointed from the MPs; they thus exercise the power both to make and execute the law.
- Executive issues subsidiary legislation. Second, the executive has power to issue subsidiary legislation and assent to treaties. This is contrary to the non-delegation doctrine, by which one branch of government must not authorise another entity to exercise the power or function which it is constitutionally authorised to exercise itself. In Singapore, subsidiary legislation, though made by the executive, has "legislative, as opposed to administrative effect". The contravention of the non-delegation doctrine is deemed necessary because time constraints make it impossible for Parliament to enact all laws. In subsidiary legislation, the broad, general terms in primary legislation are explained and elaborated upon.
- President a member of both the executive and legislature. Third, the President is vested with both executive authority and legislative power. As a member of the legislature, in general the President must assent to all laws passed by the legislature. However, the President has limited discretionary executive powers to withhold assent to certain bills, including attempts by the Government to draw down financial reserves accumulated by past governments, to change the investment ability of the Central Provident Fund Board, and to alter the President's own discretionary powers.

The English influence on Singapore's governmental system is visibly strong, though Singapore's system fundamentally differs from that of the United Kingdom as it is unicameral. Singapore's take on the separation of powers is greatly informed by its unique values and legal culture. The traditional separation of powers doctrine in the United Kingdom is based on a fundamental distrust of human nature, and by extension, an even greater distrust of power, which "tends to corrupt". As a result, it is necessary for each branch of government to be checked and managed, to prevent its otherwise absolute and uncurtailed power being abused. Singapore, on the other hand, has based its system of government on the election of trustworthy and honourable leaders, instead of on the implementation of a system specifically to prevent dishonourable ones misusing their power. In other words, aside from legal methods of controlling government – that is, through institutionalised checks and balances – non-legal methods are used as well, "internally from Parliament and the Executive itself in upholding high standards of public administration and policy".

This attitude towards the control of public power reflects the Confucian ideals underlying the Government's stance that separation of powers is less important than choosing leaders that can be trusted and do not need to be fettered:

The concept of government by honourable men (junzi), who have a duty to do right for the people, and who have the trust and respect of the population, fits us better than the Western idea that a government should be given as limited powers as possible, and should always be treated with suspicion unless proven otherwise.

== Inter-branch checks ==
Since independence, Singapore's legal system has evolved increasingly towards its local context. Developments in government and constitutionalism have brought about distinctive features in its system of checks and balances. A few issues arise due to the long-standing one-party dominance in Singapore's political system. Since the 1963 general election, the People's Action Party has repeatedly prevailed as the majority party in Parliament. In the recent 2011 general election, it managed to capture 81 of 87 seats contested.

=== Legislative checks on the parliamentary executive ===
As mentioned above, Singapore has a parliamentary executive in which Cabinet ministers are drawn from and accountable to Parliament. The existence of a parliamentary executive does not mean government by Parliament; it is a separate and distinct branch of power, suited to make policies and carry out executive decisions.

However, because of the party system, the Cabinet is often composed of the leaders of the majority party in Parliament. As such, it asserts control over the legislative agenda. One associated problem is that of an "elective dictatorship" – Quintin Hogg, Baron Hailsham of St Marylebone, once described it as the dominance of the executive over a subservient Parliament.

==== Ministerial responsibility ====
The doctrine of individual ministerial responsibility is a constitutional convention adopted from the Westminster constitutional model. According to this doctrine, Parliament imposes a check on the Cabinet by scrutinising government bills and actions, and calling upon ministers to justify policies before the House in open debate. This ensures that the Cabinet is accountable not only to Parliament but also to the public, who have access to transcripts of Parliamentary debates.

Consistent with the party system, the Government also observes collective ministerial responsibility or Cabinet collective responsibility. This is enshrined in Article 24(2) of the Constitution, which states that "[s]ubject to the provisions of this Constitution, the Cabinet shall have the general direction and control of the Government and shall be collectively responsible to Parliament". According to Prime Minister Goh Chok Tong in 2002, "[t]he principle of collective responsibility means that there is an agreement between the Prime Minister and his Cabinet colleagues that they will stand together as a team when accounting for their actions before Parliament". This principle also seeks to enhance inter-ministry co-ordination by ensuring that all ministers share the same broad policy positions, and that there is no "unnecessary duplication or, worse, mutual contradiction".

This check on the executive branch, however, is a weak one. Since Cabinet ministers are often the leaders of the majority party in Parliament, they may enforce party discipline and loyalty through the party whip such that MPs from that party conform to the party line. This means that a majority of Parliament will be less inclined, if at all, to oppose or challenge the executive's decisions.

==== Efficacy of opposition MPs, NCMPs and NMPs ====
===== Opposition members of parliament =====
Given the one-party dominance in Singapore, the opposition MPs in Parliament play a crucial role in checking the executive. They enforce the doctrine of ministerial responsibility by providing constructive criticism of executive policies. They are also entitled to vote for or against bills and motions, but this may exercise little influence over majoritarian power. As such, the effectiveness of the opposition hinges on its ability to keep the executive, as well as the majority party, vigilant and accountable to society.

===== Non-Constituency members of parliament =====
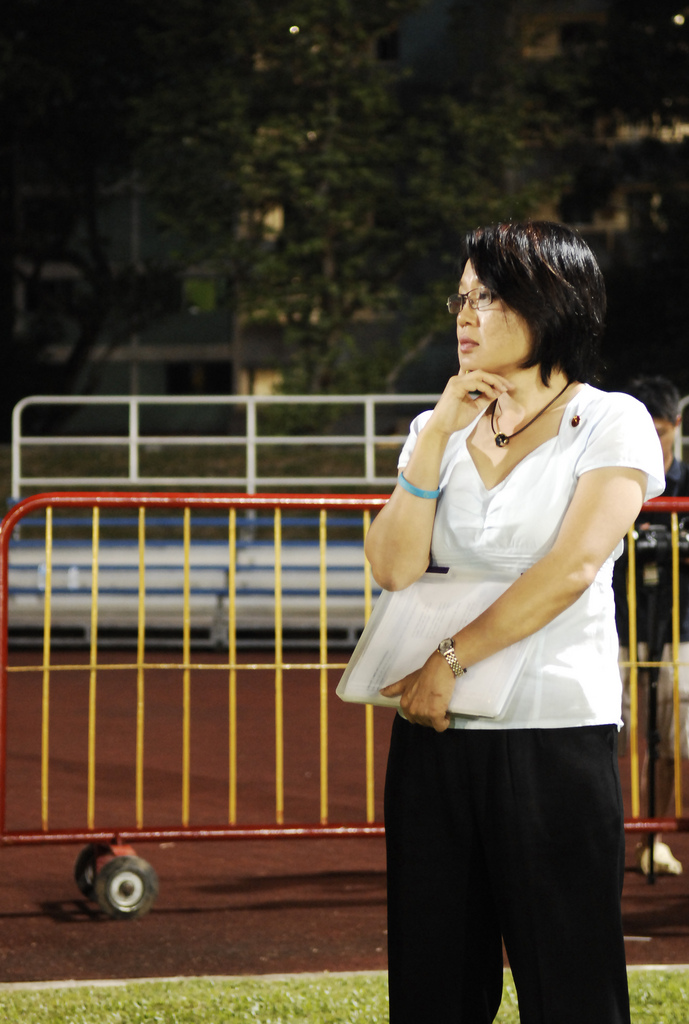
Sylvia Lim at a Workers' Party rally at Bedok Stadium during the 2011 general election. Before being elected as an MP for Aljunied GRC in that year, Lim was an NCMP between 2006 and 2011.

Non-Constituency members of parliament (NCMPs) were introduced into Parliament for the purpose of ensuring "the representation in Parliament of a minimum number of Members from a political party or parties not forming the Government". The number of NCMPs in Parliament is 12 subtracted by the number of Opposition Members of Parliament elected at a general election.

Marking a departure from the Westminster model, the NCMP scheme was conceived to introduce alternative political voices in Parliament. According to Deputy Prime Minister Wong Kan Seng, the presence of a parliamentary minority would help younger MPs gain experience in debate, ensure transparency of Parliamentary proceedings and "dispel any suspicions of cover-ups", as well as give the opposition a forum to put forth their agenda. NCMPs enjoy the same privileges and immunities as elected Members, but they cannot vote on a bill to amend the Constitution; a supply, supplementary or final supply bill; a money bill, a vote of no confidence in the Government or a motion for the removal of the President from office.

Some commentators have remarked that the NCMP scheme is premised on the assumption that the one party-dominance will continue to govern Singapore's political state of affairs. Nonetheless, the scheme gives the opposition parties a platform to share their political ideas, as well as augment opposition strength in Parliament as a check on the executive.

===== Nominated members of parliament =====
Nominated members of parliament (NMPs) are another departure from the Westminster model. Unlike NCMPs, NMPs are intended to be apolitical voices in Parliament – the purpose of the NCMP scheme is to have MPs hailing from various fields and professions who can "reflect as wide a range of independent and non-partisan views as possible".

Though NMPs may in effect be insignificant as a check on the executive, they can present alternative viewpoints which the Government may consider and even choose to respond to, particularly where they concern socially significant issues. As NMP Paulin Tay Straughan has said: "The day when we move into a two-party system where opposing voices are more visible, we will not need NMPs or NCMPs anymore. But until we get there, the NMPs have a role to play."

=== Judicial checks on the legislature and executive ===
In Law Society of Singapore v. Tan Guat Neo Phyllis (2008), the High Court described the guardianship role of the judiciary in safeguarding the Constitution and the doctrine of separation of powers, holding that to prevent each arm of government from acting beyond its constitutional powers, "[u]nder the Constitution, the means adopted and recognised by all three arms of government is the judicial power of the court to review the legality of legislative and executive acts and declare them unconstitutional and of no legal effect if they contravene the provisions of the Constitution".

==== Judicial independence ====
Judicial independence from the other branches of government allows the judiciary to act as a check and balance on the exercise of legislative and executive power, and thus enhances the separation of powers. The extent of judicial independence in Singapore can be examined by reference to the way judges are appointed, and, in particular, the independence of the judiciary of the State Courts. These two aspects relate specifically to the protection of the judiciary as an institution from extraneous influences, rather than the protection of individual members of the judiciary from external pressures.

===== Supreme Court judiciary =====
Appointments of judges and Judicial Commissioners (JCs) of the Supreme Court are made by the President, when, in his discretion, he concurs with the Prime Minister's advice on the matter. The Prime Minister thus possesses the primary power of appointment of judges of the Supreme Court. Although the Prime Minister must consult the Chief Justice when advising the President to appoint judges and JCs, and the President is empowered to veto judicial appointments, these are relatively small roles played in the final say as to who should be appointed to the judiciary. Thus, it is said that the judiciary may not be an effective check against the abuse of executive power since the executive is likely to appoint judges who believe in the same fundamental policies. This militates against the separation of powers. On the other hand, in a small jurisdiction like Singapore, the executive and judicial roles are inevitably intertwined as there will be very few potential appointees to the Supreme Court who have never been involved with the executive government.

The Constitution contains several safeguards to protect the judiciary from political pressures. For instance, Supreme Court judges hold office until the age of 65, and may not be removed from office except under special circumstances. The President may, on the recommendation of a tribunal of five present or former Supreme Court judges from Singapore or judges of equivalent status from any part of the Commonwealth, remove a judge from office, if the Prime Minister or the Chief Justice acting on the Prime Minister's advice informs him of the judge's misbehaviour or inability to properly discharge official functions. Supreme Court judges are also constitutionally guaranteed protection from adverse remunerative changes.

It has been argued that the power of the executive to appoint JCs for limited periods or to hear a specific case, and to extend the tenure of Supreme Court judges beyond the age of 65 by hiring them on a term basis, may motivate such judges to render decisions that are in line with government policy. As regards the latter, a mechanism for the extension of a judge's tenure might be regarded as necessary to ensure that better judges are not replaced by less capable ones.

===== State Courts judiciary =====
In Singapore, the lower or subordinate judiciary consists of the District Judges and Magistrates of the State Courts. These judges are members of the Legal Service, which is governed by the Legal Service Commission ("LSC"). The President appoints State Courts judges from among the members of the Legal Service on the recommendation of the Chief Justice, who is also the chairman of the LSC.

The LSC is composed of members who enjoy differing degrees of independence from the executive branch. These include the Chief Justice, the Attorney-General and a superior judge appointed by the Chief Justice who are highly independent from executive influence. On the other hand, the remaining persons who are the chairman and two other members of the Public Service Commission enjoy less security of office as they enjoy a tenure of only five years.

The subordinate judiciary in Singapore has come under more scrutiny than the superior judiciary. State Courts judges lack tenure, and the LSC determines the terms of their appointments. Thus, the substance of the criticisms is that the career advancement of the lower judiciary depends on the LSC, of which the Attorney-General is a member. Members of the subordinate judiciary can be transferred out of the courts to the Attorney-General's Chambers or to some other government department to serve as legal officers. Thus, there are worries of heavy legislative and executive influence over the appointment and removal of subordinate judges, and that they will be influenced by government ideology and policy in their role as judges.

The case of Senior District Judge Michael Khoo being appointed as a deputy public prosecutor in August 1981 is often cited in this context. The appointment occurred shortly after Khoo had acquitted J. B. Jeyaretnam, a prominent opposition MP, of certain charges of having fraudulently transferred cheques to prevent the distribution of money to the creditors of the Workers' Party of Singapore, and of making a false declaration. The reason for the transfer was never conclusively established; while it could have been motivated by executive disapproval of the acquittals, it may well have been a routine transfer with no implications for executive interference in the subordinate judiciary. The latter was the official explanation for the transfer.

However, it has also been said that observations about the apparent connections between the executive and judiciary are merely theoretical, and that for a more accurate analysis of the separation of powers in Singapore the "[j]udiciary must be judged on its performance in the context of actual litigation". Furthermore, assertions that the subordinate judiciary is not separate from the executive since the LSC is allied to the government disregard the fact that the Chief Justice is the head of the LSC and has the final say on judicial postings. Moreover, in a small state, it may not be feasible to have a separate judicial and legal service.

==== Judicial review ====
In Mohammad Faizal bin Sabtu v. Public Prosecutor (2012), the High Court explained that the doctrine of separation of powers "entails, in so far as the judicial branch is concerned, that the legislative and the executive branches of the State may not interfere with the exercise of the judicial power by the judicial branch. This total separation between the exercise of the judicial power on the one hand and the exercise of the legislative and the executive powers on the other hand is based on the rule of law."

In Singapore, the Supreme Court upholds the separation of powers and constitutional supremacy by exercising jurisdiction to judicially review the constitutionality of legislation, thereby acting as a check upon the legislature. The High Court in Chan Hiang Leng Colin v. Public Prosecutor (1994) held that the court has "the power and duty to ensure that the provisions of the Constitution are observed. The court also has a duty to declare invalid any exercise of power, legislative and executive, which exceeds the limits of the power conferred by the Constitution, or which contravenes any prohibition which the Constitution provides." The Supreme Court also exercises supervisory jurisdiction over inferior tribunals and public authorities, and can hold that acts and decisions by them which infringe administrative law rules are invalid.

==== Limits of judicial review ====
===== Constitutional and legislative prohibitions =====
While the judiciary is empowered to declare ordinary legislation unconstitutional, the legislature is able to overrule such decisions by amending the Constitution. For example, in Chng Suan Tze v. Minister for Home Affairs (1988), the Court of Appeal adopted an objective test for reviewing ministerial discretion in the issuance of preventive detention orders under the Internal Security Act ("ISA"). However, within a month of the decision, Parliament amended the Constitution and the Internal Security Act to reinstate the subjective test espoused in Lee Mau Seng v. Minister for Home Affairs (1971).

This form of legislative over-ruling, if done frequently, has two major detrimental effects. First, if the legislature or executive is seen as being able to manipulate the constitutional limits on their powers, this greatly impairs judicial independence. Secondly, it may thwart the perception that the judiciary is a co-equal institution in the scheme of the separation of powers, thus causing a loss of respect and public confidence in the system. Speaking in Parliament during the Second Reading of the bill amending the Constitution to reverse the effect of Chng Suan Tze, the Minister for Law S. Jayakumar quoted Lord Diplock to justify this truncation of judicial review on the basis that national security is "the responsibility of the executive government", and it is a non-justiciable question which "the judicial process is totally inept to deal with". He stated that the executive would be accountable to both Parliament and the people for its exercise of discretionary powers.

Further, the political branches of government may seek to limit judicial review through the use of ouster clauses. Examples of such clauses include Article 18(9) of the Constitution, section 8B(2) of the ISA, and section 18 of the Maintenance of Religious Harmony Act. However, it remains an open question whether ouster clauses are fully effective or whether, as the House of Lords held in Anisminic Ltd. v. Foreign Compensation Commission (1968), they do not apply to the acts and decisions of public authorities that are a nullity. Speaking extrajudicially, Chief Justice Chan Sek Keong suggested that any statutory clause attempting to oust the supervisory jurisdiction of the courts may contravene Article 93, which vests the judicial power of Singapore in the courts.

===== Doctrine of non-justiciability =====
The courts have developed an internal doctrine of self-imposed judicial restraint by which they will either decline to review what they consider a non-justiciable issue, calibrate review to a low intensity, or exercise review on limited grounds.

In matters pertaining to "high policy" such as treaty-making, national defence and foreign relations, the courts will generally decline judicial review of the exercise of power in deference to the executive. This doctrine stems from the idea that there are cases dealing with subject matters which fall beyond the purview of judicial review. The court's decision to intervene or not is guided by the following four principles enunciated by Judicial Commissioner Sundaresh Menon in Lee Hsien Loong v. Review Publishing Co Ltd (2007):

- Justiciability depends not on the source of the decision-making power, but on the subject-matter that is in question. Where it is the executive that has access to the best materials available to resolve the issue, its views should be regarded as highly persuasive, if not decisive.
- Where the decision involves matters of government policy and requires the intricate balancing of various competing policy considerations that judges are ill-equipped to adjudicate because of their limited training, experience and access to materials, the courts should shy away from reviewing its merits.
- Where a judicial pronouncement could embarrass some other branch of government or tie its hands in the conduct of affairs traditionally regarded as falling within its purview, the courts should abstain from acting.
- In all cases of judicial review, the court should exercise restraint and take cognisance of the fact that the Singapore system of government operates within the framework of three co-equal branches. Even though all exercise of power must be within constitutional and legal bounds, there are areas of prerogative power that the democratically elected executive and legislature are entrusted to take charge of, and, in this regard, it is to the electorate, and not the judiciary, that the executive and legislature are ultimately accountable.

However, areas of high policy such as national security do not automatically apply as a "plea in bar". On scrutiny of such cases which are prima facie non-justiciable, the courts may be able to glean a question of law that is justiciable.

===== Prosecutorial discretion =====
While Article 93 of the Constitution vests judicial power in the courts, Article 35(8) provides that "[t]he Attorney-General shall have power, exercisable at his discretion, to institute, conduct or discontinue any proceedings for any offence". In Tan Guat Neo Phyllis, the High Court stated that these two provisions expressly separate the prosecutorial function from the judicial function, and that they are coequal. As such, the two functions are not to encroach upon each other, although the court may interfere where prosecutorial power has been exercised in bad faith or unconstitutionally.

== Intra-branch checks ==
=== Elected President as a check on the Government ===
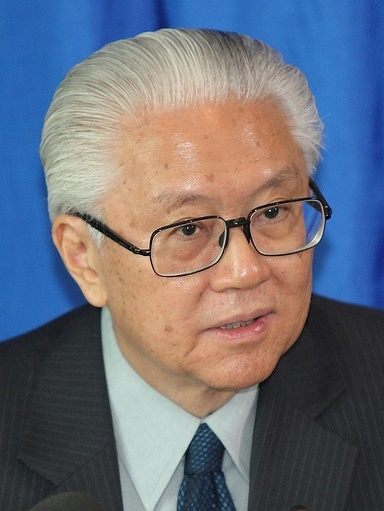
Tony Tan Keng Yam, who was President of Singapore from 2011 to 2017

The office of the Elected President of Singapore represents an indigenisation of the Westminster system of government and is cast as a check against the powers enjoyed by the parliamentary executive, adding to the overall scheme of checks and balances in the doctrine of separation of powers. Nonetheless, the institution has a limited range of functions and is essentially reactive in nature, such that it cannot be seen to be an alternative locus of political power. The President has power to block attempts by the Government to draw down past reserves it did not accumulate, to approve changes to key appointments, and to exercise oversight over the Corrupt Practices Investigation Bureau and decisions of the executive under the ISA and the MRHA. The aim is not to enable the President to target unlawful executive actions, but lawful actions against national interests.

The impetus behind the introduction of the scheme was the Government's perception that there were "inadequate checks in our present parliamentary system of government" as a political party with a parliamentary majority, even of one seat, "can do practically anything it wishes, provided it acts lawfully" in matters pertaining to financial assets and key appointments. It was also thought that it would be prudent to institute a check "while honest men are still in charge". While the objective of protecting against fiscal mismanagement was agreed on, the method of doing so was disputed, with opposition politicians arguing that the parliamentary system would have sufficient checks if opposition parties were allowed to operate more freely and to flourish.

==== Presidential independence ====
To be an effective check, the President must be sufficiently independent and adequately empowered to change or at least block harmful or unsound government policies. Various constitutional provisions seek to achieve this. The President cannot hold any other constitutional office; if a person was an MP prior to being elected as President, the parliamentary seat is to be vacated. To stand as a candidate in a presidential election, a candidate is also required to resign his or her membership in any political party, reflecting the depoliticisation of the elective office. To ensure that the President's watchdog function is unhampered by executive intimidation, the office is maintained out of the Civil List which cannot be diminished during the President's term. The President is also immune from civil suits for acts done in his official capacity.

==== Discretionary powers of the President ====
The President has discretionary power to veto certain executive decisions pertaining primarily to three areas: fiscal management, ensuring meritocracy in a corruption-free civil service, and guardianship over civil liberties where judicial review has been ousted. For the purpose of carrying out his functions, the President is entitled to access to Cabinet papers and may request information concerning the reserves of the Government, or of any statutory board or government company listed in the Fifth Schedule to the Constitution. The relevant minister, or officer of the statutory board or government company, is under a duty to provide such information.

The President, however, does not have the final say over certain decisions, as Parliament may override his veto with a resolution supported by not less than two-thirds of all the elected MPs. For instance, this mechanism applies if the President vetoes key civil service appointments or withholds assent to bills that are likely to draw on the nation's past reserves. A prerequisite for the exercise of the override mechanism is that the President must have disagreed with the recommendation of the Council of Presidential Advisers, which he is required consult before exercising these powers. The override mechanism shows that the President's discretionary powers pose no obstacle to a government which continues to enjoy untrammelled power so long as it controls a clear two-thirds parliamentary majority. The weaker the Government is, the stronger the presidential check is; and the stronger the Government, the weaker the presidential blocking mechanism.

=== Presidential Council of Minority Rights as a check on the legislature ===
Singapore has a unicameral legislature, meaning that there is no division of legislative authority between an upper and a lower house. Nevertheless, the Presidential Council for Minority Rights ("PCMR") can be seen as a quasi-second chamber as it plays a role in legislative review, highlighting bills containing measures that discriminate against racial and religious minorities. Thus, it plays a role in the separation of powers by acting as a check upon the executive and legislature.

However, Parliament can easily circumvent an adverse report on a bill by the PCMR as it can continue to present the bill to the President for assent if not less than two-thirds of all the elected MPs endorse a motion in favour of such action. The PCMR's powers of legislative review are further attenuated because the Constitution designates certain types of bills as falling outside the ambit of its scrutiny, namely, money bills, bills certified by the Prime Minister as affecting "the defence or the security of Singapore" or relating to "public safety, peace or good order in Singapore", and urgent bills. Thus the PCMR has been said to be a weak institution that lacks coercive power.

== See also ==
- Judicial system of Singapore
- Law of Singapore
- Separation of powers
