= Public rights =

In the United States, public rights, as compared to private rights, belong to citizens but are vested in and vindicated by political entities. Public rights cannot be vindicated by private citizens. A right must normally be a private right to be vindicated in court.

An exception to this general proposition is found in Flast v. Cohen, 392 U.S. 83 (1968). In Flast, the U.S. Supreme Court held that a private citizen could challenge the constitutionality of a federal tax if the citizen established "a logical link between [their] status [as a taxpayer] and the type of legislative enactment attacked [and] . . . a nexus between that status and the precise nature of the constitutional infringement alleged."

In Australia, public rights is an entitlement enjoyed by the community, in contrast to a private or personal entitlement. Such as a claim to tolls on a public highway, a right of ferry. Public rights may exist at common law or under statute. For example, the right of access to information held by the government is existing at common law.

== See also ==
- Individual and group rights
