= Private citizen =

Person with no official role

A private citizen is a citizen who does not have an official or professional role in a given situation.

The same person may be a private citizen in one role, and an official in another. For example, a legislator is an official when voting in the legislature, but a private citizen when paying taxes or when undertaking a citizen's arrest in a public place.

A person may remain a de jure private citizen while having considerable political power and influence:

...Pericles, in his capacity as a private citizen, was able to dominate the affairs of the Athenian assembly, and to direct and guide the demos for nearly a generation.

== In law ==
Private citizens in qui tam actions bring suit on behalf of the state but are not officers of the court, and are possibly eligible for a reward.

Private citizens may have the right to make citizen's arrests under certain circumstances, despite not being sworn law-enforcement officials.

Private citizens may have the right to bring citizen suits to enforce a statute.

A government employee may be considered to be a private citizen in the context of law enforcement actions. For example, an emergency medical technician who discovered contraband on a patient was ruled not to be a "government agent" for the purposes of the constitutional restrictions on government searches.

== See also ==
- Private rights
- Idiot § Etymology
