= Private rights =

In the United States, a private right is one that a private citizen can vindicate in court. Compared to public rights, a citizen must be able to show that they have "sustained or is immediately in danger of sustaining some direct injury" and not that they "suffer in some indefinite way in common with people generally." (see Frothingham v. Mellon, 262 U.S. 447, 488 (1923)).

A distinction can be made between criminal rights and private rights, arguing that restrictions against ex post facto laws were not designed to protect citizens' contract rights.
