= Chan Hiang Leng Colin v Public Prosecutor =

1994 Singapore High Court judgment

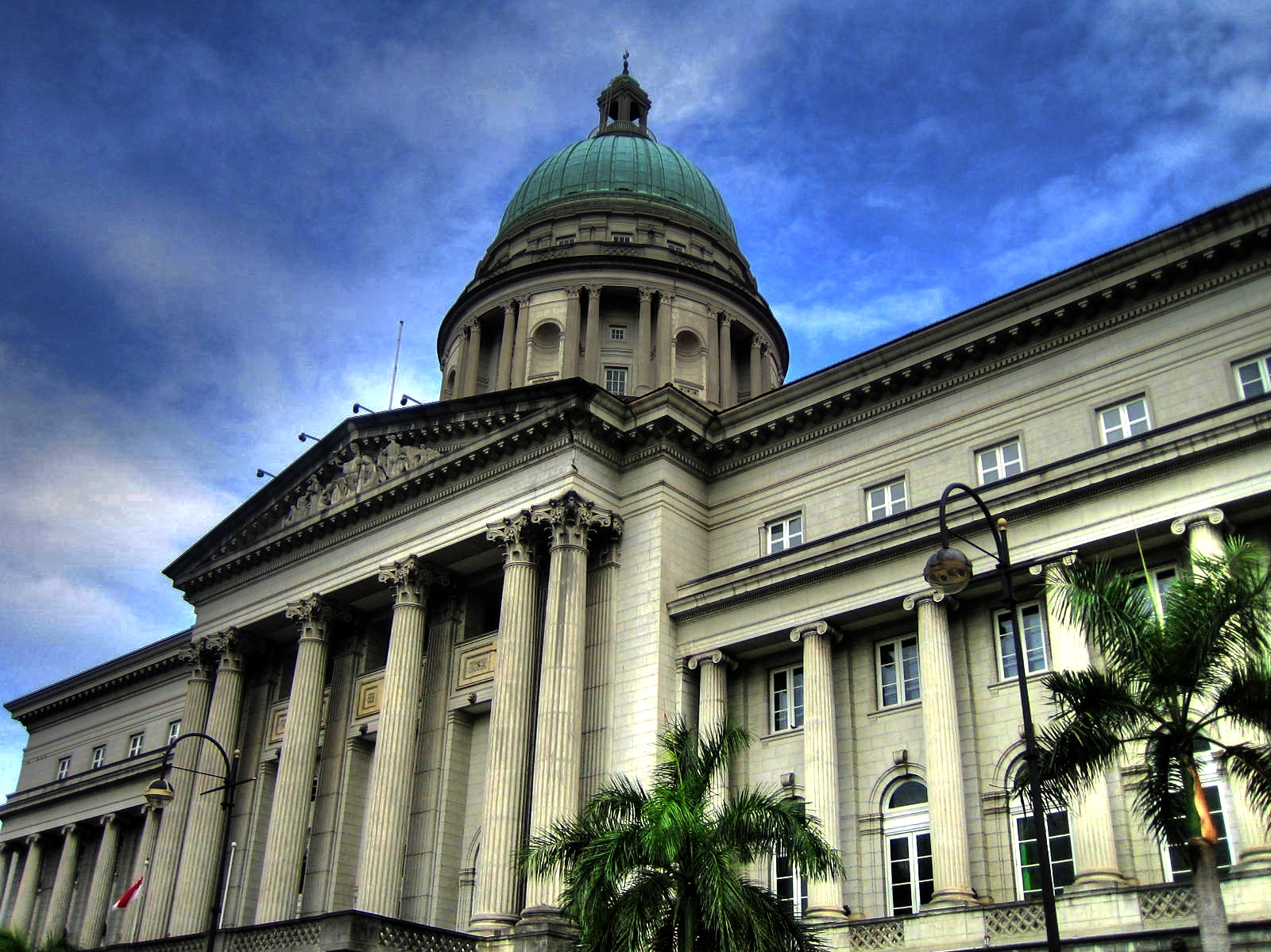
- The Old Supreme Court Building, photographed in April 2007
- Court: High Court of Singapore
- Full case name: Chan Hiang Leng Colin and others v. Public Prosecutor
- Decided: 15 September 1994
- Citations: [1994_SGHC_207.html [1994] SGHC 207] [1994] 3 S.L.R.(R.) 209

Case history
- Prior action: The appellants were convicted in the District Court for possession of banned publications.
- Related actions: Chan Hiang Leng Colin v. Minister for Information and the Arts [1995] 2 S.L.R.(R.) 627, H.C.; [1996] 1 S.L.R.(R.) 294, C.A.

Court membership
- Judge sitting: Yong Pung How C.J.

Case opinions
- The deregistration of the Singapore Congregation of Jehovah's Witnesses and banning of Watch Tower Bible and Tract Society publications are neither unconstitutional nor ultra vires. The right to freedom of religion guaranteed by Article 15(1) of the Constitution can be restricted on the ground of public order.

Chan Hiang Leng Colin v. Public Prosecutor is a 1994 judgment of the High Court of Singapore delivered by Chief Justice Yong Pung How which held that orders issued by the Government deregistering the Singapore Congregation of Jehovah's Witnesses under the Societies Act (Cap. 311, 1985 Rev. Ed.) and banning works published by the Watch Tower Bible and Tract Society ("WTBTS") under the Undesirable Publications Act (Cap. 338, 1985 Rev. Ed.) (now Cap. 338, 1998 Rev. Ed.) did not violate the right to freedom of religion guaranteed by Article 15(1) of the Constitution of Singapore.

The Court said that the constitutionality of the orders had to be presumed, and the appellants bore the burden of establishing that the orders were unconstitutional or ultra vires. The orders had been issued because Jehovah's Witnesses refuse to perform national service, which the Government regarded as contrary to public peace, welfare, and good order. The Court could not question the Government's exercise of discretion in this regard. Thus, the orders were laws relating to public order, which are exceptions to freedom of religion set out in Article 15(4). The Court also emphasized that any religious belief and practice which offends the sovereignty, integrity and unity of Singapore must be restrained. In reaching its decision, the High Court applied a "four walls" approach to interpreting the Constitution and declined to examine foreign case law. There is academic criticism of the fact that the Court interpreted the concept of public order broadly, and did not balance the appellants' fundamental liberties against the public interest.

The High Court also held that the orders were neither irrational nor disproportionate. The order banning all WTBTS publications was reasonable as it would be administratively impossible to monitor any order other than a blanket ban. As for the deregistration order, the Court accepted that the Jehovah's Witnesses' refusal to perform national service prejudiced national security, and was thus appropriately issued in the interest of public order. The Court noted that Singapore's administrative law does not recognize proportionality as a distinct ground of judicial review.

Although the appellants argued that natural justice had been breached because they had not been consulted prior to the issuance of the orders, the High Court observed that where the public interest is at stake the English courts have held that principles of natural justice must apply in a modified manner. In a 1977 case, the Court of Appeal of England and Wales held that the audi alteram partem ("hear the other side") principle did not need to be complied with if the public interest so demanded.

== Facts ==
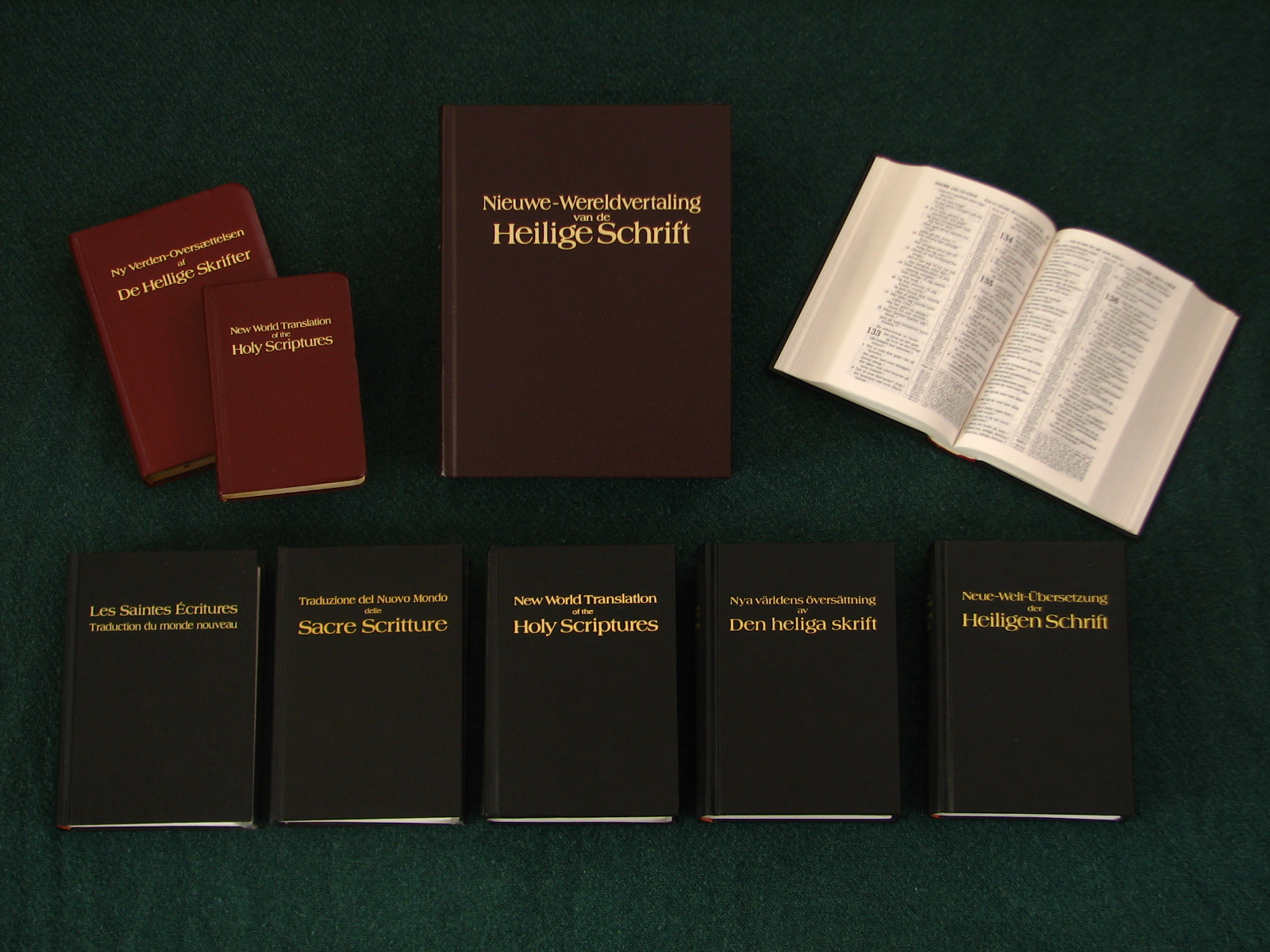
The New World Translation of the Holy Scriptures, published in various languages by the Watch Tower Bible and Tract Society

Jehovah's Witnesses is a Christian denomination whose members refuse to engage in any political or national practices, such as saluting the flag or performing national service. This was deemed prejudicial to the public welfare and good order of Singapore, and on 14 January 1972 the Government issued two orders to deal with the perceived threat to public order. First, Gazette Notification No. 123 of 1972 ("Order 123") was issued by the Minister for Culture pursuant to section 3 of the Undesirable Publications Act ("UPA") to ban works published by the Watch Tower Bible and Tract Society ("WTBTS"), the primary corporation used by Jehovah's Witnesses.

Additionally, Gazette Notification No. 179 of 1972 ("Order 179") by the Minister for Home Affairs ordered the dissolution of the Singapore Congregation of Jehovah's Witnesses pursuant to his powers under section 24(1) of the Societies Act ("SA").

The appellants were Jehovah's Witnesses. On 2 July 1992, police seized publications from them, thirteen of which turned out to be publications prohibited under Order 123. The appellants were charged under Order 123 for possession of publications by the WTBTS, an offence punishable under section 4(2) of the UPA.

== Trial judge's decision ==
The case was first heard in the District Court. The appellants contended by way of a preliminary objection that Order 123 was ultra vires, or beyond the powers, of the UPA and contravened Article 15(1) of the Constitution of Singapore, which enshrines the right to freedom of religion. The trial judge dismissed the preliminary objection, holding that Order 123 was valid and constitutional, as the order concerned the public interest and was permitted under s 3(1) of the UPA. Accordingly, the appellants were convicted for possession of the banned publications. They appealed to the High Court against the trial judge's decision.

== High Court decision ==
=== Grounds of appeal ===
The appellants raised three main grounds of appeal which involved administrative and constitutional law issues:

1. Whether Order 179 was unconstitutional and ultra vires section 24(1)(a) of the SA.
2. Whether Order 123 was ultra vires section 3(1) of the UPA or unconstitutional.
3. Whether Order 123 was unreasonable and disproportionate.

The appeal was heard by Chief Justice Yong Pung How, sitting as a judge of the High Court.

=== Preliminary procedural issue ===
One preliminary issue that the High Court had to determine was whether it could, in its appellate capacity, hear the appeal which involved constitutional matters. The High Court could hear the constitutional issues only in the exercise of its original jurisdiction. However, in the present case the High Court was sitting as an appellate court in a criminal proceeding. The Court, referring to Public Prosecutor v. Lee Meow Sim Jenny (1993), held that its powers were "necessarily limited to that of the Subordinate Court from which the appeal emanated". Since the District Court did not have the power to address the constitutional issues raised, the High Court could not hear the constitutional matters in its appellate capacity.

However, the High Court recognized that both parties had agreed on the Court's competence in determining constitutional issues. The appellants had also raised issues regarding the constitutionality of the government orders, and if the orders proved to be invalid, it would afford the appellants a substantive defence to the criminal charges and would affect the administration of justice. Therefore, the High Court made an exception and heard the case in its appellate jurisdiction. In doing so, the Court emphasized that the constitutional issues raised were of significant importance and the facts of the case were "exceptional".

=== Right to freedom of religion ===
==== Order 179 ====
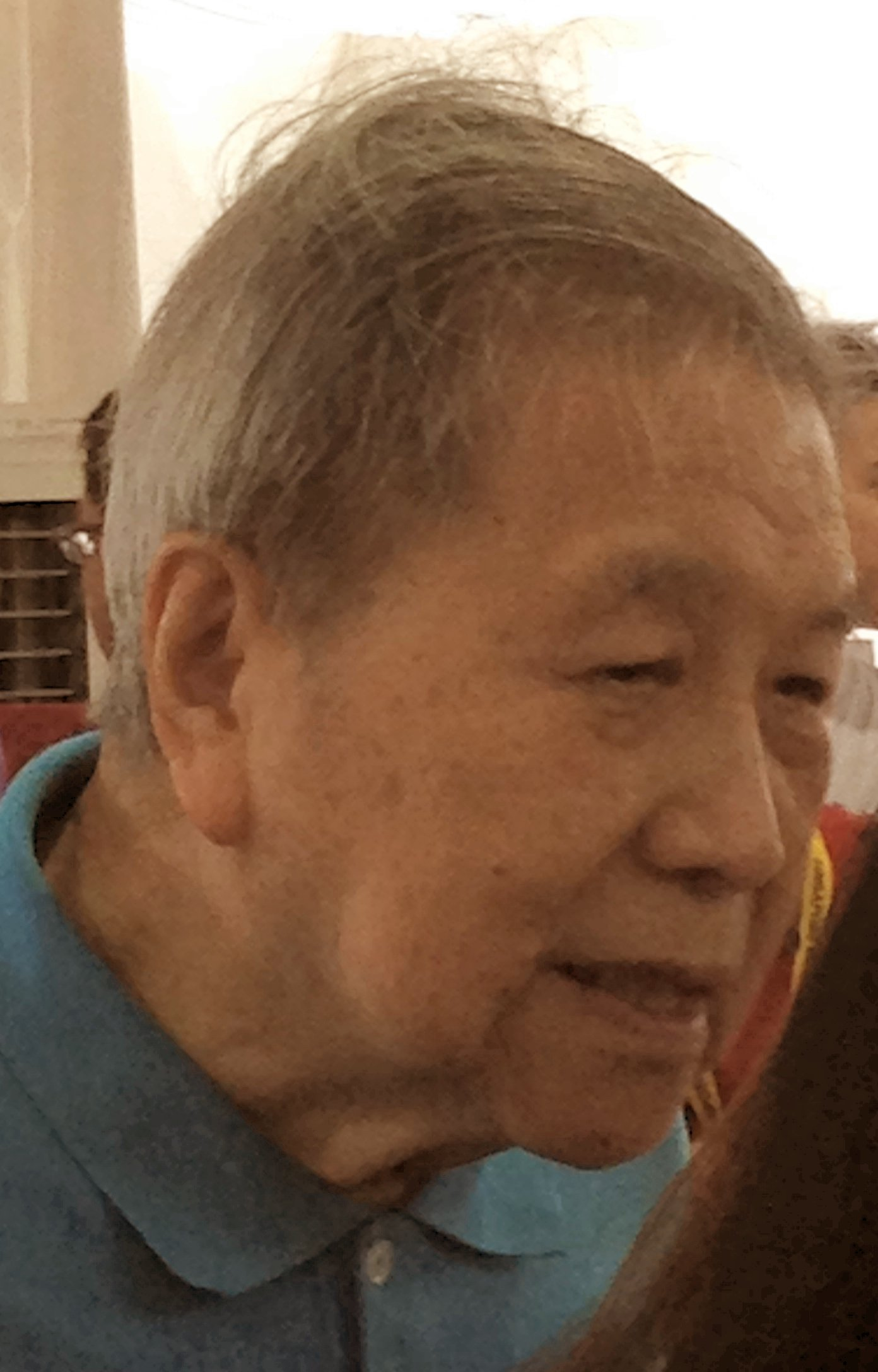
Yong Pung How, then Chief Justice of Singapore, who heard the case in the High Court

At the outset, Chief Justice Yong emphasized that the court would not question the merits of the Minister's exercise of discretion. He stated that "there can be no enquiry as to whether it was a correct or proper exercise or whether it should or ought to have been taken". There was a presumption of constitutionality for the orders, and the burden was on the appellants to prove that they were unconstitutional or ultra vires.

The appellants contended that under Article 15(4) of the Constitution restrictions on the right of freedom of religion could be imposed only if public order, public health or morality is affected, and section 24(1)(a) of the SA provides for registered organizations to be dissolved only if they threaten public peace, welfare or good order. The appellants therefore submitted that there had to be a clear and immediate danger to public order before freedom of religion can be circumscribed. Since the activities of Jehovah's Witnesses posed no such threat, the deregistration order was unconstitutional and ultra vires the SA.

However, Chief Justice Yong rejected the appellants' argument and held that Order 179 was constitutional. The mere "possibility of trouble over religious beliefs" was held to be sufficient cause for the Minister to take action. To this end, the danger did not have to be clear and immediate.

Chief Justice Yong held that any religious belief and practice which offended the "sovereignty, integrity and unity of Singapore" must be restrained. While there was no dispute that Jehovah's Witnesses were law-abiding citizens and their religious activities held no political agendas, their refusal to perform national service was, in the Minister's view, contrary to public peace, welfare and good order. In this regard, Chief Justice Yong considered the concerns of the assistant director of Manpower of the Ministry of Defence – if the beliefs of Jehovah's Witnesses were recognized, a select group of people would enjoy the social and economic benefits of their country without having to share the responsibility of defending the community's social and political institutions.

Since the court had no capacity to review the merits of the decision and conclude whether Jehovah's Witnesses were a threat to public order, it was sufficient that the Minister had made Order 179 with the view that the existence of Jehovah's Witnesses, which forbade national service, was contrary to public peace, welfare and good order. The judge also remarked that notion of public peace, welfare and good order in the SA was similar to the concept of public order envisaged by Article 15(4) of the Constitution. Thus the rationale of maintaining public order behind Order 179 fell within the permitted categories spelt out in both section 24(1)(a) of the SA and Article 15(4) respectively.

==== Order 123 ====
Section 3(1) of the UPA confers a discretion on the Minister to prohibit any publication if he opines that it is contrary to the public interest. Again, the High Court held that it would not review the merits of the ministerial discretion. Since the Minister had decided that the existence of Jehovah's Witnesses would be "prejudicial to public welfare and good order", which clearly related to the public interest, Order 123 was based upon relevant considerations and not ultra vires section 3(1) of the UPA. Moreover, Chief Justice Yong felt that Order 123 sought to reinforce the ban on the Jehovah's Witnesses' movement effected by Order 179. Hence, the appellants' constitutional and administrative challenges were dismissed on the basis that once the executive's considerations were in relation to public interest, "there could therefore be no objection that the prohibition order was made on an irrelevant ground".

==== Evaluation of the High Court's ruling on the freedom of religion ====
===== Minister's subjective discretion =====
In Thio Li-ann's view, it appears that the High Court allowed the matter to be decided according to the subjective discretion of the Minister. The only explanation given for deregistration was that the Jehovah's Witnesses' refusal to perform national service was contrary to the public interest. The Court did not require the executive to elaborate on exactly how a failure to perform national service would be contrary to public interest. It accepted the executive's discretion to derogate a fundamental right without a close scrutiny of the executive's rationale and explanations.

===== Interpretation of exceptions =====
Article 15(1) of the Constitution lays down the general principle guaranteeing the freedom of religion, while Article 15(4) allows an exception to the general principle if any religious act is contrary to any general law relating to public order, health or morality. In Chan Hiang Leng Colin, Chief Justice Yong stated that acts flowing from religious beliefs must "conform" to general legislation. This implies that legislation derogating from rights is presumptively constitutional, and Article 15(4) restrictions take precedence over fundamental liberties. Thio has criticized this, stating that "exceptions swallowing up general principles can make a mockery of any constitutional liberty".

Although the Court held that the activities of the Jehovah's Witnesses were against "public order", Chief Justice Yong did not explain in detail how such activities disrupted public order. The term public order was also not defined in the judgment. Counsel for the appellants cited the Malaysian case Tan Boon Liat v. Menteri Hal Ehwal Dalam Negeri, Malaysia (1976), in which the meaning of public order in section 4(1) of the Emergency (Public Order and Prevention of Crime) Ordinance 1969 was described as follows:

The expression 'public order' is not defined anywhere but danger to human life and safety and the disturbance of public tranquillity must necessarily fall within the purview of the expression ... [T]he test to be adopted in determining whether an act affects law and order or public order is this: Does it lead to disturbance of the current of life of the community so as to amount to disturbance of the public order or does it affect merely an individual leaving the tranquility of the society undisturbed?

While Chief Justice Yong acknowledged counsel's submissions, he did not address the suggested test. Instead, he discredited the "clear and immediate danger test" by remarking that for any administration to allow the possibility of trouble over religious beliefs to exist and wait until trouble is about to break out before taking action would be "pathetically naive" and "grossly incompetent".

Thio has argued that this "nip it in the bud" approach spells dire consequences for the preservation of civil liberties. She notes that this "exaltation of efficiency over all other interests" creates a mala fides ("bad faith") situation which allows for the relevant decision-makers to simply point to a lower standard of a "possibility" of trouble before curtailing a constitutional liberty. She advocates that at least a certain degree of possible danger must be established prior to such a curtailment of rights. Otherwise, rights would flow from the state instead of flowing from something intrinsic to one's humanity, and this judicial treatment results in a "flimsy basis for human rights".

Thio has also commented that the case seems to enunciate a more extensive conception of "public order", since this required the curtailing of a "passive threat" to a governmental policy considered to be the "cornerstone of national security".

The Court did not conduct any balancing exercise in weighing the appellants' fundamental liberties against the public interest. Instead, it adopted a categorization approach in which the presence of any factor indicated in Article 15(4) of the Constitution is accepted as conclusive regardless of its impact on public order. This reveals a judicial deference to the ministerial judgment in issuing orders curtailing constitutional liberties. In this case, the "right of religious freedom was not given due weight" as there was no judicial pronouncement on the value of one's religion. Thio has commented that in Singapore, utilitarian rather than dignitarian considerations pervade judicial reasoning. By subscribing to ministerial discretion, the court abdicates its "watchdog role over individual rights".

=== Unreasonableness and disproportionality ===
The blanket ban on all WTBTS publications by Order 23 was alleged by the appellants to be unreasonable and excessive. Their counsel contended that WTBTS produced publications that were not contrary to public interest, such as the King James Bible. However, all publications by WTBTS were banned under Order 123 regardless of their content.

The High Court held that the Minister's order to prohibit all publications by WTBTS was not excessive. Any order other than a total blanket order would have been impossible to monitor administratively. Therefore, the fact that the contents of one publication were unobjectionable did not, by itself, make the ban unreasonable.

Chief Justice Yong also held that the orders were not irrational or disproportionate. He accepted the Minister's view that the Jehovah's Witnesses' refusal to perform national service was prejudicial to national security. The activities of the Jehovah's Witnesses had been properly restricted on the basis that they were against "public order", and the prohibition on their publications was a natural consequence in view of the "public interest".

Citing Chng Suan Tze v. Minister for Home Affairs (1988), the High Court in Chan Hiang Leng Colin affirmed that disproportionality was not an independent ground of judicial review, and any issue of proportionality was subsumed under the ground of irrationality. Therefore, the Court gave no consideration to whether the publication ban was unreasonable or over-inclusive.

Thio Li-ann has criticized the Court's prioritization of administrative convenience and efficiency over individual fundamental rights. She has argued that this has allowed "state interests to trump rights rather than vice versa". This means that so long as the Minister's motives for the orders were "based on national security considerations and good order, the nature of the ban or its scope is apparently not reviewable". This "manifested a clear bias towards bureaucratic concerns", and gave the Minister excessive power.

Thio has also questioned the impossibility of ascertaining whether each WTBTS publication constitutes a threat to public order. She was personally informed by Colin Chan, the lead appellant in the case, that the Jehovah's Witnesses' publishing arm publishes only three works a year. Hence, in the case "there appears to be an overriding concern for efficiency over fairness".

=== Fettering of discretion ===
The appellants contended that Minister had fettered his discretion when making Order 123. They alleged that publications had been banned because of the deregistration of the Jehovah's Witnesses and not because Minister had been satisfied of their undesirability.

Chief Justice Yong, referring to the affidavit of the Minister for Culture, held that Order 123 was made after the Government had been satisfied that the teachings and beliefs contained in publications of the WTBTS were contrary to the public interest. The Minister had viewed the teachings of Jehovah's Witnesses as being prejudicial to the Government's nation-building efforts, and hence he had rightly exercised his discretion to prohibit such publications.

=== Breach of natural justice ===
One of the submissions raised by the appellants was that the prohibition and deregistration orders were made in breach of the natural justice principle of audi alteram partem, or "hear the other side". This is regarded as a cardinal principle of natural justice, requiring that no person shall be condemned unless he or she has been given prior notice of the allegations against him or her and a fair opportunity to be heard. In general, Article 12(1) of the Constitution protects rights such as this. Audi alteram partem has been referred to by the Court of Appeal as one of the two rules that make up the administrative law rules of natural justice, the other being nemo iudex in causa sua ("no man a judge in his own cause").

The appellants contended that the orders had been made without any notice or hearing, and they were not given an opportunity to explain or correct the allegations against them. This was contrary to natural justice, which requires a person to be given the right to be heard before his or her interest is violated. As natural justice is an essential aspect of both the rule of law and the equal treatment by the law of all persons, the appellants argued that the deprivation of their right to a fair hearing was a violation of Article 12(1) of the Constitution, which affords to all persons equality before the law and equal protection of the law.

First, the High Court held, upon an examination of section 3 of the UPA and section 24(1) of the SA, that there was no express requirement for the Minister to have given the affected parties a right to be heard before the orders were made. Further, there was no room for the appellants' contention that the principles of natural justice had to be complied with fully. The orders had been made with respect to both the public interest and the public order, and their objective was clearly the preservation of national security. The Court affirmed the conclusion of Lord Denning, the Master of the Rolls, in R. v. Secretary of State for Home Affairs, ex parte Hosenball (1977) that in such situations the ordinary principles of natural justice have to be modified to accommodate the public interest.

In ex parte Hosenball, Lord Denning referred to Lord Reid's comments in R. v. Lewes Justices, ex parte Secretary of State for Home Department (1972), that there was a public interest for certain documents in the police's possession not to be produced during court proceedings, otherwise members of the public might withhold information from the police if they realized the potential existed for the information to be disclosed to the Gaming Board. Such withholding of information would prevent the police from properly discharging their statutory duty of ensuring that unsuitable persons were not granted licences to run gaming establishments. Lord Reid stated that the requirement for natural justice in that case was clearly outweighed by the public interest.

The Minister had decided that the Jehovah's Witnesses' doctrine prohibiting its adherents from taking part in military service was contrary to national security and, thus, to public order and the public interest. Notably, the Court held that because the basis for the Minister's conclusion clearly could not be disputed, there was no need for any hearing or inquiry as no purpose would have been achieved. The appellants had not shown that the Minister had based his conclusions on false or unfounded facts; thus, unless the conclusions were irrelevant, the Court could not interfere with the Minister's opinion since his discretionary power had been exercised within statutory limitations.

It has been argued, however, that there exists a problem if a government minister simply needs to state that a national security interest is involved in a matter, upon which the rules of natural justice are immediately compromised. Thio Li-ann has commented that when important constitutional rights such as the freedom to religion are curtailed by legislation, it may be advisable for the court to impose a duty on a public authority to give reasons establishing that an order imposed by the authority is objectively valid.

=== Treatment of foreign jurisprudence: the "four walls" doctrine ===
The appellants also contended that the ban was a violation of the international declarations of human rights. The High Court held that the issues would be best resolved by a "consideration of the provisions of the Constitution, the Societies Act and the UPA alone". Consequently, there was no consideration of international declarations of human rights in the judgment. Instead, Chief Justice Yong endorsed the "four walls" approach applied in Government of the State of Kelantan v. Government of the Federation of Malaya (1963). and imported the principle into the common law of Singapore. In Kelantan, Chief Justice Thomson had commented that:

[T]he Constitution is primarily to be interpreted within its own four walls and not in the light of analogies drawn from other countries such as Great Britain, the United States of America or Australia.

Chief Justice Yong noted that the "social conditions" in Singapore were "markedly different" from those in the US, concluding, "[o]n this basis alone, I am not influenced by the various views as enunciated in the American cases cited to me but instead must restrict my analysis of the issues here with reference to the local context." He went on to reject the American cases dealing with freedom of religion on the basis that the Singapore Constitution did not prohibit the "establishment' of any religion unlike the American Constitution which had an anti-establishment clause. Nonetheless, the Chief Justice went on to approve an Australian case, Adelaide Company of Jehovah's Witnesses Inc. v. Commonwealth of Australia (1943), with respect to limitations on the religious freedom of Jehovah's Witnesses. This may imply that Singapore courts embrace foreign cases "selectively".

The four walls doctrine has been invoked in subsequent cases. In Nappalli Peter Williams v. Institute of Technical Education (1998), Justice Tan Lee Meng recognized that "there are differences between the American position and the Singapore constitution and that social conditions in Singapore are markedly different from those in the United States". However, no explanation was given as to how the social conditions are different. The judge went on to approve foreign cases to buttress his argument. Hence it appears that the four walls doctrine "is sometimes used as a device for rejecting certain lines of foreign authority while accepting others".

In comparison, there was more active judicial engagement with international law in Nguyen Tuong Van v. Public Prosecutor (2005), as opposed to the decisive disapproval in Chan Hiang Leng Colin. In Nguyen Tuong Van, the Court of Appeal commented that a "clearly and firmly established" rule of customary international law can be adopted by the courts, but if there is a conflict between such a rule and a domestic statute, the latter takes precedence. The Court analysed whether there was an established international norm against execution by hanging before deciding if should be applied in Singapore, revealing a more open-minded approach to international law.

== Social implications of the case ==
Amnesty International has noted that the Jehovah's Witnesses are deemed to be a "potential threat to public order and peace" in Singapore, and are subject to imprisonment and fines for refusing to serve national service and distributing prohibited publications. As a result, Jehovah's Witnesses live under a "constant fear of being arrested, of losing their jobs, not getting business licenses or government flats, and fearing their children will face trouble in school". However, it has been asserted that religions with pacifist tenets are not predisposed to the kind of violence that would normally be associated with a threat to public peace.

During the Second Reading of the Maintenance of Religious Harmony Bill (later enacted as the Maintenance of Religious Harmony Act) in Parliament on 23 February 1990, Lee Hsien Loong, who was then the Minister for Trade and Industry and Second Minister for Defence (Services), said that Jehovah's Witnesses object to armed national service as a matter of conscience due to their faith, but Singapore cannot accept conscientious objection because this will lead to a slippery slope – more people will object to national service based on religious and "conscience" reasons, and this will result in a breakdown in the system of national service.

It has been said that Jehovah's Witnesses do not entirely oppose the idea of national service, but rather the notion of armed military service. Thio Li-ann has commented that it may be administratively possible to devise a non-military national service for Jehovah's Witnesses, who are very few in number.

== See also ==
- Article 15 of the Constitution of Singapore
- Persecution of Jehovah's Witnesses in Singapore
