= Article 15 of the Constitution of Singapore =

Guarantee of the freedom of religion

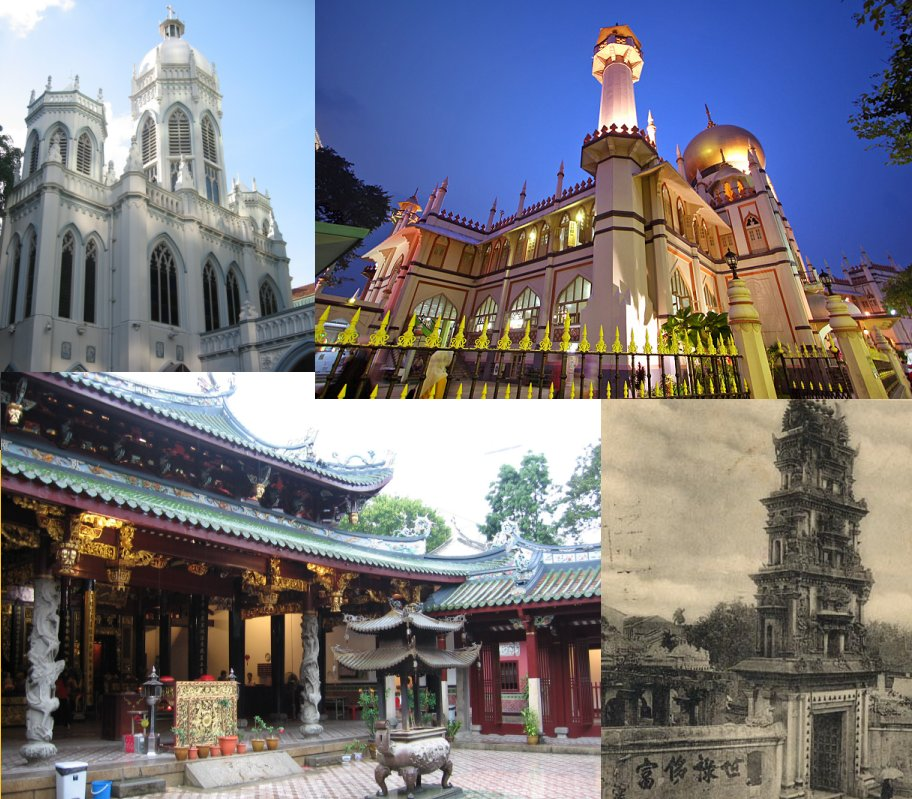
Religious buildings in Singapore. Clockwise from top left: Saint Joseph's Church, Masjid Sultan, Sri Mariamman Temple and Thian Hock Keng.

Article 15 of the Constitution of the Republic of Singapore guarantees freedom of religion in Singapore. Specifically, Article 15(1) states: "Every person has the right to profess and practise his religion and to propagate it."

The terms profess, practise and propagate are not defined in the Constitution, but cases from Singapore and other jurisdictions may shed light on their meaning. The word profess in relation to a religion was defined in a 1964 Singapore case not involving the Constitution as meaning "to affirm, or declare one's faith in or allegiance to". A 2001 Malaysian decision suggested that the profession of religion does not encompass the renunciation of a religion or the profession of an irreligious viewpoint. As regards the word propagate, in 1977 the Supreme Court of India held that it confers on an individual the right to transmit or spread his or her religion by an exposition of its tenets, but not the right to convert another person who holds a pre-existing religious belief to one's own religion. These issues have not yet come before the Singapore courts for determination. On the other hand, in 1999 the Court of Appeal attempted to draw a line between religious practices and secular facts, taking the view that singing the National Anthem and saying the National Pledge were the latter. Thus, rules that compelled a teacher to engage in these activities in an educational institution could not be regarded as having infringed his right to practise his religion.

Freedom of religion under Article 15(1) is not absolute as it is qualified by Article 15(4) of the Constitution, which provides that the rights secured by Article 15 do not authorize any act contrary to any general law relating to public order, public health or morality. These limitations upon the freedom of religion are an important aspect of Singapore's secularism. The Singapore courts have interpreted the term public order to be equivalent to the concepts of "public peace, welfare and good order" referred to in section 24(1)(a) of the Societies Act (Cap. 311, 1985 Rev. Ed.), rather than taking the narrower view that public order means freedom from unlawful physical violence. There has also been academic criticism of the fact that the courts have not applied any form of balancing test to determine whether freedom of religion has been reasonably restricted. On the contrary, where national security is said to be involved, the courts have deferred to the Government as to the necessity for the restrictive legislation. The terms public health and morality in Article 15(4) have yet to be judicially interpreted.

== Text of Article 15 ==
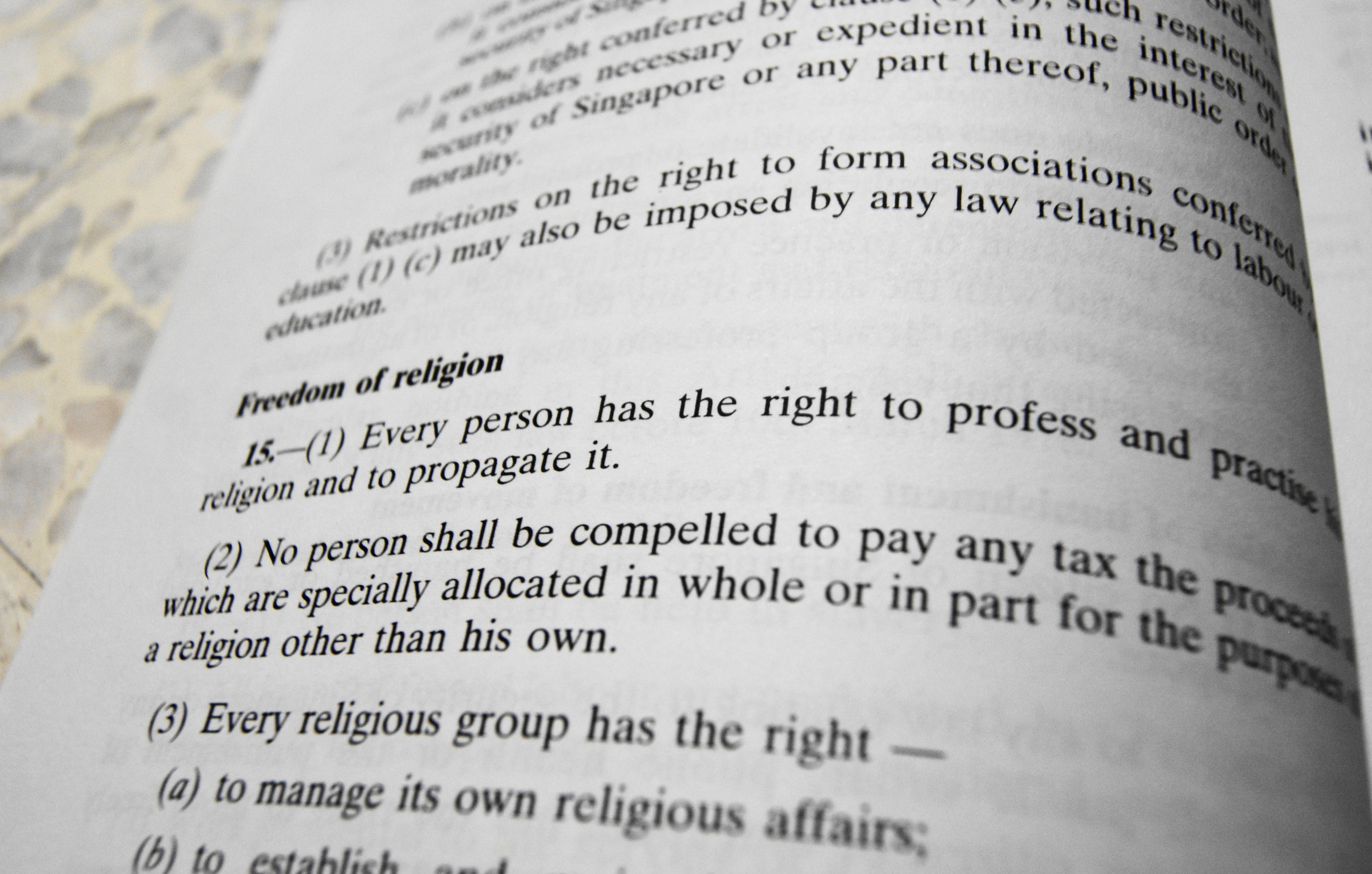
Article 15 in a copy of the 1999 Reprint of the Constitution of Singapore

Article 15 of the Constitution of the Republic of Singapore is entitled "Freedom of religion" and reads as follows:

15.— (1) Every person has the right to profess and practise his religion and to propagate it.

(2) No person shall be compelled to pay any tax the proceeds of which are specially allocated in whole or in part for the purposes of a religion other than his own.

(3) Every religious group has the right —

(a) to manage its own religious affairs;
(b) to establish and maintain institutions for religious or charitable purposes; and
(c) to acquire and own property and hold and administer it in accordance with law.

(4) This Article does not authorise any act contrary to any general law relating to public order, public health or morality.

In Nappalli Peter Williams v. Institute of Technical Education (1999), the Court of Appeal affirmed that the Constitution generally adopts what is known as accommodative secularism by "removing restrictions to one's choice of religious belief".

Article 15(1) is in pari materia with Article 11(1) of the Constitution of Malaysia, from which it was adopted following Singapore's independence from Malaysia in 1965. The latter states: "Every person has the right to profess and practice his religion and, subject to clause (4), to propagate it." Article 15(1) also contains similarities to Article 25(1) of the Constitution of India: "Subject to public order, morality and health and to the other provisions of this Part, all persons are equally entitled to freedom of conscience and the right freely to profess, practise and propagate religion."

== Meaning of profess, practise and propagate ==
=== Profess ===
The word profess in Article 15(1) is not defined in the Constitution, but the case Re Mohamed Said Nabi, deceased (1964) may provide guidance. The issue in the case was the meaning of the word Muslim in the Muslims Ordinance 1957 which was defined as "a person who professes the religion of Islam". The High Court held that to come within the definition, one must be shown to be an orthodox Muslim and must have outwardly manifested and practised Islam; merely having been born into that religion was insufficient. More specifically, Justice F.A. Chua referred to the Shorter Oxford English Dictionary and noted that the word profess means "to affirm, or declare one's faith in or allegiance to (a religion, principle, God or Saint etc.)".

However, to determine if one has in fact "professed" a religion, a proper scrutiny of the entire circumstances is necessary. On the facts, the deceased was brought up as a Muslim, married under Muslim rites, and had held Muslim religious ceremonies in his house which he had taken part in. This was strong evidence that he professed the religion of Islam, despite the fact that he had also engaged in the heterodox practices of drinking alcohol and eating pork. The judge held that such practices did not amount to a renunciation of the religion, and added that someone who had been born into the religion must be held to be a member of that religion unless it is proved he has adopted some other religion.

The Malaysian interpretation of the term profess in Article 11(1) of the Malaysian Constitution may be relevant as that provision is worded similarly to Article 15(1) of the Singapore Constitution. In Daud bin Mamat v. Majlis Agama Islam (2001), it was held that the act of exiting one's religion does not fall under the meaning of professing and practising one's religion. In the judge's view, "to accept that professing no religion equated to 'a religion' or the 'right to profess and practice it' would stretch the definition in Article 11 too far". On the other hand, it might be argued that the freedom to renounce one's religion or to profess not to have a religion is a corollary of the freedom to profess a religion. This issue has not yet come before the Singapore courts for determination.

=== Practise ===
The Constitution is also silent on what constitutes practising a religion for the purposes of Article 15(1). The local courts have defined the word practise by indicating what types of acts are not considered religious practices. In Nappalli, the Court of Appeal held that singing of the National Anthem and reciting the National Pledge were not religious practices but rather expressions of national patriotism, which were secular acts. The Canadian case Donald v. The Board of Education for the City of Hamilton (1945) was distinguished; in that case, singing the national anthem was held to constitute a religious practice because the anthem contained a prayer hymn which "unquestionably reflected some religious character".

In Nappalli, the appellant was dismissed from an educational institution for his refusal to participate in the aforementioned acts. Central to his claim was the submission that these acts were religious practices that went against his belief as a Jehovah's Witness and thus infringed his constitutional right to practice and profess his religion guaranteed by Article 15. However, the Court held that since "religion" in Singapore under the Constitution is restricted to "a citizen's faith in a personal God" and does not include "a system of belief in one's own country", the acts in question were not religious practices. Hence, the appellant's rights had not been contravened. The Court took the view that "the appellant's interpretation of the pledge and anthem ceremony as a religious ceremony was a distortion of secular fact into religious belief". If the appellant's interpretation was correct, this would result in Article 15(1) losing operative effect, for "[h]ow can the same Constitution guarantee religious freedom if, by asking citizens to pledge their allegiance to country, it is (as the appellant suggests) coercing participation in a religious ceremony? This excruciatingly absurd interpretation cannot have been what was envisaged by the authors of the Constitution."

The courts in Malaysia have taken a similar approach in defining the meaning of religious practice under Article 11 of the Malaysian Constitution. They have also consulted religious texts to determine what type of acts might constitute religious practices. In Halimatussaadiah v. Public Service Commission, Malaysia (1992), the appellant claimed she had been wrongfully dismissed from her employment due to her refusal to comply with employment conditions that prohibited any attire that covered a female public servant's face while on duty. According to the appellant, this contravened her right to religious practice on grounds that the wearing of the purdah was part of her religious practice as a Muslim. However, the court disagreed and held that the purdah was not considered a religious practice as it was not a requirement under Islam since there was no express mention of such a requirement in the Quran.

However, in the Philippines, the courts have accorded the individual autonomy to decide what constitutes religious practice. It is up to the individual to decide what constitutes religious practice so long as such acts do not offend public interest. This was the view proffered in Ebralinag v. Superintendent of Schools of Cebu (1993), in which the issue was whether the petitioners, who were Jehovah's Witnesses, ought to be expelled from schools for refusing to salute the flag, sing the national anthem and recite the oath of allegiance as required by the Republic Act No. 1265 of 11 July 1955 and other legislation. Cruz J. held that the state could not interpret the Bible for the petitioners as "only they can read it as they see fit. Right or wrong, the meaning they derive from it cannot be revised or reversed except perhaps by their own acknowledged superiors. But certainly not the State. It has no competence in this matter."

=== Propagate ===
Singapore courts have not yet interpreted the word propagate in Article 15(1) of the Constitution.

Article 25(1) of the Indian Constitution, which is in the same terms as in Article 15(1) of the Singapore Constitution, guarantees to individuals the right to freely "profess, practise and propagate" their religions. The term propagate was considered by the Supreme Court of India in Stanislaus v. State of Madhya Pradesh (1977). The Court adopted a dictionary definition of propagate, which was "to transmit or spread from person to person or from place to place". Accordingly, it held that the word as used in Article 25(1) confers on an individual the right to transmit or spread one's religion by an exposition of its tenets. In other words, an individual has the right to spread his or her religion by explaining to others the principles and beliefs underlying that particular religion. However, in the Court's opinion Article 25(1) does not confer the right to convert another person who holds a pre-existing religious belief to one's own religion as this would impinge on the "freedom of conscience" provided for in the Article, which accords each individual with the freedom to hold or consider a thought, fact or viewpoint independent from those of others. In short, the constitutional right to propagate one's own religion is protected insofar as an individual who exercises this right respects the freedom of persons following other religions. The Indian jurist Hormasji Maneckji Seervai has criticized Stanislaus and has said it should be overruled. He argued that when a person propagates his religion to another, that act does not violate the other person's free conscience but allows that person an opportunity to freely choose a religion:

The right to propagate religion gives a meaning to freedom of choice, for choice involves not only knowledge but an act of will. A person cannot choose if he does not know what choices are open to him. To propagate religion is not to impart knowledge and to spread it more widely, but to produce intellectual and moral conviction leading to action, namely, the adoption of that religion. Successful propagation of religion would result in conversion.

== Restrictions on the freedom of religion ==
Under Article 15(4) of the Constitution, a person's freedom of religion can be restricted by a general law relating to public order, public health or morality. The term general law is not defined in the Constitution, but may refer to a law that applies to all persons or places belonging to a particular class.

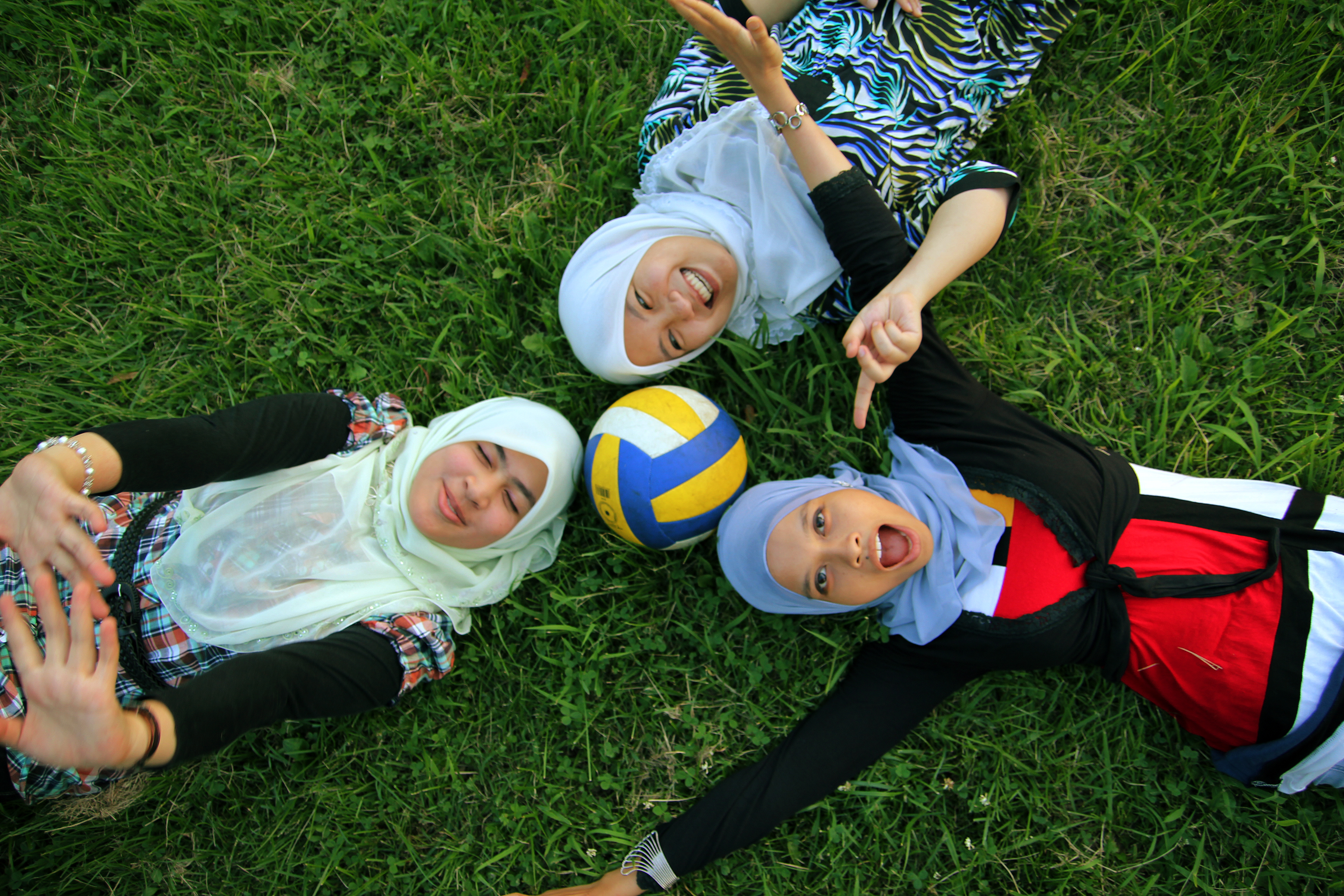
Three Malay Muslim girls wearing tudungs (Islamic headscarves). Due to the Government's insistence on secularism, tudungs may not be worn in Singapore's primary schools of a public character.

The restrictions on freedom of religion are an important reflection of Singapore's secularism. Although the Constitution does not express the doctrine of secularism explicitly, the report of the 1966 Constitutional Commission described Singapore as a "democratic secular state". Singapore's secularism is similar to France's secularism in that both models seek to "protect the state from religion". However, unlike in Singapore, the principle of secularism in France is constitutionally expressed. In being secular, the Government of Singapore does not reject religion. Instead, it has been said to practise "accommodative secularism".

The Government's adherence to secularism has been criticized in that the unwritten principle of secularism has trumped the constitutional protection of freedom of religion. For instance, in 2002 a controversy arose upon the suspension of four Muslim girls from school when their parents insisted that they wear the tudung (Islamic headscarf) to national schools. Section 61 of the Education Act empowers the Minister for Education to regulate schools, including prohibiting students from wearing anything not forming part of an official school uniform. The parents of the schoolgirls took the view that the Ministry of Education's school uniform policy was unconstitutional as it violated the girls' freedom of religion under Article 15(1). While the parents eventually did not pursue legal proceedings against the Ministry, the controversy showed the Singapore Government's steadfastness in insisting on secularism and the difficulties in reconciling secularism and freedom of religion in Singapore.

=== Meaning of public order, public health and morality ===
==== Public order ====
The term public order is not defined in the Constitution but has been judicially deliberated in a series of important legal cases involving the Singapore Congregation of Jehovah's Witnesses.

In Chan Hiang Leng Colin v. Public Prosecutor (1994), the Minister of Home Affairs had deregistered the Jehovah's Witnesses by Order No. 179/1972 made pursuant to section 24(1)(a) of the Societies Act. This provision allows for the dissolution of registered organizations considered to be threats to public peace, welfare or good order. The Minister had also made Order No. 123/1972 and Order No. 405/1994 pursuant to section 3(1) of the Undesirable Publications Act, prohibiting publications by the Watch Tower Bible and Tract Society relating to the Jehovah's Witnesses. The appellants were convicted in a district court for possession of prohibited publications. They appealed and sought to challenge the constitutionality of the Minister's prohibition order and the deregistration of the Jehovah's Witnesses, arguing that their right to freedom of religion guaranteed by Article 15(1) of the Constitution had been infringed.

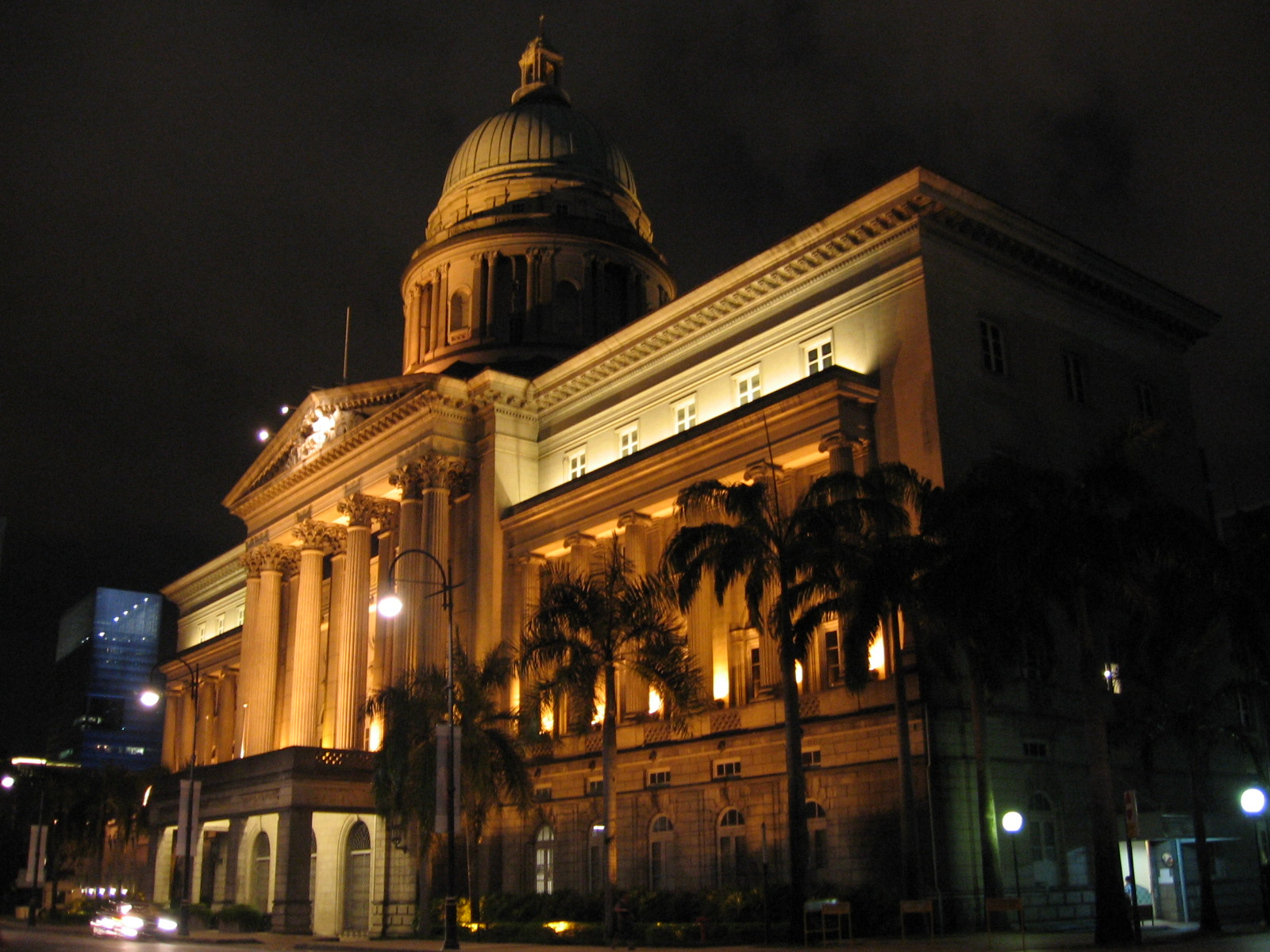
The Old Supreme Court Building, where the Court of Appeal and High Court sat until moving to a new building in 2005. In a 1994 case, the High Court equated public order in Article 15(4) of the Constitution with "public peace, welfare and good order" in s 24(1)(a) of the Societies Act, rather than holding that public order is threatened by unlawful physical violence.

Counsel for the appellants submitted that the Jehovah's Witnesses in Singapore were a small, non-violent group and that there was no evidence their activities were against public order in any manner. He relied on the Malaysian case Tan Boon Liat v. Menteri Hal Ehwal Dalam Negeri, Malaysia (1976), which considered the meaning of public order in the context of section 4(1) of the Emergency (Public Order and Prevention of Crime) Ordinance 1969 (Malaysia):

The expression 'public order' is not defined anywhere but danger to human life and safety and the disturbance of public tranquillity must necessarily fall within the purview of the expression ... [T]he test to be adopted in determining whether an act affects law and order or public order is this: Does it lead to disturbance of the current of life of the community so as to amount to disturbance of the public order or does it affect merely an individual leaving the tranquillity of the society undisturbed?

Chief Justice Yong Pung How rejected this conception of public order. He noted that Singapore had a policy of compulsory military service known as National Service, and that the Minister had taken the view that the continued existence of the Singapore Congregation of Jehovah's Witnesses, which held the belief that military service was forbidden, was contrary to public peace, welfare and good order. As such, since the Minister had formed the view that the Jehovah's Witnesses were a threat to national security, it was not open to the court to take a different view on the matter. Yong C.J. said in his judgement: "I could not see how the concept of public order as envisaged under Art 15(4) is dissimilar to the notion of public peace, welfare and good order within s 24(1)(a) of the Societies Act." He emphasized that the right to religious freedom was not an absolute right as it was subject to the inherent limitations set out in Article 15(4). The right of freedom of religion had to be reconciled with the "right of the state to employ the sovereign power to ensure peace, security and orderly living, without which the constitutional guarantee of civil liberty would be a mockery". Accordingly, the appeal was dismissed.

In 1995, the Minister for Information and the Arts made Order No. 405/1995 banning materials published by the International Bible Students Association, an organization associated with the Jehovah's Witnesses. In Chan Hiang Leng Colin v. Minister for Information and the Arts (1995), the plaintiffs sought leave to apply for an order of certiorari to quash the order, alleging that it was ultra vires as it contravened, among other things, Article 15(1) of the Constitution. Presiding over the case in the High Court, Justice Judith Prakash referred to Yong C.J.'s holding in Chan Hiang Leng Colin v. P.P. (1994) concerning the meaning of public order.

In a 1995 commentary on Chan Hiang Leng Colin v. P.P. (1994), Professor Thio Li-ann noted that in other jurisdictions a lack of public order includes the notion of "endangerment to human life and safety as well as the disruption of public tranquillity", and argued that "[t]o establish that public order is threatened, it appears that some degree of violence or unlawful physical violence must be shown". Using this as a point of reference, she criticized Yong C.J.'s equation of public order with "public peace, welfare or good order".

==== Public health and morality ====
The Singapore courts have not yet interpreted the meaning of the terms public health and morality in Article 15(4).

The UK case of R. (Ghai) v. Newcastle City Council (2009) is therefore interesting for purposes of comparison. The claimant, an orthodox Hindu, applied to his local authority for land to be dedicated for traditional open air funeral pyres. The local authority refused the request, relying on subsidiary legislation that made it an offence to burn human remains other than in a crematorium. The claimant then applied for judicial review, submitting that the decision infringed his right to manifest his religion or belief which was protected by Article 9(1) of the European Convention on Human Rights. The High Court found that the statutory interference with the claimant's right was justified as it was necessary for the protection of public morals and of the rights and freedoms of others. The Court of Appeal reversed the judgement on grounds unrelated to Article 9, holding that open air pyres were permissible on a proper construction of the legislation.

=== Test for determining if restriction of right is appropriate ===
==== Singapore ====
In Chan Hiang Leng Colin v. P.P. (1994), counsel for the appellants argued that there had to be a "clear and immediate danger" to public order before the right of freedom of religion could be restricted, and in this case the restriction was unjustified since there had been no such threat at all. However, Yong C.J. said that attempt to apply the "clear and immediate danger" test was misplaced:

It cannot be said that beliefs, especially those propagated in the name of "religion", should not be put to a stop until such a scenario exists. If not, it would in all probability be too late as the damage sought to be prevented would have transpired.

However, Yong C.J. did not articulate any alternative test for determining if a restriction upon freedom of religion is appropriate. Quoting Malaysian Chief Justice Hashim Yeop Sani's judgement in the case Minister for Home Affairs, Malaysia v. Jamaluddin bin Othman (1989), he agreed that "[t]he freedom to profess and practise one's religion should not be turned into a licence to commit unlawful acts or acts tending to prejudice or threaten the security of the country". Yong C.J. considered that since "the sovereignty, integrity and unity of Singapore are undoubtedly the paramount mandate of the Constitution", religious beliefs and practices which tended to run counter to these objectives had to be restrained.

In the appeal against Prakash J.'s judgement to the Court of Appeal, also called Chan Hiang Leng Colin v. Minister for Information and the Arts (1996), counsel for the appellants argued that the restriction placed by the Minister on the importation, sale and distribution of the Jehovah's Witnesses publications was too wide and disproportionate. Applying an approach similar to that taken in Chan Hiang Leng Colin v. P.P. (1994), the Court of Appeal noted that the appellants were essentially seeking to challenge the view taken by the Minister that Jehovah's Witnesses' refusal to carry out National Service was a threat to national security. The Court regarded this as a non-justiciable issue and declined to allow the appellants to bring an application for judicial review of Order No. 405/1995.

Professor Thio Li-ann has argued that since Article 15(1) is the general statement of principle that guarantees freedom of religion while Article 15(4) is an exception to the general principle, Yong C.J.'s assertion that "actions undertaken or flowing from [religious] beliefs must conform with the general law relating to public order and social protection" is incorrect. In making a case against judicial deference and for judicial balancing of interests, she says:

It is the judicial role to devise constitutional tests like a[n] Object of Act – Art 15(4) nexus test or to ensure that a sufficient relationship exists between the means and end of the Act, with the end conforming to an Art 15(4) ground. Any other interpretation runs the risk of the exception swallowing up the general, which would make a mockery of any constitutional liberty.

In Thio's view, courts should adopt a three-step proportionality approach when interpreting constitutional fundamental liberties. A judge should first "identify the interests behind two competing rights eg the value of religious liberty as a source of private and public virtue as well as being an aspect of free conscience as against the value of having public order and a stable environment. Secondly, these factors are all to be placed on the Libra-like balancing scales of justice so that their merits and demerits can be assessed against each other. ... Thirdly, all things considered, the Judge is to deliver his judgment as to where the balance should lie." In the light of this approach, Yong C.J.'s acceptance of the Minister's view "as conclusive, refusing to question it on the basis of not wanting to transgress the legal/merits dichotomy" resulted in a failure to balance the interest of the appellants against that of the State.

==== Other jurisdictions ====
The situation in Singapore may be contrasted with the application of a proportionality analysis in other jurisdictions vis-à-vis the constitutional protection of freedom of religion. Section 2(a) of the Canadian Charter of Rights and Freedoms states that the freedom of conscience and religion is a fundamental freedom enjoyed by everybody. It is subject to section 1: "The rights and freedoms set out in the Canadian Charter are subject only to such reasonable limits prescribed by law as can be demonstrably justified in a free and democratic society."

In the important decision R. v. Oakes (1986), the Supreme Court of Canada held that a two-part test must be satisfied before a limitation infringing a right can be "saved" by section 1. First, the limitation must have "an objective related to concerns which are pressing and substantial in a free and democratic society"; and, second, it must be shown "that the means chosen are reasonable and demonstrably justified". The second part is described as a "proportionality test" which requires the invoking party to show:

First, the measures adopted must be carefully designed to achieve the objective in question. They must not be arbitrary, unfair or based on irrational considerations. In short, they must be rationally connected to the objective. Second, the means, even if rationally connected to the objective in this first sense, should impair "as little as possible" the right or freedom in question. Third, there must be a proportionality between the effects of the measures which are responsible for limiting the Charter right or freedom, and the objective which has been identified as of "sufficient importance".

In Multani v. Marguerite-Bourgeoys (Commission scolaire) (2006), the issue was whether a ban in a public school on Sikh students carrying kirpans (ceremonial daggers) for religious purposes was justifiable. Justice Louise Charron, who delivered the Court's majority opinion, applied the Oakes test to section 2(a) of the Charter. She held that the school could not discharge its burden of proving that prohibiting the kirpan was a reasonable limit on the student's constitutional freedom of religion.

The UK Human Rights Act 1998 makes Article 9(1) of the European Convention on Human Rights, which protects freedom of religion, enforceable in UK domestic law. Article 9(2) states when the freedom of religion may be restricted: "Freedom to manifest one's religion or beliefs shall be subject only to such limitations as are prescribed by law and are necessary in a democratic society in the interests of public safety, for the protection of public order, health or morals, or for the protection of the rights and freedoms of others." R. (Begum) v. Headteacher and Governors of Denbigh High School (2006) was a House of Lords case involving a female Muslim student who wished to wear a jilbab (a long, coat-like garment) to comply with her understanding of the requirements of her faith, but was disallowed from doing so. Lord Bingham of Cornhill said that under Article 9(2), for a restriction to be justified it must be "prescribed by law and necessary in a democratic society for a permissible purpose, that is, it must be directed to a legitimate purpose and must be proportionate in scope and effect". In the end, a majority of the Law Lords hearing the appeal (including Lord Bingham) held that the appellant's rights had not been interfered with. However, the court held unanimously that even if they had been, there were justifiable grounds for such interference, one of which was the need to protect the rights of other female students at the school who would not wish to be pressured into adopting a more extreme form of Muslim dress.

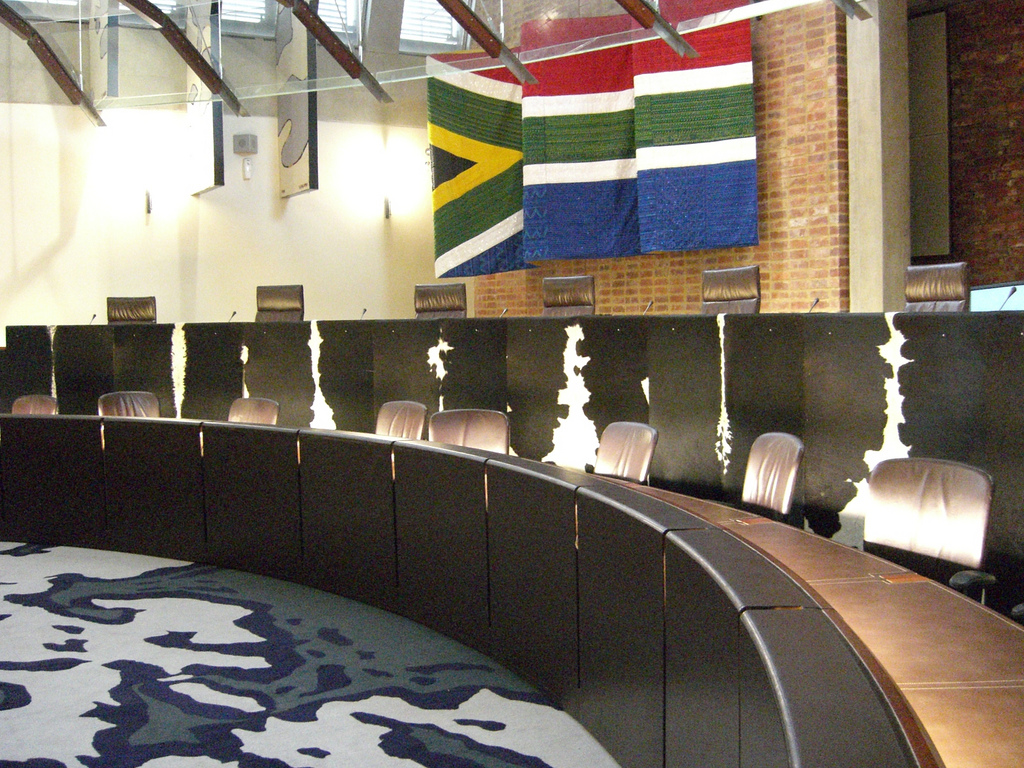
The Constitutional Court of South Africa. In a 2002 case, a majority of the Court applied a proportionality analysis to hold that although a complete ban on use and possession of cannabis infringed the right to freedom of religion of a Rastafari who wished to use the drug for sacramental purposes, the infringement was justifiable as it was proportionate to the State's "war on drugs" policy.

In Prince v. President of the Law Society of the Cape of Good Hope (2002), the appellant challenged, among other things, the constitutionality of the South African Drugs and Drug Trafficking Act 1992 before the Constitutional Court of South Africa. He claimed that his religion – the Rastafari movement – required him to use cannabis and argued that the Act, which prohibited the possession of this drug, infringed his right to freedom of religion protected by section 15 of Chapter 2 of the Constitution of South Africa. Similar to section 1 of the Canadian Charter, section 36(1) of the South African Constitution provides:

The rights in the Bill of Rights may be limited only in terms of law of general application to the extent that the limitation is reasonable and justifiable in an open and democratic society based on human dignity, equality and freedom, taking into account all relevant factors, including

1. the nature of the right;
2. the importance of the purpose of the limitation;
3. and extent of the limitation;
4. the relation between the limitation and its purpose; and
5. less restrictive means to achieve the purpose.

Justice Sandile Ngcobo, writing for the minority, said that "[t]he limitation analysis ... involves the weighing up of competing values and ultimately an assessment based on proportionality", and that in weighing competing interests and evaluating proportionality it was "necessary to examine the relation between the complete ban on the sacramental use or possession of cannabis by the Rastafari and the purpose of the limitation as well as the existence of the less restrictive means to achieve this purpose". Ultimately, though, a majority of the Court held that although the appellant's freedom of religion had been infringed, the infringement was justifiable in that the restriction was proportionate to the "war on drugs" policy of the State – a general exemption for religious purposes would be virtually impossible to police and would interfere materially with the government's ability to enforce its drug control legislation, and other proposed control schemes would be administratively unworkable.

A key distinction between the bills of rights of the Commonwealth jurisdictions referred to above and the Singapore Constitution is that in the latter document, the grounds set out in Article 15(4) for restricting freedom of religion are not expressly subject to any requirement of reasonableness or necessity in a democratic society. One may query whether this is sufficient justification for a Singapore court to decline to apply a proportionality analysis to Article 15(4).

=== Burden of proof ===
An applicant has the burden of proving that a legislative restriction on the freedom of speech has nothing to do with public order, public health or morality. There must be some substance in the applicant's complaint – the Government does not have an immediate duty to justify making a decision that restricts the applicant's right to freedom of speech simply because the applicant complains of an alleged infringement of Article 15(1).

=== Instances of restrictions ===
==== Right of propagation ====
Propagation of religion is not protected when it amounts to an act contrary to any general law relating to public order, public health, or morality under Article 15(4) of the Constitution. In Public Prosecutor v. Koh Song Huat Benjamin (2005), a District Court held that the right to propagate an opinion is not an unfettered right:

The right of one person's freedom of expression must always be balanced by the right of another's freedom from offence, and tempered by wider public interest considerations. It is only appropriate social behaviour, independent of any legal duty, of every Singapore citizen and resident to respect the other races in view of our multi-racial society. Each individual living here irrespective of his racial origin owes it to himself and to the country to see that nothing is said or done which might incite the people and plunge the country into racial strife and violence. These are basic ground rules.

In Public Prosecutor v. Ong Kian Cheong (2009), the District Court said that the above statement, which referred to opinions on race, applied with equal force to insensitive and denigrating opinions about religious beliefs. The case involved two accused persons who were convicted under the Sedition Act and the Undesirable Publications Act for distributing religious literature that was considered seditious and objectionable to Muslims. Section 3(1)(e) of the Sedition Act defines a seditious tendency as including a tendency to "promote feelings of ill-will and hostility between different races or classes of the population of Singapore". In the course of spreading their own faith, the accused persons had offended public order by distributing religious materials that were objectionable to Muslims, and the Court regarded this to be beyond the bounds of the constitutional right to propagate religion. The Court was of the view that although a person is free to choose his or her own religion and to practise it, religious fervour to spread faith must be constrained by considerations of sensitivity, tolerance and mutual respect for the faith and religious beliefs of another. Individuals cannot claim to be ignorant of the sensitivity of race and religion in Singapore's multi-racial and multi-religious society.

Larissis v. Greece (1999) points to other grounds on which the right to propagate one's religion might reasonably be restricted in Singapore. In that case, the European Court of Human Rights accepted that the right to try to persuade another of one's own religious beliefs is included in the "right to manifest [one's] religion or belief" provided for by Article 9(1) of the European Convention on Human Rights. However, this right is not void of limitations. Article 9(2) of the Convention prescribes limitations to the freedom to manifest one's religion "in the interests of public safety, for the protection of public order, health or morals, or for the protection of the rights and freedoms of others". The Court clarified that Article 9(1) does not protect improper proselytism, such as when one offers material or social advantages to entice another to adopt certain religious beliefs, or when one applies improper pressure with a view to gaining new members for a religious group. On the facts of the case, the Court found that Article 9 had not been infringed by the prosecution of three air force officers for proselytizing to their subordinates, since the hierarchical nature of military life meant it was difficult for a subordinate to rebuff the approaches of persons of superior rank. Thus, a conversation which might be regarded as a harmless exchange of ideas in a civilian context could be seen in a military setting as harassment or the imposition of undue pressure in abuse of power.

== Other constitutional provisions ==
In addition to Article 15, there are other provisions in the Constitution that protect religious freedom. Article 12(2) prohibits discrimination against Singapore citizens on the ground of, among others, religion in any law; in the appointment to any office or employment under a public authority; or in the administration of any law relating to the acquisition, holding or disposition of property, or the establishing or carrying on of any trade, business, profession, vocation or employment.

Related to this is Article 16, subsection (1) of which prohibits discrimination against citizens of Singapore on the ground only of, among others, religion in the administration of public educational institutions (and, in particular, as regards the admission of students or the payment of fees), and in providing financial aid from public funds for the maintenance or education of students in any educational institution. The Constitution declares that religious groups have the right to establish and maintain institutions for the education of children and to provide them religious instruction in those institutions, but provides that people cannot be discriminated against on the ground only of religion in laws relating to such institutions or the administration of such laws. Furthermore, no person may be compelled to receive instruction in or take part in any ceremony or act of worship of a religion apart from his or her own.

The Government has a constitutional responsibility "constantly to care for the interests of the racial and religious minorities in Singapore". In particular, the Government must exercise its functions in such a way as to recognize the special position of the Malays, the indigenous people of Singapore. Accordingly, it has the responsibility to "protect, safeguard, support, foster and promote their political, educational, religious, economic, social and cultural interests and the Malay language." The Constitution also requires the Legislature to enact legislation to regulate Muslim religious affairs and to establish a council to advise the President concerning matters relating to Islam. The legislation in question is the Administration of Muslim Law Act.

== See also ==
- Freedom of religion in Singapore
- Maintenance of Religious Harmony Act
