= Stanislaus v. State of Madhya Pradesh =

1977 Supreme Court of India religious conversion case

- Court: Supreme Court of India
- Citation: 1977 SCR (2) 611

Rev Stanislaus vs Madhya Pradesh, 1977 SCR (2) 611, is a matter where the Supreme Court of India considered the issue whether the fundamental right to practise and propagate religion includes the right to convert. The court held that the right to propagate does not include the right to convert and therefore upheld the constitutional validity of the laws enacted by Madhya Pradesh and Odisha legislatures prohibiting conversion by force, fraud or allurement.

== Background ==
Reverend Stanislaus of Raipur challenged the Madhya Pradesh Dharma Swatantrya Act by refusing to register conversions. The Madhya Pradesh High Court upheld the Act by stating that the freedom of religion must be guaranteed to all, even those who are subject to conversions by "force, fraud, or allurement." When the Orissa Freedom of Religion Act was challenged in the Orissa High Court, the decision went in the opposite direction on grounds that the definition of "inducement" was too broad and that only the parliament had the power to enact such legislation and the state legislature did not have the power to legislate on this matter. The Supreme Court of India heard both these cases together and ruled in favour of both the Acts.

== Ruling ==
The Constitution Bench of the Supreme Court had five judges and was headed by Chief Justice A.N. Ray. The Bench interpreted the word `propagate' used in Article 25(1) of the Constitution as `defined' in the Shorter Oxford Dictionary - "to spread from person to person, or from place to place, to disseminate, diffuse (a statement, belief, practice etc.)" and in the Century Dictionary (which is an Encyclopaedic Lexicon of the English Language) Vol. VI - "to transmit or spread from person to person or from place to place; carry forward or onward; diffuse; extend; as `propagate' a report; `propagate' the Christian religion." The Bench observed: "We have no doubt that it is in this sense that the word `propagate' has been used in Article 25(1), for what the Article grants is not the right to convert another person to one's own religion, but to transmit or spread one's religion by an exposition of its tenets."

A distinction was made between the right to propagate and the right to convert. The former was allowed while the latter was seen as not a part of the fundamental rights.

Referring to Article 25(1), Chief Justice Ray, writing for the Court, held: What the Article grants is not the right to convert another person to one's own religion, but to transmit or spread one's religion by an exposition of its tenets. It has to be remembered that Article 25(1) guarantees Afreedom of conscious to every citizen, and not merely to the followers of one particular religion and that, in turn, postulates that there is no fundamental right to convert another person to one's own religion because if a person purposely undertakes the conversion of another person to his religion, as distinguished from his effort to transmit or spread the tenets of his religion, that would impinge on the "freedom of conscience" guaranteed to all the citizens of the country alike.

This distinction between conversion and propagation simply for "the edification of others" was previously stated in Ratilal v. State of Bombay, [FN61] which was appealed to as a precedent.

== Reaction ==
M Rama Jois, former chief justice of the Punjab and Haryana High Court, says, "Organised conversion, whether by force or fraud or by providing help or allurement to persons, taking undue advantage of their poverty and ignorance, is anti-secular. Respect for all religions is the essence of our secularism, whereas religious intolerance constitutes the basis of planned conversion. Therefore, conversion cannot be a secular activity."
