= Freedom of religion in Singapore =

Freedom of religion in Singapore is a guaranteed constitutionally protected right. Article 15 of the Constitution of Singapore states: "Every person has the right to profess and practise his religion and to propagate it." and allows believers the freedom to assemble and worship without limitation or interference.

The Sedition Act also prohibits seditious acts and speech which "promote feelings of ill-will and hostility between different races or classes of the population of Singapore," and the Maintenance of Religious Harmony Act (MRHA) empowers the Minister for Home Affairs to take a pre-emptive approach by issuing restraining orders against a religious leader that has committed or is attempting to commit certain acts threatening religious harmony.

Some movements deemed controversial have been de-registered, but not banned, by the government, most notably the Jehovah's Witnesses (JW) in 1972 because of their opposition to military service which is obligatory for all male citizens. A decade later, it dissolved the Unification Church (UC) – colloquially known as "Moonies" – as it was deemed a cult that was breaking up families. Nevertheless, followers of such denominations are able to practice their own beliefs without much interference, with proselytising being restricted.

== Religious demography ==
External videos
- Lee Kuan Yew on religious tolerance and aggressive proselytisation in 1990, Youtube video

Singapore has an area of 330 square miles (850 km^{2}) and a total population of 6.04 million (as of June 2024), of whom 3.8 million are citizens or permanent residents.

In Singapore, 26% of adults identify as Buddhist, 18% as Muslim, 17% as Christian, 8% as Hindu, 6% as adherents of Chinese traditional religions such as Taoism or Confucianism, and 4% follow other religions, including Indigenous faiths. Additionally, 22% of adults do not identify with any religion.

The 2024 census states that 75.6% of the resident population is ethnic Chinese, 15.1% ethnic Malay and 7.6% are ethnic Indian; nearly all ethnic Malays are Muslim, while 57.3% ethnic Indians are Hindu and the ethnic Chinese population are 40% Buddhists and 21% Christian.

== Legal and policy framework ==
"All groups have to exercise tolerance and restraint. Christians cannot expect this to be a Christian society, Muslims cannot expect this to be a Muslim society, ditto with the Buddhists, the Hindus and the other groups. Many faiths share this island. Each has different teachings, different practices. Rules which only apply to one group cannot become laws which are enforced on everyone. Muslims do not drink alcohol but alcohol is not banned. Ditto gambling which many religions disapprove of but gambling is not banned. If we have to live together in peace, then all have to adopt ‘live and let live’ as our principle."

— Lee Hsien Loong, National Day Rally speech, 2009.

The Constitution of Singapore provides for freedom of religion as a guaranteed right under Article 15 which states: "Every person has the right to profess and practise his religion and to propagate it."

While there is no state religion in Singapore, the government plays an active but limited role in religious affairs. For example, it seeks to ensure that citizens, most of whom live in government-built housing, have ready access to religious organizations traditionally associated with their ethnic groups by helping such institutions find space in these housing complexes. The government also maintains a semiofficial relationship with the Muslim community through the Islamic Religious Council of Singapore (MUIS). The MUIS advises the government on concerns of the Muslim community, drafts the approved weekly sermon, regulates some Muslim religious matters, and oversees a mosque-building fund financed by voluntary payroll deductions. The Constitution acknowledges Malay/Muslims to be "the indigenous people of Singapore" and charges the Government specifically to protect, safeguard, support, foster and promote their political, educational, religious, economic, social, cultural, and language interests.

The 1961 Women's Charter gives women, among other rights, the right to own property, conduct trade, and receive divorce settlements. Muslim women enjoy most of the rights and protections of the Women's Charter; however, for the most part, Muslim marriage law falls under the administration of the 1966 Administration of Muslim Law Act, which empowers the Shari'a court to oversee such matters. The act also allows Muslim men to practice polygamy. Requests to take additional wives may be refused by the Registry of Muslim Marriages, which solicits the views of existing wives and reviews the financial capability of the husband. As of 2007, there were 44 applications for polygamous marriage and 13 applications were approved.

The Presidential Council for Minority Rights examines all pending bills to ensure that they do not disadvantage a particular group. It also reports to the Government on matters affecting any racial or religious community and investigates complaints. There were no complaints or reports to the Presidential Council on Minority Rights from the fiscal year 2005/2006.

There are official holy days for each major religion in the country: Hari Raya Haji and Hari Raya Puasa for Muslims, Christmas and Good Friday for Christians, Deepavali for Hindus, and Vesak Day for Buddhists.

The government fosters interfaith understanding indirectly by supporting activities aimed at promoting interethnic harmony. Since the major ethnic minorities are largely associated with a single faith, government initiatives to encourage ethnic harmony also have an impact on interfaith relations. In February 2006, Prime Minister Lee Hsien Loong unveiled the Community Engagement Programme (CEP). The goal of the CEP is to promote multiracial and interreligious harmony, in part so that a strong foundation would be in place should an incident that could provoke ethnic/religious discord, such as a religiously related terrorist attack, occur in the country. The CEP has held numerous community-based seminars, worked with trade unions to form cluster working groups on religious and community harmony, and launched a new website as a platform for communication and dialogue.

The Compulsory Education Act of 2000 mandates attendance at public schools for all children, with few exceptions. In response to concern from the Malay/Muslim community regarding the fate of madrassahs, the government decided to allow Muslim students to attend school at a madrassah in lieu of a public school. As of 2021, there are six full-time madrasahs with approximately 3,600 students and 280 religious teachers in total.

The Sedition Act prohibits seditious acts and speech which "promote feelings of ill-will and hostility between different races or classes of the population of Singapore." The maximum penalty for a first offender is a fine of up to S$5,000 or imprisonment not exceeding three years or both, and for a subsequent offender imprisonment not exceeding five years.

A statutory counterpart to the Sedition Act is section 298A of the Penal Code, which was introduced in 2007 to "criminalise the deliberate promotion by someone of enmity, hatred or ill-will between different racial and religious groups on grounds of race or religion."

The Maintenance of Religious Harmony Act empowers the Minister for Home Affairs to take a pre-emptive approach by issuing restraining orders against a religious leader that has committed or is attempting to commit certain acts threatening religious harmony.

The overlapping array of the above legislative arrangements is designed to leave the choice of a suitable response to prosecutorial discretion when faced with potential mischiefs of a religious nature.

== Restrictions on new religious movements (NRMs) ==
=== Deregistration of Jehovah's Witnesses ===
In 1972, the government revoked the registration of the Singapore Congregation of Jehovah's Witnesses, stating that its presence posed a risk to public welfare and order. This was due to the group's refusal to perform mandatory military service (required of all male citizens), salute the flag, or take oaths of allegiance to the state. While the Court of Appeals in 1996 affirmed the rights of Jehovah's Witnesses members to profess, practice, and share their religious beliefs, and the Government does not arrest individuals merely for being adherents, the deregistration has effectively rendered public meetings of Jehovah's Witnesses unlawful. Nevertheless, since the 1996 ruling, no charges have been brought against persons attending or holding Jehovah's Witness meetings in private homes.

The government can also influence religious practice through the Maintenance of Religious Harmony Act. The act was passed in 1990 and revised in 2001 in response to actions that the Government viewed as threats to religious harmony. This includes aggressive and "insensitive" proselytizing and "the mixing of religion and politics." The act established the Presidential Council on Religious Harmony, which reports to the Minister for Home Affairs and is empowered to issue restraining orders against leaders and members of religious groups to prevent them from carrying out political activities, "exciting disaffection against" the Government, creating "ill will" between religious groups, or carrying out subversive activities. These orders place individuals on notice that they should not repeat such acts; contravening a restraining order can result in fines of up to $6,622 (SGD 10,000) and up to two years' imprisonment for a first offense. The act also prohibits judicial review of its enforcement or of any possible denial of rights arising from it.

Missionaries, with the exception of members of Jehovah's Witnesses and representatives of the Unification Church, are permitted to work and to publish and distribute religious texts. However, while the Government does not prohibit evangelical activities, in practice it discourages activities that might upset the balance of intercommunal relations. As of 2007, authorities did not detain any Jehovah's Witnesses for proselytizing.

The government has banned all written materials published by the Watchtower Bible and Tract Society and other corporations of Jehovah's Witnesses. In practice, this has led to confiscation of Bibles published by the groups, although the Bible itself has not been outlawed. A person in possession of banned literature can be fined up to SGD 5,000 (USD 1,500) and jailed up to 12 months for a first conviction.

There were reports in the early 2000s of Jehovah's Witnesses students being suspended from school for refusing to sing the national anthem or participate in the flag ceremony.

There were 23 members of Jehovah's Witnesses incarcerated in the armed forces detention barracks because they refused to carry out the legal obligation for all male citizens to serve in the armed, police, or civil defence forces. The initial sentence for failure to comply with the military service requirement is 15 months' imprisonment, to which 24 months are added upon a second refusal. Failure to perform annual military reserve duty, which is required of all those who have completed their initial two-year obligation, results in 40-day sentences; a 12-month sentence is usual after four such refusals. All of the Jehovah's Witnesses in detention were incarcerated for failing to perform their initial military obligations and expect to serve a total of 39 months. As of December 2023, there are 17 Jehovah's witnesses in prison.

=== Ban on International Society for Krishna Consciousness ===
Although ISKCON is currently active in Singapore, the country initially banned the International Society for Krishna Consciousness in the 1970s. Foreign ISKCON monks as well as Srila Prabhupada, founder of the Hare Krishna movement, were barred from entering Singapore, and all attempts by followers to officially register the society failed. Nevertheless, by avoiding affiliation with ISKCON, Hare Krishna followers have subsequently succeeded in registering their societies under different names. These include the Sri Krishna Mandir in Geylang and the Gita Reading Society at the Gauranga Centre in Serangoon.

ISKCON activities are now permitted in Singapore, and the movement operates within the legal framework, conducting devotional programs and festivals while adhering to the guidelines established by the government. This includes avoiding overt public proselytization and maintaining a focus on community-based worship and cultural events. ISKCON Singapore has a vibrant community and holds regular events, as seen in its calendar of activities and celebrations.

According to Mr. Rodney Sebastian, a researcher in the Department of Religion at the University of Florida who has spent about five years studying the Hare Krishna community, there are about 3,000 Hare Krishna devotees in Singapore.

=== Dissolution of the Unification Church ===
In 1982 the Minister for Home Affairs dissolved the Holy Spirit Association for the Unification of World Christianity, also known as the Unification Church (and colloquially as "Moonies"), for reportedly breaking up families.

=== Dissolution of the Christian Conference of Asia ===
In January 1987, Singapore shut down the office of the Christian Conference of Asia (CCA), a regional ecumenical fellowship of churches and denominational councils across the Asia Pacific, for allegedly interfering in its local politics. The Ministry of Home Affairs accused the CCA of backing liberation movements and financing pro-communist movements in other countries, and giving financial support to Vincent Cheng Kim Chuan, a full-time Catholic Church worker, one of 22 people detained under the Internal Security Act, allowing detention without trial, for taking part in an alleged "Marxist Conspiracy" to overthrow the government. Singapore Special Branch officers entered the office, informing staff members of the dissolution and telling them to clear out. CCA general secretary Reverend Kenichi Otsu of Japan, Park Sang-jung of South Korea, Pura Calo of the Philippines and Nelun Gunasekara of Sri Lanka were expelled from Singapore and ordered to leave with their families. "The Singapore government does not presume to judge the rights and wrongs of liberation theology movements in other countries," said the ministry in a statement. "But by promoting political causes in the region and supporting radical activists in Singapore, the CCA has clearly breached its undertaking not to engage in political activities."

=== City Harvest Church criminal breach of trust case ===
In October 2015, following a years-long trial, City Harvest Church founder Kong Hee and five other church officials were found guilty of the misappropriation of S$50 million in church funds, S$24 million of which were used to invest in sham bonds to bankroll the pop music career of his wife, Ho Yeow Sun. The case was the biggest criminal breach of trust case in the history of Singapore. While defendants argued that their actions were meant to further a religious cause, namely evangelism through Ho's entry into the world of pop music, the trial ended with all six convicted, jailed and permanently barred from having overall administrative control of any charity.

=== Probe into Shincheonji ===
In February 2020, Singapore began a probe into the unregistered local chapter of the South Korean new religious movement Shincheonji Church of Jesus. The apocalyptic, messianic sect was known for being the centre and cause of the first large-scale COVID-19 outbreak in South Korea. The group had fewer than 100 members in Singapore and operated covertly through a front company called Spasie Enrichment. The Ministry of Home Affairs said the group had earlier tried, and failed, to register a company under the name of Heavenly Culture, World Peace and Restoration of Light.

In November 2020, 21 members of the group were arrested for belonging to an illegal society. Five South Korean nationals in key roles were deported to South Korea, and the group's front organizations were dismantled.

== Notable incidents ==
=== Comments on Buddhism and Taoism by Pastor Rony Tan ===
In February 2010, online videos posted on the website of Lighthouse Evangelism of sermons by then-senior pastor Rony Tan who suggested that Buddhism and Taoism were Satanic that caused a public uproar in Singapore, prompting a visit by the government's Internal Security Department. Tan swiftly pulled the videos off the website, and met with Buddhist and Taoist leaders to offer a personal apology.

Returning to the pulpit that weekend, Tan said the church was "in the process of eliminating all possible offensive recorded material" and urged church members "not to circulate our past sermons which may provoke religious sensitivity".

=== Expulsion of Indian Imam ===
In April 2017, Nalla Mohamed Abdul Jameel, the chief imam at Jamae Chulia Mosque for over seven years, was fined S$4,000 and repatriated to India after pleading guilty to "promoting enmity between different groups on the grounds of religion", and committing an "act prejudicial to the maintenance of harmony". In a video circulated online, the imam recited a prayer in Arabic that said “God help us against Jews and Christians”, among other things, was circulated online. He later apologised to Jewish and Christian leaders in closed-door meetings, saying that the additional supplication he read was not from the Quran, but an old Arabic text originating from his village in India.

A statement by the Ministry of Home Affairs said the action was "taken with some regret". It described the imam as having worked diligently "attending to the needs of his congregation, and reaching out to other faiths" and was "not deliberately malicious.”

Two Muslim Singaporeans received stern warnings related to the incident. One individual was cautioned for sharing the video on Facebook instead of reporting it to the police. The other, a Malay studies associate professor at the National University of Singapore, faced a warning for a Facebook post that was interpreted as expressing support for the imam.

=== Two foreign Christian preachers denied entry ===
In September 2017, the Ministry of Home Affairs said two foreign Christian preachers had been denied short term work passes to speak in the country. The ministry did not name the preachers but said they had made "denigrating and inflammatory comments of other religions" in the past. One of them was identified by The Straits Times as American preacher Dutch Sheets who had allegedly described Allah as "a false god", and called for prayers for those "held captive in the darkness of Islam". He also referred to Buddhists as "Tohuw", a Hebrew word meaning "lost, lifeless, confused and spiritually barren".

The other unnamed preacher referred to "the evils of Islam" and "the malevolent nature of Islam and Muhammad". He called Islam "not a religion of peace", "an incredibly confused religion", interested in "world domination" and "a religion based on... adhering to uncompromising and cruel laws often focused on warfare and virtual slavery".

Home affairs and law minister K Shanmugam was quoted in local press reports as saying, "Just as I have banned Muslim scholars or preachers from coming into Singapore, the most recent banning has been (for) Christian preachers. They were very Islamophobic in their statements outside of Singapore, and we decided we will ban them."

=== Bans on Mufti Menk and Ustaz Haslin Baharim ===
In October 2017, Singapore banned Salafi preacher Mufti Menk, the Grand Mufti of Zimbabwe, and Ustaz Haslin Baharim of Malaysia, from entering Singapore. The Ministry of Home Affairs said the pair had previously had their Miscellaneous Work Pass applications to preach in the country rejected, and would not be allowed to get around the ban by preaching on religious-themed cruises operating from Singapore.

Mufti Menk had previously described LGBT people as being "worse than animals", and put forward the view that wishing non-Muslims "Merry Christmas" or "Happy Deepavali" was "the highest form of blasphemy". Haslin Baharim had previously described non-Muslims as "deviant".

Johor's Sultan Ibrahim Ismail in neighbouring Malaysia followed suit by issuing a decree to ban the pair from the state.

=== Controversy over remarks by American preacher Lou Engle ===
In March 2018, remarks by fundamentalist American preacher Lou Engle that were made at a three-day conference organised by Cornerstone Community Church created an uproar. Engle had addressed thousands attending the conference, saying, “The Muslims are taking over the south of Spain. But I had a dream, where I will raise up the church all over Spain to push back a new modern Muslim movement.”

Cornerstone Community Church filed a police report against Rice Media, an online news startup that first reported the remarks. The church said the article was a "scurrilous attack" and that it had a “seditious tendency”. It also said the article contained serious allegations "that seek to, and has the effect of, stirring up religious tensions and promoting feelings of ill-will and hostility between Christians and Muslims".

Yang Tuck Yoong, senior pastor of the church, later said Engle's remarks were "never meant to be an indictment against Muslims or the Muslim community in Spain as a whole. Instead, he was referring to the radical Islamic insurgency, including ISIS (Islamic State in Iraq and Syria) advances into that nation with intentions of pressing its brand of militant ideology. He expressed his apologies that the choice of words used might have caused unnecessary misunderstandings, as it had not been in his intention to do so." Engle did not comply with a request by the police department to return to Singapore to cooperate with investigations. Yang later met with the Mufti of Singapore and other Muslim community leaders to offer an apology. He said the church was unaware of Engle's controversial past and informed him that he would not be able to speak in Singapore in future.

At an interfaith visit with a mosque months later, Yang said the church had tightened protocols and procedures to ensure "something like this never happens again".

== See also ==
- Article 15 of the Constitution of Singapore
- Human rights in Singapore
- Religion in Singapore
