= Constitution of Singapore =

Supreme law of Singapore

Constitution of the Republic of Singapore
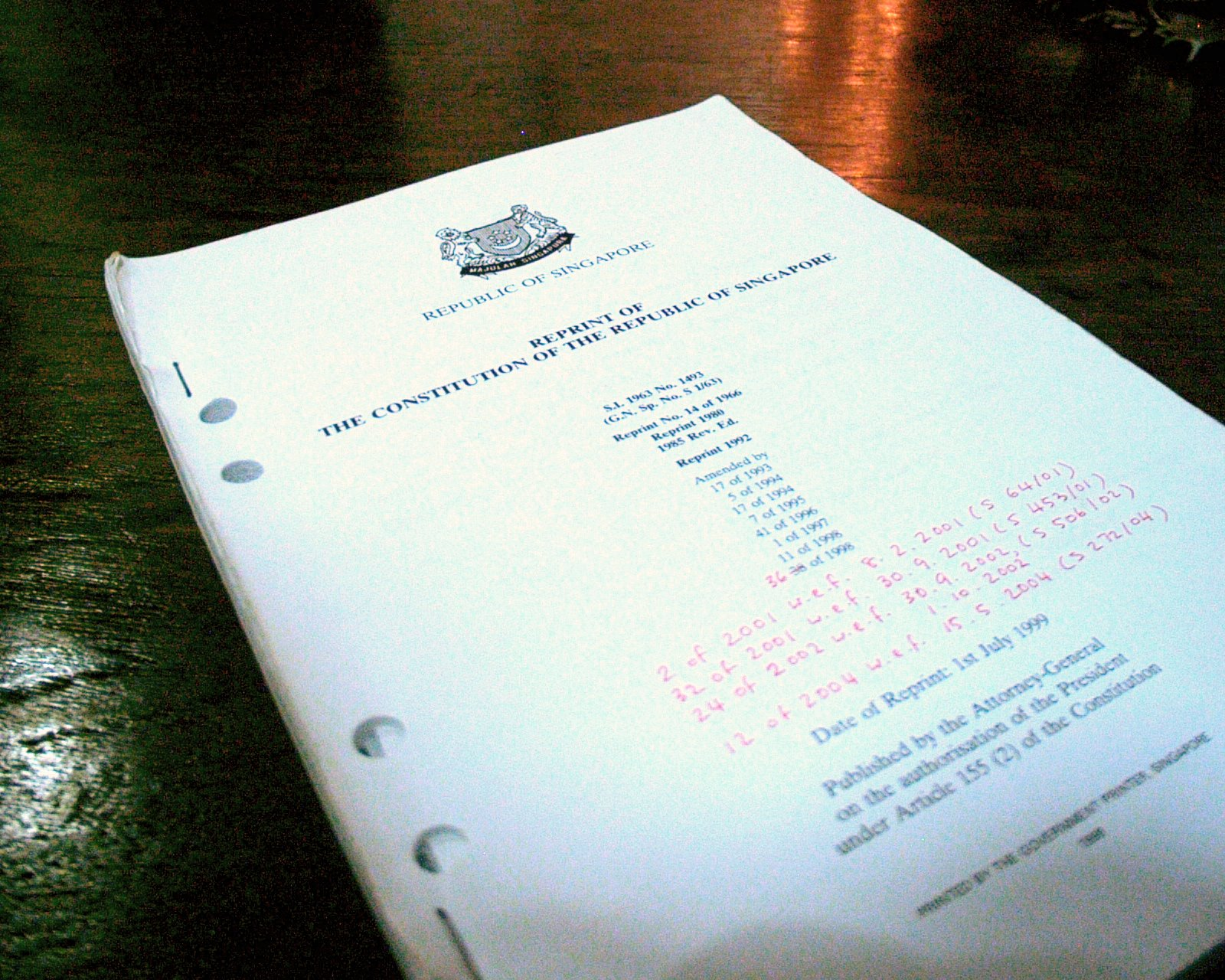
- The 1999 Reprint of the Constitution

Overview
- Jurisdiction: Singapore
- Ratified: 22 December 1965
- Date effective: 9 August 1965 (ex post facto)
- System: parliamentary representative democratic republic

Government structure
- Branches: 3
- Chambers: Unicameral
- Executive: Prime Minister
- Judiciary: Supreme, State, Family Justice
- Federalism: No
- Last amended: 2025
- Citation: 1985 Rev. Ed., 1999 Rep.
- Supersedes: Constitution of the State of Singapore 1963, Federal Constitution of Malaysia, Republic of Singapore Independence Act 1965 (No. 9 of 1965, 1985 Rev. Ed.)

Full text
- Constitution of the Republic of Singapore at Wikisource

Constitution of the Republic of Singapore

Chinese name
- Traditional Chinese: 新加坡共和國憲法
- Simplified Chinese: 新加坡共和国宪法
Transcriptions
Standard Mandarin
- Hanyu Pinyin: Xīnjiāpō Gònghéguó Xiànfǎ

Malay name
- Malay: Perlembagaan Republik Singapura

Tamil name
- Tamil: சிங்கப்பூர் குடியரசின் அரசியல் சாசனம், Ciṅkappūr Kuṭiyaraciṉ Araciyal Cācaṉam

The Constitution of the Republic of Singapore is the supreme law of Singapore. A written constitution, the text which took effect on 9 August 1965, is derived from the Constitution of the State of Singapore 1963, provisions of the Federal Constitution of Malaysia made applicable to Singapore by the Republic of Singapore Independence Act 1965 (No. 9 of 1965, 1985 Rev. Ed.), and the Republic of Singapore Independence Act itself. The text of the Constitution is one of the legally binding sources of constitutional law in Singapore, the others being judicial interpretations of the Constitution, and certain other statutes. Non-binding sources are influences on constitutional law such as soft law, constitutional conventions, and public international law.

In the exercise of its original jurisdiction – that is, its power to hear cases for the first time – the High Court carries out two types of judicial review: judicial review of legislation, and judicial review of administrative acts. Although in a 1980 case the Privy Council held that the fundamental liberties in Part IV of the Constitution should be interpreted generously, Singapore courts usually adopt a philosophy of deference to Parliament and a strong presumption of constitutional validity, which has led to fundamental liberties being construed narrowly in certain cases. The courts also generally adopt a purposive approach, favouring interpretations that promote the purpose or object underlying constitutional provisions.

Article 4 of the Constitution expressly declares that it is the supreme law of the land. The Constitution also appears to satisfy Albert Venn Dicey's three criteria for supremacy: codification, rigidity, and the existence of judicial review by the courts. However, the view has been taken that it may not be supreme in practice and that Singapore's legal system is de facto characterised by parliamentary sovereignty.

There are two ways to amend the Constitution, depending on the nature of the provision being amended. Most of the Constitution's Articles can be amended with the support of more than two-thirds of all the Members of Parliament during the Second and Third Readings of each constitutional amendment bill. However, provisions protecting Singapore's sovereignty can only be amended if supported at a national referendum by at least two-thirds of the total number of votes cast. This requirement also applies to Articles 5(2A) and 5A, though these provisions are not yet operational. Article 5(2A) protects certain core constitutional provisions such as the fundamental liberties in Part IV of the Constitution, and Articles relating to the President's election, powers, maintenance, immunity from suit, and removal from office; while Article 5A enables the President to veto proposed constitutional amendments that directly or indirectly circumvent or curtail his discretionary powers. These provisions are not yet in force as the Government views the Elected Presidency as an evolving institution in need of further refinements.

The Malaysian courts have distinguished between the exercise of "constituent power" and "legislative power" by Parliament. When Parliament amends the Constitution by exercising constituent power, the amendment Act cannot be challenged as inconsistent with the Constitution's existing provisions. The Singapore position is unclear since this issue has not been raised before the courts. However, it is arguable that they are likely to apply the Malaysian position as the relevant provisions of the Constitution of Malaysia and the Singapore Constitution are in pari materia with each other. In addition, the High Court has rejected the basic structure or basic features doctrine developed by the Supreme Court of India, which means that Parliament is not precluded from amending or repealing any provisions of the Constitution, even those considered as basic.

== Sources of and influences upon constitutional law ==
Constitutionalism has been described as being "concerned with curbing oppressive government and preserving individual freedom while retaining a realm for the exercise of legitimate governmental power". A constitution can therefore be described as "[t]he fundamental and organic law of a nation or state, establishing the conception, character, and organization of its government, as well as prescribing the extent of its sovereign power and the manner of its exercise", or a specific statute containing provisions that serve those purposes. In this article, the term constitution (with a lowercase c) refers to the body of legal rules having constitutional effect in Singapore, while Constitution (with an uppercase C) refers to the main statute containing constitutional rules.

In Singapore, the sources of constitutional law may be grouped into two categories: those that are legally binding and those that are not. Legally binding sources include the text of the Constitution, judicial interpretations of the Constitution, and other statutes. Non-binding sources are influences on constitutional law such as soft law, constitutional conventions, and public international law.

=== Legally binding sources ===
==== Text of the Constitution ====
Singapore has a written constitution. The text of the Singapore Constitution which took effect from 9 August 1965 was a patchwork of provisions drawn from three statutes: the Constitution of the State of Singapore 1963, the Federal Constitution of Malaysia made applicable to Singapore by the Republic of Singapore Independence Act 1965, and the Republic of Singapore Independence Act itself. These provided the newly independent nation with a working constitution at short notice.

===== Constitution of the State of Singapore 1963 and its predecessors =====
Since Singapore was founded as a factory or trading post of the East India Company in 1819, a number of laws having constitutional status have applied to it. Singapore became part of the Straits Settlements in 1867, which were granted a colonial constitution by way of letters patent dated 4 February 1867 that established the Legislative Council of the Straits Settlements. Further letters patent dated 17 November 1877 set up an executive council and authorised the Governor to appoint judges. Thereafter, a number of other legal instruments were issued to streamline the constitutional structure of the colony, but did not make significant changes to the arrangements put in place by the 1867 and 1877 letters patent. The last constitution of the Straits Settlements was based on letters patent dated 17 December 1911 as amended by letters patent and royal instructions both dated 18 August 1924.

After the Japanese Occupation, the Straits Settlements were dissolved in 1946 and Singapore became a Crown colony. Its new constitution, the Singapore Order in Council 1946, established an executive council and a legislative council which, for the first time, had a number of elected members. The constitution came into effect on 1 March 1948, and the first legislative elections in Singapore were held on 20 March that year. In 1953, a constitutional commission headed by Sir George Rendel was set up to recommend further changes in the constitutional system, with the aim of increasing widespread participation in the central and local government of Singapore. The British Government accepted most of the Rendel Commission's recommendations in its report of February 1954 and implemented them by way of the Singapore Colony Order in Council 1955, commonly known as the Rendel Constitution. While the new Legislative Assembly was a largely elected body, the colonial administration retained authority over administration, finance, internal security and law.

In 1955, a dispute over the Rendel Constitution between chief minister David Marshall and governor Robin Black led to a constitutional crisis and Marshall threatening resignation. The constitution was later edited by colonial authorities to favour the elected ministers. The next stage in Singapore's constitutional development was its transformation from a colony to a self-governing state of the British Empire. This was effected by the Singapore (Constitution) Order in Council 1958, which created the position of the Yang di-Pertuan Negara as the head of state, a prime minister and a wholly elected Legislative Assembly with 51 members. Subsequently, pursuant to the Malaysia Agreement of 1963, Singapore merged with the Federation of Malaysia, becoming one of its states and losing colonial status. Singapore was granted a new state constitution in the form of the Constitution of the State of Singapore 1963.

The provisions relating to the legislative and executive bodies of government remained much the same as those in the 1958 Order in Council. On the other hand, the judiciary was regarded as a federal matter and did not form a part of the State Constitution. At this time, there was no bill of rights in the 1963 State Constitution, as the fundamental liberties in Part II of the Federal Constitution applied to Singapore.

===== Federal Constitution of Malaysia =====
Certain provisions of the Constitution of Singapore are derived from the Malaysian Federal Constitution. This was effected through section 6(1) of the Republic of Singapore Independence Act 1965, which states that the provisions of the Constitution of Malaysia, other than those set out in section 6(3) of the Act, "shall continue in force in Singapore, subject to such modifications, adaptations and qualifications and exceptions as may be necessary to bring them into conformity with the independent status of Singapore upon separation from Malaysia". Notably, the fundamental liberties in Part II of the Federal Constitution were made applicable to Singapore. However, Article 13 of the Federal Constitution which concerns the right to property, was specifically omitted to ensure the constitutionality of the Land Acquisition Act 1966 which authorises the Government to compulsorily acquire real estate.

===== Republic of Singapore Independence Act =====
The Republic of Singapore Independence Act 1965 (RSIA) was passed by Parliament on 22 December 1965, and made retrospective to 9 August 1965. Apart from making the fundamental liberties in the Malaysian Federal Constitution applicable in Singapore, the RSIA also received the legislative and executive powers over Singapore, which were relinquished by Malaysia through its Constitution and Malaysia (Singapore Amendment) Act 1965. The executive authority of Singapore was vested in the President and made exercisable by him or by the Cabinet, while the legislative powers of the Yang di-Pertuan Agong (Head of State of Malaysia) and the Parliament of Malaysia in respect of Singapore were vested in the President and the Parliament of Singapore. Furthermore, the RSIA empowered the President to "make such modifications in any written law as appear to him to be necessary or expedient in consequence of the enactment of this Act and in consequence of the independence of Singapore upon separation from Malaysia". This power lasted from 1965 to 1968.

The Constitution (Amendment) Act 1965, which was enacted on the same day as the RSIA and also came into force on 9 August 1965, made the 1963 State Constitution amendable by a simple majority – that is, more than 50% – of all the Members of Parliament on the second and third readings of a constitutional amendment bill. The requirement of a two-thirds majority for amendment was only restored in 1979. The justification for the reversion given by the Minister for Law, E.W. Barker, was that "[a]ll consequential amendments that have been necessitated by our constitutional advancement have now been enacted".

However, these amendments were made to the 1963 State Constitution; the amendment Acts were silent on whether they applied to the RSIA. Thus, although Parliament has made no attempt to amend the RSIA since 1965, it can theoretically be changed or even repealed by a simple majority in Parliament. One problem this raises is even though the RSIA is categorised by the Government as a "constitutional document", legally speaking it is apparently not part of the consolidated Constitution. Constitutional scholar Dr. Kevin Tan has suggested it should be recognised as a sui generis Act having a unique status. It may be that the RSIA's status is similar to that of the New Zealand Bill of Rights Act 1990, which is also an ordinary Act of Parliament. It has been said that while it is theoretically possible to amend or repeal the Bill of Rights Act by a simple majority of the New Zealand Parliament, "any government intent on repeal or restrictive amendment of the Bill of Rights is likely to suffer extreme political difficulty and opprobrium".

In order to safeguard minority interests in a newly independent Singapore and contain the communist threat of the time, a constitutional commission chaired by Chief Justice Wee Chong Jin was convened in 1966 to review the 1963 State Constitution. In its report, the Wee Commission made recommendations regarding two broad areas – political philosophy and principles, and various governmental institutions. Many, but not all, of the recommendations were adopted by Parliament.

===== Reprints of the Constitution =====
In 1980, provisions from the three documents referred to above were consolidated into a single reprint for the first time. Containing 162 Articles and three schedules, this reprint was published in the Government Gazette of 31 March 1980. Prior to the issuance of the 1980 Reprint, the Constitution had been criticised for being inaccessible due to its fragmented nature. The former Chief Minister of Singapore, David Marshall, commented that Singapore had "the untidiest and most confusing constitution that any country has started life with", while constitutional scholar R.H. Hickling acknowledged that "the problem of the layman is ... to ascertain what a Constitution says".

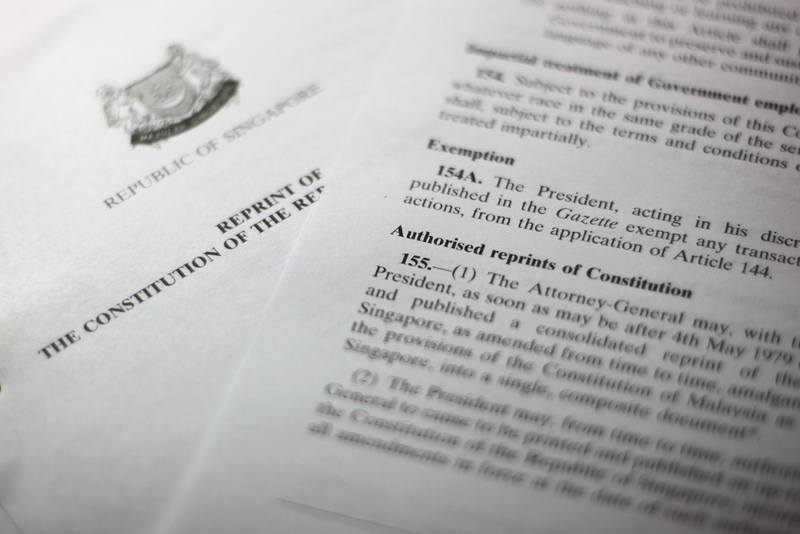
Article 155 of the 1999 Reprint of the Constitution, which empowers the Attorney-General to issue authorised reprints of the Constitution

In 1979, Parliament amended the 1963 State Constitution to give authority to the Attorney-General of Singapore to "cause to be printed and published a consolidated reprint of the Constitution of Singapore, as amended from time to time, amalgamated with such of the provisions of the Constitution of Malaysia as are applicable to Singapore, into a single, composite document". To achieve this task, the Attorney-General was given discretion to merge the existing provisions of the two Constitutions and make modifications that might be necessary or expedient due to Singapore's independent status; to rearrange the provisions; and to omit duplicated, inappropriate or inapplicable ones, among other things. Pursuant to this, the 1980 Reprint of the Constitution was issued. In addition, the President was empowered to authorise the Attorney-General to publish further reprints incorporating all constitutional amendments in force at the date of the authorisation.

While some commentators have noted that the 1980 Reprint created theoretical issues, to date no practical problems have arisen in the application of the Constitution. In Heng Kai Kok v. Attorney-General (1986), a claim for wrongful dismissal by a police sergeant, one issue arising was whether a constitutional provision introduced in 1970 had impliedly repealed an existing provision. Judicial Commissioner Chan Sek Keong decided the case on other grounds, but observed on an obiter basis that this argument was no longer relevant because only the 1970 provision appeared in the 1980 Reprint of the Constitution, and Article 155(3) of the Reprint states that "[a]ny reprint of the Constitution ... shall be deemed to be and shall be, without any question whatsoever in all courts of justice and for all purposes whatsoever, the authentic text of the Constitution of the Republic of Singapore in force as from the date specified in that reprint until superseded by the next or subsequent reprint".

A revised edition of the Constitution was published as part of the 1985 Revised Edition of The Statutes of the Republic of Singapore. The current reprint of the Constitution that is in force is the 1999 Reprint of the 1985 Revised Edition.

==== Judicial interpretation of the Constitution ====
Another source of legally binding constitutional law consists of the body of case law decided by the courts interpreting the Constitution, and laying down fundamental constitutional principles which are not expressly mentioned in the Constitution.

===== Interpretation of the Constitution =====
In the exercise of its original jurisdiction – that is, its power to hear cases for the first time – the High Court carries out two types of judicial review: judicial review of legislation, and judicial review of administrative acts. Regarding the former, Article 4 of the Constitution states: "This Constitution is the supreme law of the Republic of Singapore and any law enacted by the Legislature after the commencement of this Constitution which is inconsistent with this Constitution shall, to the extent of the inconsistency, be void." In Tan Eng Hong v. Attorney-General (2012), the Court of Appeal held that although the Article only refers to laws enacted after the Constitution's commencement on 9 August 1965, laws which pre-date the Constitution can also be invalidated by the court. In addition, Article 162 provides that ordinary laws that were in force prior to the Constitution coming into force on 9 August 1965 continue to apply after the Constitution's commencement but must be construed with such modifications, adaptations, qualifications and exceptions as may be necessary to bring them into conformity with the Constitution. Thus, the Constitution reflects the principle established in the landmark decision of the Supreme Court of the United States, Marbury v. Madison (1803): since it is the role of the courts to interpret the law, they have power to decide whether ordinary laws are inconsistent with the Constitution and, if so, to declare such laws to be void. In the 1994 case Chan Hiang Leng Colin v. Public Prosecutor the High Court adopted a similar stance, and also affirmed that declaring void administrative actions and decisions that infringe the Constitution is part of its responsibility:

The court has the power and duty to ensure that the provisions of the Constitution are observed. The court also has a duty to declare invalid any exercise of power, legislative and executive, which exceeds the limits of the power conferred by the Constitution, or which contravenes any prohibition which the Constitution provides. (Note: The High Court cited the following paper by the former Chief Justice of Australia: Harry Gibbs (1988), "The Court as Guardian of the Constitution: The Basic Principle", in Mohamed Salleh Abas; Visu Sinnadurai (eds.), Law, Justice and the Judiciary: Transnational Trends, Kuala Lumpur: Professional Law Book Publishers, pp. 51–66, ISBN 978-967995804-1. This passage was also mentioned in Taw Cheng Kong v. Public Prosecutor [1998] 1 S.L.R.(R.) 78 at 88–89, para. 14, H.C. (Singapore) ("Taw Cheng Kong (H.C.)").)

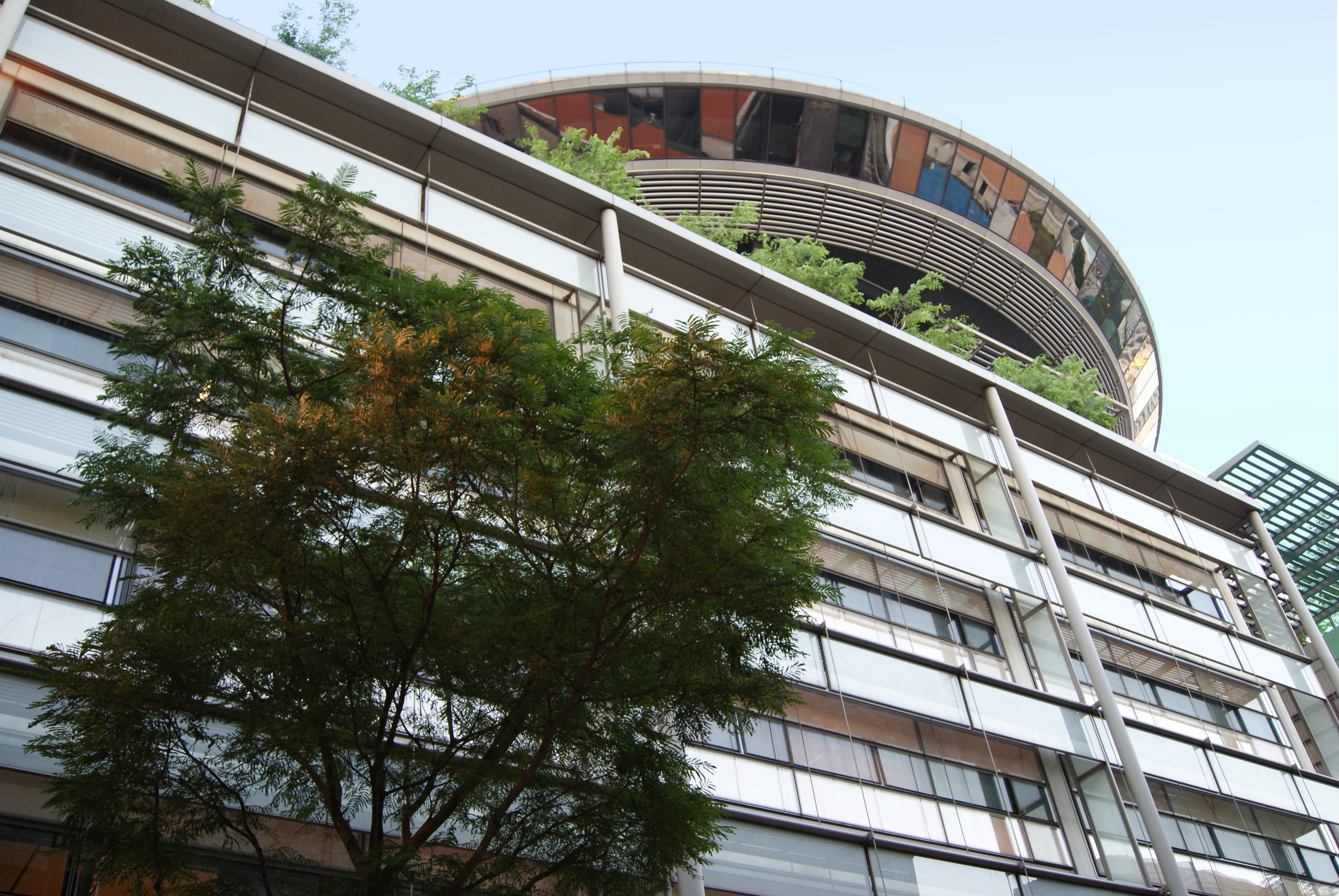
The Supreme Court of Singapore. Its lower division, the High Court, exercises judicial review to ensure that legislation and administrative acts are constitutional.

Judicial attitudes inextricably shape and mould the results of constitutional interpretation. This is because, during the process of constitutional interpretation, "the private philosophies and prejudices of individual judges will inevitably emerge". In 1980, when the British Privy Council was still Singapore's final appellate court, it held in Ong Ah Chuan v. Public Prosecutor that where the fundamental liberties in the Constitution are concerned, the courts are to accord them "a generous interpretation ... suitable to give to individuals the full measure of the fundamental liberties referred to".

However, it has been said that the Singapore judiciary has a conservative attitude when interpreting the Constitution as it seems to be "more protective of executive interests than individual freedoms". This is in line with the locally held judicial philosophy which features deference to the Parliament and a strong presumption of constitutional validity.

Such conservatism is reflected in the courts construing fundamental liberties narrowly in certain cases. For instance, in Rajeevan Edakalavan v. Public Prosecutor (1998), even though Article 9(3) of the Constitution states that "[w]here a person is arrested, he ... shall be allowed to consult and be defended by a legal practitioner of his choice", the High Court declined to hold that there is any constitutional right to be informed of one's right to counsel as the Constitution does not expressly mention such a right. Chief Justice Yong Pung How held:

Any proposition to broaden the scope of the rights accorded to the accused should be addressed in the political and legislative arena. The Judiciary, whose duty is to ensure that the intention of Parliament as reflected in the Constitution and other legislation is adhered to, is an inappropriate forum. The Members of Parliament are freely elected by the people of Singapore. They represent the interests of the constituency who entrust them to act fairly, justly and reasonably. The right lies in the people to determine if any law passed be [sic: by] Parliament goes against the principles of justice or otherwise. This right, the people exercise through the ballot box. The Judiciary is in no position to determine if a particular piece of legislation is fair or reasonable as what is fair or reasonable is very subjective. If anybody has the right to decide, it is the people of Singapore. The sensitive issues surrounding the scope of fundamental liberties should be raised through our representatives in Parliament who are the ones chosen by us to address our concerns. This is especially so with regards to matters which concern our well-being in society, of which fundamental liberties are a part.

On the other hand, in Yong Vui Kong v. Public Prosecutor (2010) decided 12 years later, the Court of Appeal held that colourable legislation which purports to enact a 'law' as generally understood but which is in effect a legislative judgment, and legislation which is "of so absurd or arbitrary a nature that it could not possibly have been contemplated by our constitutional framers as being 'law' when they crafted the constitutional provisions protecting fundamental liberties", would violate Article 9(1), despite the provision not explicitly referring to this.

In some cases, the courts have also demonstrated an unwillingness to consult foreign constitutional case law, and have crafted a "local conditions" rationale (Note: It was held in Tang Kin Hwa v. Traditional Chinese Medicine Practitioners Board [2005] SGHC 153, [2005] 4 S.L.R.(R.) 604 at 613–614, paras. 27–28, H.C. (Singapore), that English law which has been exported to many colonies has to be "cultivated with an acute awareness of the soil in which it has been transplanted", and thus close scrutiny for "appropriateness" on the basis on "general persuasiveness insofar as logic and reasoning are concerned" is warranted to serve the "ideal" of an "indigenous legal system sensitive to the needs and mores of the society of which it is a part". Therefore, foreign law should not be blindly followed "where either local conditions and/or reason and logic would dictate otherwise".) which prescribes reading the Constitution "within its own four walls and not in the light of analogies drawn from other countries such as Great Britain, the United States of America or Australia". This has been termed a conservative and restrictive approach that seems to undermine the court's duty to generously interpret fundamental liberties. However, it has been noted that this approach to constitutional interpretation was never applied consistently, and that "it appears that the 'four walls' doctrine has quietly fallen out of fashion at least in practice, as courts now regularly consider foreign cases which have only persuasive, not precedential value. ... It is fair to say that the development of Singapore public law is not accomplished in a cloister sealed off from transnational models, but through a thoughtful engagement with foreign cases."

A purposive approach to statutory interpretation was mandated in Singapore in 1993 by the enactment of section 9A of the Interpretation Act, which requires a court to prefer an interpretation that would "promote the purpose or object underlying the written law (whether that purpose or object is expressly stated in the written law or not) ... to an interpretation that would not promote that purpose or object". The Constitution of the Republic of Singapore Tribunal affirmed in Constitutional Reference No. 1 of 1995 that the approach applies to constitutional interpretation as well. It stated: "It is well established ... that a purposive interpretation should be adopted in interpreting the Constitution to give effect to the intent and will of Parliament".

The generous approach to constitutional interpretation mentioned in Ong Ah Chuan might be said to accord with the purposive approach because the use of broad and general language in Articles of the Constitution dealing with fundamental liberties suggests a parliamentary intention to give courts the discretion "to interpret the Constitution based on prevailing social conditions". It may also be noted that although the court may depart from previously held constitutional interpretations, it cannot disregard the text entirely.

===== Fundamental constitutional principles =====
The courts have been willing to uphold the spirit of the Constitution by recognising fundamental constitutional principles not expressly mentioned in the written Constitution which underlie the Constitution and form the theoretical basis of constitutionalism, its goal being to achieve limited government. Examples of these principles include accommodative secularism, the rule of law, and the separation of powers. Similarly, the court's power of judicial review is not expressly mentioned, but has been read into the Constitution by necessary implication from Article 4 of the Constitution.

Additionally, the courts have read into the Constitution extratextual principles which either have the effect of expanding or limiting the ambits of fundamental liberties. In Ong Ah Chuan, the Privy Council held that references to the word law in clauses such as Article 9(1) and Article 12(1) of the Constitution include "fundamental rules of natural justice", which were later held by the Court of Appeal to be procedural rather than substantive in nature. On the other hand, the courts have said that freedom of speech must be balanced against the right of other people to be free from offence, and have restricted freedom of religion in favour of "the sovereignty, integrity and unity of Singapore" which were said to be "undoubtedly the paramount mandate of the Constitution".

==== Other Acts of Parliament ====
Some ordinary statutes which are not part of the Constitution may serve constitutional functions and therefore be regarded as "essential to the workings of small-c constitutions". The Constitution itself empowers Parliament to enact laws for certain purposes. For instance, Article 17(2) states that "[t]he President shall be elected by the citizens of Singapore in accordance with any law made by the Legislature". To regulate such elections, Parliament passed the Presidential Elections Act. Similarly, the Parliamentary Elections Act fulfils the requirements of Article 39(1), which provides that Parliament consists, among other things, of elected Members of Parliament (MPs) and Non-constituency Members of Parliament (NCMPs) who have been elected according to the procedure prescribed in a law made by the Legislature. In addition, Article 63 states that "[i]t shall be lawful for the Legislature by law to determine and regulate the privileges, immunities or powers of Parliament", and Parliament has done so by enacting the Parliament (Privileges, Immunities and Powers) Act.

Thio Li-ann has suggested that other Acts which have constitutional significance include the Internal Security Act and the Supreme Court of Judicature Act.

=== Non-binding constitutional influences ===
==== Soft constitutional law ====
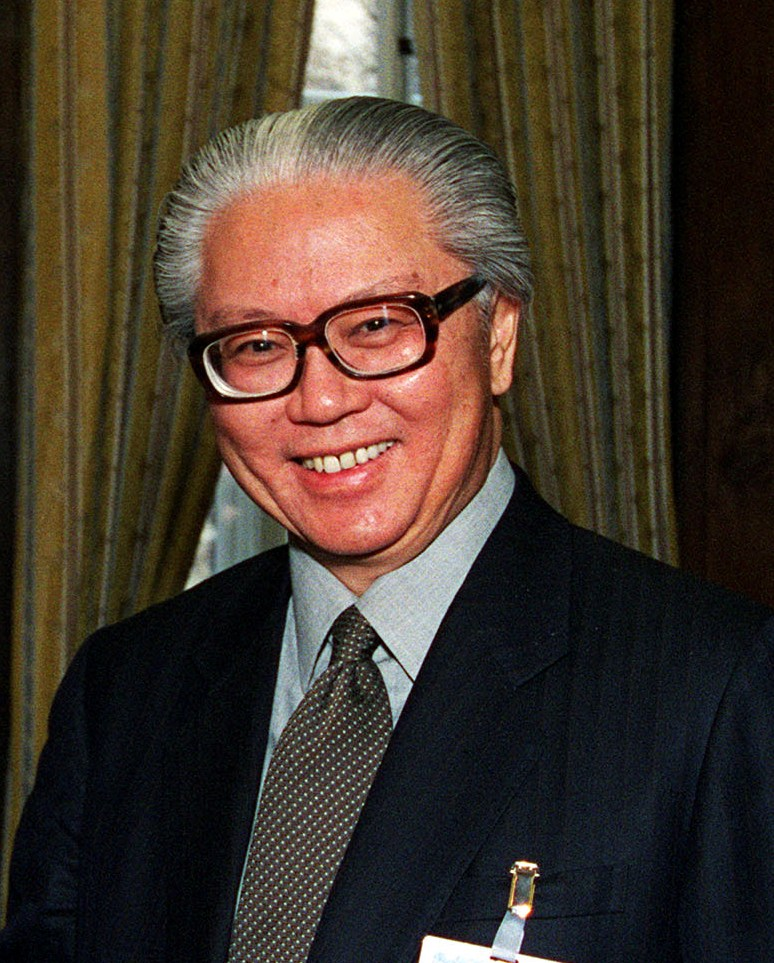
Dr. Tony Tan Keng Yam, the seventh President of Singapore, photographed in February 2001 before he took office. Interactions between his office and the Government concerning the exercise of his discretionary financial powers are governed by a non-binding white paper issued in 1999.

Soft constitutional law refers to a written set of non-binding precepts which exert some degree of legal influence in the realm of constitutional law. Forms of soft law include non-binding instruments containing recommendations, government white papers, declarations, and informal rules like circulars or self-regulating codes of conduct. Unlike constitutional conventions, soft constitutional laws are authored by constitutional actors and reduced to written form, rather than derived from a custom or past practice. Such soft laws act as a method of informal regulation against the backdrop of existing legislation.

Soft constitutional law can also serve as principles of engagement between institutions. One example is the 1999 white paper entitled The Principles for Determining and Safeguarding the Accumulated Reserves of the Government and the Fifth Schedule Statutory Boards and Government Companies, which contains non-exhaustive principles for shaping institutional interactions between the President and the Government concerning the exercise of the President's discretionary financial powers. One procedural guideline, which is not expressed in the Constitution, requires the President to inform the Government of his intention to gazette his opinion that one of its proposed transactions draws down on the nation's past reserves, to give the Government an opportunity to avoid such a draw-down by transferring an equivalent sum from the current reserves to the past reserves. The principles adopted in the white paper remain binding unless either (or both) the Government or the President formally notifies the other that it no longer wishes to abide by them.

Soft law has also been described by academics as a method of influencing communitarian conduct or even enforcing constitutional standards in a subtle manner. One example is the issuance of the Declaration of Religious Harmony in 2003, which was proposed by Prime Minister Goh Chok Tong in October 2002 following a series of domestic events which had heightened racial and religious sensitivities.

==== Constitutional conventions ====
Constitutional conventions are unwritten political customs which aid the smooth operation of the government. They are characterised as "rules of constitutional behaviour" which are "binding by and upon those who operate the Constitution", but are not legally enforceable. Such conventions which are consistently practised and not flouted become an intrinsic part of the constitution over time.

However, since Singapore now has a written constitution, conventions play a much less significant role. In comparison, countries such as the United Kingdom which lack a written constitution derive a major part of constitutional law from conventions. Back in Singapore's colonial days, the Government adopted many constitutional conventions from the United Kingdom. After independence, an attempt was made to incorporate many of these Westminster conventions into the new written constitution. For example, section 3 of the Parliament (Privileges, Immunities and Powers) Act – the Act was enacted pursuant to Article 63 of the Constitution – states that the privileges and immunities of Parliament are to be the same as those associated with the House of Commons of the United Kingdom. In addition, Article 21(1) of the Constitution embodies the constitutionally recognised Westminster convention that the President generally acts on the advice of the Cabinet.

Aside from adopted Westminster conventions, indigenous conventions have since developed or are developing to cater to local needs. During parliamentary debates in 1990 on the introduction of the Nominated Member of Parliament (NMP) scheme, the First Deputy Prime Minister and Minister for Defence, Goh Chok Tong, noted that the select committee tasked to look into the issue had considered whether NMPs should be required to sever any ties they had with political parties and decided that it was unnecessary as it was "far better to leave ... conventions and practice to evolve". In 2007, Law Minister S. Jayakumar declared that the Government "made it a practice to always seek the President's views whenever it intends to move Constitutional amendments that affect the relevant provisions" concerning his discretionary powers. It has also been said that by convention it is a well-accepted practice that the President engages in charitable and community welfare work without government objection.

==== Public international law ====
As Singapore adopts a dualist rather than a monist view of law, public international law rules are not part of domestic law and cannot be enforced by the courts unless they have first been incorporated into domestic law in some way. Customary international law is defined in the Statute of the International Court of Justice as "evidence of a general practice accepted as law". Rules of customary international law can be declared by courts to be part of domestic law under certain conditions. However, they are not a source of constitutional law, because the Court of Appeal held in Yong Vui Kong that such rules can only be declared as part of the common law and cannot be directly incorporated into the Constitution.

Unless an international treaty entered into by the Singapore Government has been given effect through an Act of Parliament, (Note: An example is the Geneva Conventions Act (Cap. 117, 1985 Rev. Ed.), which was enacted in 1973 to give effect to the Geneva Conventions in Singapore.) it cannot be enforced as domestic law by the courts. Nonetheless, such international obligations exert an influence on constitutional interpretation as the Court of Appeal has held that "the Singapore Constitution[ ] should, as far as possible, be interpreted consistently with Singapore's international legal obligations". However, it would not be appropriate for courts to refer to an international human rights norm if it does not accord with the way the constitutional text is worded, or if the history of the Constitution shows there was an intention to specifically exclude such a norm.

== Supremacy of the Constitution ==
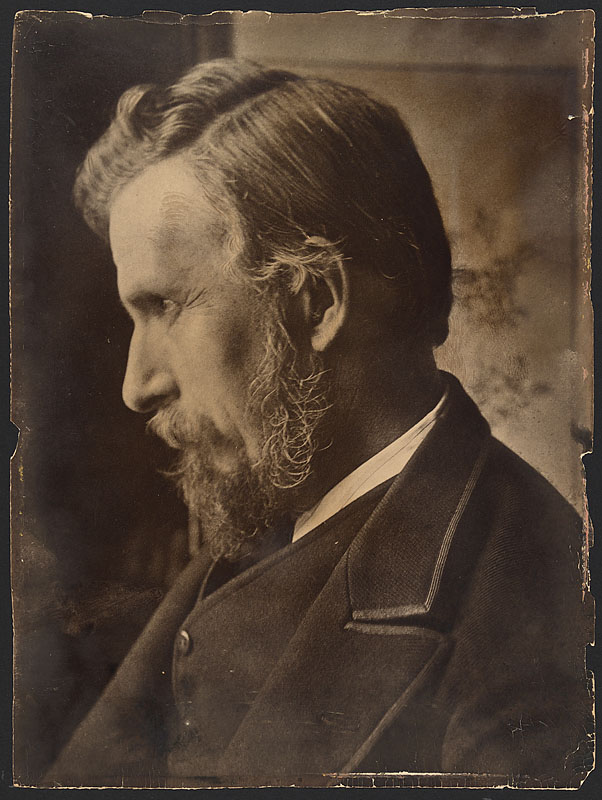
A.V. Dicey (1835–1922) from the Harvard Law School Library's Legal Portrait Collection. Dicey wrote that three criteria must be satisfied before a constitution can be regarded as supreme.

According to British jurist and constitutional theorist Albert Venn Dicey, three legal criteria must be satisfied before a constitution can claim to be supreme:

1. There must be codification, that is, the constitution must be written.
2. The constitution must be rigid.
3. Authority must be given to the courts to evaluate the constitutionality of legislative acts and declare them void if they are found to be inconsistent with the constitution.

Although Article 4 of the Singapore Constitution expressly declares that it is the supreme law of the land and the Constitution appears to satisfy Dicey's criteria, the view has been taken that it may not be supreme in practice and that Singapore's legal system is de facto characterised by parliamentary sovereignty.

=== Codification ===
Dicey's first legal criterion for a constitution to be regarded as supreme is that it must be written. This requirement is necessary for the precise identification of constitutional provisions, which makes it more convenient for Parliament to make constitutional amendments, and provides the judiciary with a basic text against which to determine the constitutionality of any ordinary legislation. Without a written constitution, judicial review would almost be counter to the doctrine of separation of powers as judges would get to decide the contents and wording of the Constitution. In Marbury v. Madison, the US Supreme Court held that "the powers of the legislature are defined and limited; and that those limits may not be mistaken, or forgotten, the Constitution is written".

However, in Singapore not all legal rules having constitutional effect appear to be part of the Constitution. For example, white papers that contain quasi-constitutional principles would be extra-constitutional documents. By issuing such white papers, the Government may also trying to set guidelines on how the Constitution should be interpreted. Jaclyn Neo and Yvonne Lee view such documents as diluting the Constitution and blurring the line between constitutional law and ordinary legislation.

=== Rigidity ===
The second legal criterion is that the constitution must be rigid. This is important to ensure that constitutional provisions can only be changed by an authority that is higher in status than the ordinary legislative body existing under the Constitution. However, rigidity does not mean that the Constitution is completely immutable. If the Constitution is static, the nation's political development may be stunted. Instead, rigidity of the Constitution merely contemplates that compared to ordinary legislation, the Constitution should be more difficult to amend.

Different amendment procedures apply to different parts of the Constitution. This is discussed in detail below. Most of the Articles of the Constitution may be amended by a bill enacted by Parliament if there is at least a supermajority of two-thirds of all elected MPs voting in favour of the bill during its Second and Third Readings in Parliament. Since ordinary bills only need to be approved by at least a simple majority of all the MPs present and voting, the supermajority requirement is more rigorous and gives the Constitution its rigid characteristic. However, the present ruling party, the People's Action Party (PAP) has commanded a majority of more than two-thirds of the seats in Parliament since 1968. In addition, due to the presence of the party whip, all PAP MPs must vote in accordance with the party line save where the whip is lifted, usually for matters of conscience. Thus, in substance the more stringent amendment requirement has not imposed any real limitation on Parliament's ability to amend the Constitution.

One reason for having a special constitutional amendment procedure is because constitutional supremacy requires the Constitution to endure in the long term with its main principles largely unchanged. However, in Singapore, this concept has been undermined by numerous major constitutional amendments made after 1979. These amendments, which significantly altered the structure and nature of the government in Singapore, introduced the Group Representation Constituency and Elected President scheme, and inducted NCMPs and NMPs into Parliament.

=== Judicial review ===
Dicey's third legal criterion for constitutional supremacy is the existence of an authority to pronounce upon the legal validity or constitutionality of laws passed by the nation's law-making body. While the Constitution does not expressly vest powers of constitutional judicial review in the courts, this role has been assumed by the judiciary. Hence, the third criterion appears to be fulfilled.

However, the judiciary has used its power to adjudge executive actions and Acts of Parliament unconstitutional and void rather sparingly. To date, the only instance where the High Court struck down a statutory provision was in Taw Cheng Kong v. Public Prosecutor (1998). It was short-lived, as the decision was later overturned by the Court of Appeal. Delivering the Court's judgment, Chief Justice Yong Pung How emphasised the limits of judicial review, stating that it is not for the courts to dictate the scope and ambit of a section or rule on its propriety. This is a matter which only Parliament can decide, and the courts can only interpret what is enacted. This results in a conflict between the court's responsibility to be faithful to the Constitution, and its apparently restricted role in reviewing legislation.

As mentioned earlier, the High Court also held that in judicially reviewing legislation, there should be a strong presumption of constitutional validity. The burden of proof falls on the applicant, who has to establish that the impugned statute violates the Constitution. Furthermore, in Rajeevan Edakalavan Chief Justice Yong said that the elected nature of Parliament vests in them the sole authority to determine sensitive issues surrounding the scope of fundamental liberties. In contrast, the judiciary's role is to ensure that the intention of Parliament as reflected in the Constitution and other legislation is adhered to. The Chief Justice also held in Jabar bin Kadermastan v. Public Prosecutor (1995) that:

Any law which provides for the deprivation of a person's life or personal liberty, is valid and binding so long as it is validly passed by Parliament. The Court is not concerned with whether it is also fair, just and reasonable as well.

Similarly, in Chee Siok Chin v. Minister for Home Affairs (2005), it was held that there is a need for judicial self-restraint and extreme caution with regards to whether a piece of legislation is an invalid restriction on constitutional rights. In the case, the impugned legislation was sections 13A and 13B of the Miscellaneous Offences (Public Order and Nuisance) Act ("MOA"), which make it an offence to cause harassment, alarm or distress. The High Court held that the fundamental right to freedom of speech and expression as well as the right to assembly guaranteed by Articles 14(1)(a) and (b) of the Constitution had been effectively restricted by the MOA. It held further that these rights are not absolute and are circumscribed by Article 14(2), which provides that Parliament may impose on the rights in Article 14(1) "such restrictions as it considers necessary or expedient" for various public interests. The term necessary or expedient was said to confer on Parliament an extremely wide discretionary power, the court's sole task being to ascertain whether there exists a nexus between the object of the impugned law and any permissible ground of restriction in Article 14(2). The Government must satisfy the court that there is a factual basis on which it considered it "necessary or expedient" to impose the restriction. Evidence establishing such a factual basis must be analysed in a generous and not a pedantic approach, considering the parliamentary intention of the impugned law.

=== The Grundnorm problem ===
Andrew Harding has posited that in Singapore it is Parliament, rather than the Constitution, which is supreme. This arises from the fact that the Constitution, which is supposed to be logically prior to the power of Parliament to legislate, was enacted by Parliament on 22 December 1965 through the Republic of Singapore Independence Act. As Parliament only got around to properly enacting a constitution on 22 December 1965, there was a hiatus between 9 August 1965 and that date, such that the legitimacy of laws passed between those dates can be questioned. Thus, the Grundnorm or basic norm of Singapore's legal system is Parliament rather than the Constitution.

On the other hand, Kenneth Wheare has theorised that Parliament obtains the necessary constituent power to bring a constitution into force simply by virtue of the election of its members into office. Since the constitution is a representation of the will of the people, and the people have exercised their will to elect MPs as their representatives, the Parliament has the requisite constituent power to enact the constitution. The hiatus was also solved when Parliament made the RSIA retrospective to 9 August 1965.

== Subjects dealt with by the Constitution ==
The Constitution deals with the following subjects in 14 parts:

| Part | Subject |
|---|---|
| I. | Preliminary |
| II. | The Republic and the Constitution |
| III. | Protection of the sovereignty of the Republic of Singapore |
| IV. | Fundamental liberties: Article 9: rights to life and personal liberty; Article 10: prohibition of slavery and forced labour; Article 11: protection against retrospective criminal laws and repeated trials; Article 12: rights to equality and equal protection; Article 13: prohibition of banishment and right to freedom of movement; Article 14: rights to freedom of speech, assembly and association; Article 15: right to freedom of religion; Article 16: right to equality in education |
| V. | The Government |
| VI. | The Legislature |
| VII. | The Presidential Council for Minority Rights |
| VIII. | The Judiciary |
| IX. | The Public Service |
| X. | Citizenship |
| XI. | Financial provisions |
| XII. | Special powers against subversion and emergency powers |
| XIII. | General provisions |
| XIV. | Transitional provisions |

=== Part I: Preliminary ===
This part gives the short title (despite there being no long title) to, defines certain terms and expressions used in, and establishes other rules for interpreting the Constitution.

=== Part II: The Republic and the Constitution ===
This part states that the Republic of Singapore is independent and that the Constitution is its supreme law (which is also the theoretical basis for judicial review in Singapore).

== Amendment ==
The Constitution stipulates two different amendment procedures for different purposes. Most of the provisions in the Constitution may be amended with a supermajority of votes of all the elected MPs. However, a national referendum is required to amend certain provisions. This highlights the varying importance accorded to different types of constitutional provisions.

While ordinary laws may be enacted with a simple majority of MPs present in Parliament voting in favour of them on their Second and Third Readings, Article 5(2) of the Constitution provides that a bill seeking to amend the Constitution can only be passed if it is supported by a supermajority of two-thirds of the elected MPs on the Second and Third Readings of the bill in Parliament. Non-elected MPs such as NCMPs and NMPs are not allowed to vote on constitutional amendment bills.

The above procedure does not apply to any bill seeking to amend Part III of the Constitution, which protects Singapore's sovereignty. Article 6, which is in Part III, prohibits the "surrender or transfer, either wholly or in part, of the sovereignty of the Republic of Singapore as an independent nation, whether by way of merger or incorporation with any other sovereign state or with any Federation, Confederation, country or territory or in any other manner whatsoever", and "relinquishment of control over the Singapore Police Force or the Singapore Armed Forces", unless this has been supported at a national referendum by not less than two-thirds of the total number of votes cast. Article 6 itself and other provisions in Part III cannot be amended unless a similar procedure is followed.

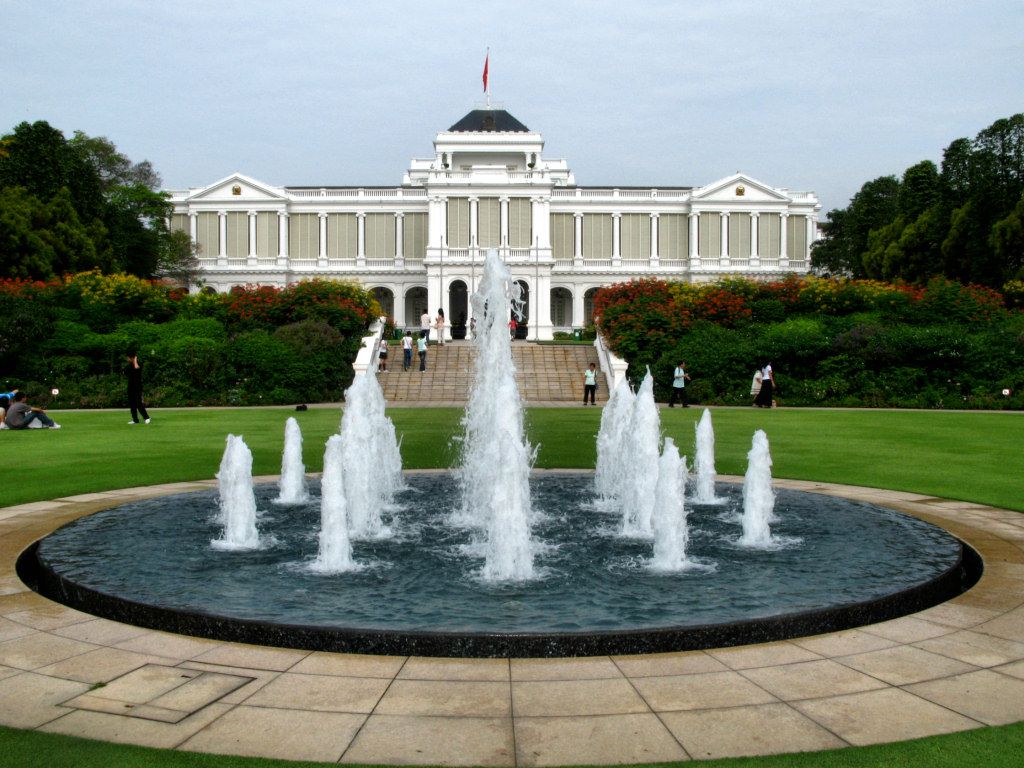
The Istana, the President’s official residence. Articles 5(2A) and 5A were repealed in 2016 and are no longer part of the Constitution. These articles would have required the President’s approval and a national referendum for certain changes, but they were never brought into force due to their complexity. The process of amending the Constitution now only requires a two-thirds majority in Parliament, without needing the President’s approval or a referendum.

The requirement for a national referendum also applies to Articles 5(2A) and 5A of the Constitution, though these provisions are not yet operational. Article 5(2A) states that unless the President, acting in his personal discretion, gives a contrary written direction to the Speaker, a bill seeking to amend certain key provisions in the Constitution requires the approval of at least two-thirds of the votes cast at a national referendum. Such amendments have been called core constitutional amendments. These key provisions are the fundamental liberties in Part IV of the Constitution; provisions in Chapter 1 of Part V which deal with the President's election, powers, maintenance, immunity from suit, and removal from office; Article 93A which gives the Chief Justice or a Supreme Court judge nominated by him jurisdiction to determine whether a presidential election is valid; Articles 65 and 66 which, among other things, fix the maximum duration of Parliament at five years from the date of its first sitting, and require a general election to be held within three months after a dissolution of Parliament; any provision authorising the President to act in his personal discretion; and Articles 5(2A) and 5A themselves.

Article 5A was introduced to deal with non-core constitutional amendments. The Article enables the President to veto proposed constitutional amendments that directly or indirectly circumvent or curtail the discretionary powers conferred on him by the Constitution. However, the power to veto is not absolute as the President may, acting on the Cabinet's advice, refer the matter to a constitutional tribunal under Article 100 for its opinion on whether a proposed amendment indeed has this effect. If the tribunal's view is different from the President's, the President is deemed to have assented to the bill on the day immediately following the day when the Tribunal pronounces its opinion in open court. However, if the tribunal upholds the President's view, the Prime Minister may refer the bill to a national referendum. The President's veto is overruled if not less than two-thirds of the total number of votes cast approve the proposed amendment. The President is deemed to have assented to the amendment on the day immediately following the day when the results of the referendum have been published in the Government Gazette. This scheme prevents a gridlock that may arise if the Government calls for a new election to circumvent the President's veto. Thus, Article 5A provides a series of legal checks and balances between the President on the one hand, and the Prime Minister and Cabinet on the other. It increases the Constitution's rigidity as the power to amend the Constitution is no longer vested solely in Parliament.

Articles 5(2A) and 5A have not yet been brought into force. In 1994, Deputy Prime Minister Lee Hsien Loong said this was because the complexity of the mechanism of both Articles surpassed what the Government had anticipated, and it was difficult to strike the fine balance between "the Government's need for operational flexibility" and the "President's duty to exercise effective oversight". On 21 October 2008, in response to a question by NMP Thio Li-ann about the status of Article 5(2A), Lee, now Prime Minister, said:

Our clear and stated intention is to refine the [Elected President] scheme and to iron out the issues that can arise in the light of experience, before we bring the entrenchment provisions into operation and entrench the rules. ... While we have delayed entrenching the scheme, we have, over the years, made a practice of consulting the President on any amendment which affects his powers, and informing Parliament of the President's view in the Second Reading speech. With one exception, in practice, the President has supported all the amendments which affected his powers. Over the last two decades, we have fine-tuned and improved the system of the Elected President in many ways. ... If after five years, no further major changes are necessary, we will consider entrenching the provisions concerning the President's custodial powers.

The Government has adopted a piecemeal approach towards constitutional amendments to deal with changing political and social circumstances.

=== Legislature's exercise of constituent power ===
Article 4 of the Constitution states that any law enacted by the Legislature which is inconsistent with the Constitution is, to the extent of the inconsistency, void. Interpreted literally, this Article seems to render Article 5 otiose as any law enacted to amend the Constitution will naturally be inconsistent with the existing text of the Constitution. To get around this conundrum, L.R. Penna has observed that the Malaysian courts have distinguished between the exercise of "constituent power" and "legislative power" by Parliament. In Phang Chin Hock v. Public Prosecutor (1979), Lord President Tun Mohamed Suffian Mohamed Hashim held that:

... in construing art 4(1) and art 159 [the Malaysian equivalent to Article 5 of the Singapore Constitution], the rule of harmonious construction requires us to give effect to both provisions and to hold and we accordingly hold that Acts made by Parliament, complying with the conditions set out in art 159, are valid even if inconsistent with the Constitution, and that a distinction should be drawn between on the one hand Acts affecting the Constitution and on the other hand ordinary laws enacted in the ordinary way.

The position in Singapore is unclear since this issue has not been raised before the courts. However, it is arguable that they are likely to apply Phang Chin Hock as Articles 4 and 159 of the Constitution of Malaysia are in pari materia with Articles 4 and 5 of the Singapore Constitution. Essentially, this will involve interpreting Article 5 as vesting constituent power in the Legislature to amend the Constitution, and Article 4 as striking down only ordinary laws enacted by the Legislature in the exercise of legislative power. Such an interpretation allows Articles 4 and 5 to be harmoniously construed, and permits amendments to be made to the Constitution. This is important as the Constitution represents the nation's philosophy, aims and objectives for attaining political stability and economic prosperity for the people, and thus must necessarily be adaptable to political and social developments.

=== Basic features doctrine ===
In addition to the need to uphold constitutional supremacy and the principle of rigidity, the Constitution is also a living document that can be amended where necessary. As the Constitution does not appear to place restrictions on the extent to which its provisions may be amended, the question of whether there are any implied restrictions on Parliament's power to amend the Constitution arises. If such limitations exist, they would serve as a safeguard against unrestrained amendment by the legislature and protect the essential constitutional features and structure. India takes this stand – the Supreme Court held in Kesavananda Bharati v. The State of Kerala (1973) that there are certain implied basic features of the Indian Constitution that are not amenable to changes and amendment by Parliament. On the other hand, in Singapore it has been established that there are no implied limitations on Parliament's power to amend the Constitution.

==== Position in India ====
The basic structure or basic features doctrine holds that there is an implied restriction on the powers of the legislature to amend the Constitution: it is precluded from amending the basic features of the Constitution. The landmark case of Kesavananda Bharati established that the doctrine applies in India, highlighting that while Parliament's power to amend the Constitution extends to all its sections, essential features of the Constitution must not be altered.

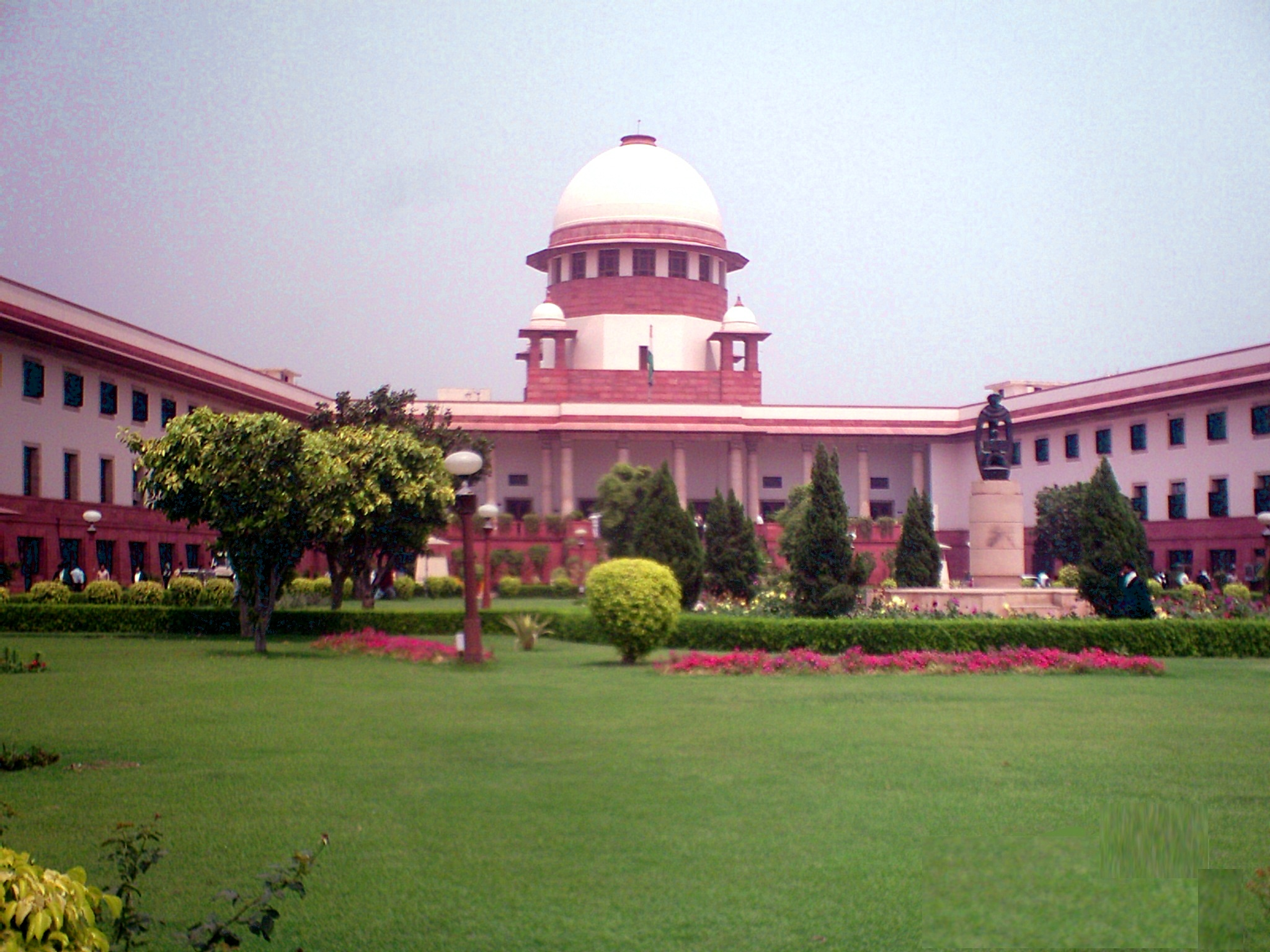
The Supreme Court of India which, in 1973, decided there are basic features of the Constitution of India that cannot be amended by Parliament

The development of the basic features doctrine in India can be attributed to the role of the judiciary in maintaining a balance between the powers of the Parliament and the judiciary. The Supreme Court perceived itself as the institutional guardian and protector of individual liberties against political aggression, adopting a judicial role parallel to that of the Supreme Court of the United States as mentioned by Chief Justice John Marshall in Marbury v. Madison.

Chief Justice Sarv Mittra Sikri, delivering the leading judgment of the Supreme Court, averred that "[e]very provision of the Constitution can be amended provided in the result the basic foundation and structure of the Constitution remains the same". He proceeded to lay down the basic structure of the Constitution, stating that it includes the supremacy of the Constitution; the republican and democratic form of government; the secular character of the Constitution; the separation of powers between the legislature, the executive and the judiciary; and the federal character of the Constitution. He said that these basic features are founded on the "dignity and freedom of the individual", which is of "supreme importance".

On the other hand, Justice Ajit Nath Ray dissented and gave reasons for rejecting the basic features doctrine. He stated that since the Constitution is the source of all legal validity and is itself always valid, a constitutional amendment, being part of the Constitution itself, will also always be valid. The power to amend the Constitution is wide and unlimited, and there is neither a distinction nor any possibility of a difference between essential and non-essential features of the Constitution that may impede amendment. In fact, if Parliament's power to amend is extinguished because of essential features that are not expressly defined in the Constitution, the courts would be creating a new constitution. Justice Ray presented other problems of the basic features doctrine, criticising it as being uncertain in scope. Without an evident definition of what the basic features are, the task of trying to amend the Constitution becomes unpredictable. In his view, all the provisions of the Constitution are essential but this does not prohibit them from being amendable.

==== Position in Singapore ====
In the High Court case of Teo Soh Lung v. Minister for Home Affairs (1989), the applicant's counsel argued that the Singapore courts should recognise the basic features doctrine and thereby limit the power of Parliament to amend the Constitution. The doctrine was rejected by Justice Frederick Arthur Chua. He noted that Article 5 of the Constitution does not place any limitations on Parliament's power to amend the Constitution, and concluded that if the framers of the Constitution had intended for such limitations to apply they would have expressly provided for them. Justice Chua also referred to the Malaysian case Phang Chin Hock, in which the Federal Court had rejected the basic features doctrine, stating that "if our Constitution makers had intended that their successors should not in any way alter their handiwork, it would have been perfectly easy for them to so provide; but nowhere in the Constitution does it appear that that was their intention". Moreover, if proposed constitutional amendments are only valid if they are consistent with its existing provisions this would render Article 159 of the Malaysian Constitution, which provides for amendment of the Constitution, "superfluous, for the Constitution cannot be changed or altered in any way, as if it has been carved in granite".

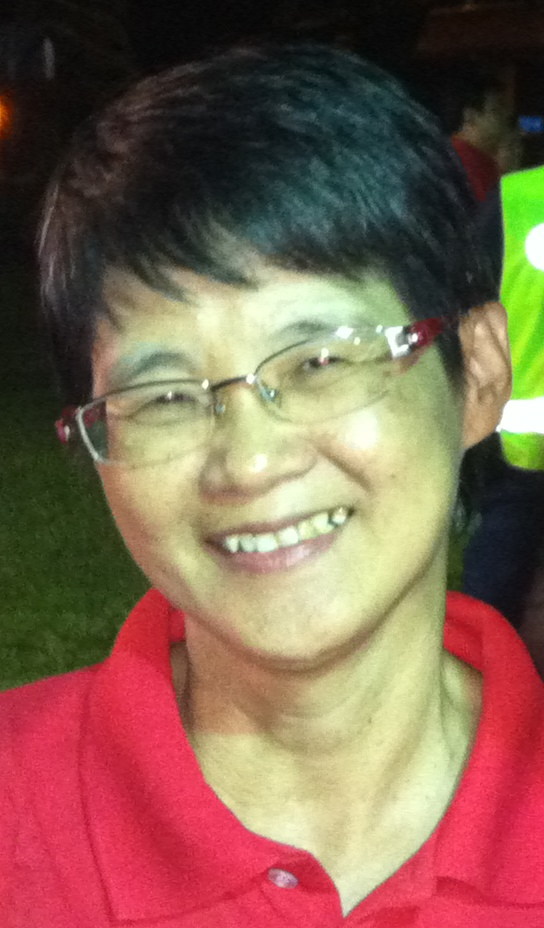
Teo Soh Lung at a Singapore Democratic Party rally for the 2011 general election. In a case brought by Teo in 1989, the High Court said that the basic features doctrine does not apply in Singapore.

Justice Chua emphasised that fears of abuse of power by the Parliament should not lead to a denial of the power to amend the Constitution or restrict this power. He referred to Loh Kooi Choon v. Government of Malaysia (1977), where the Malaysian Federal Court said: "The fear of abuse of Parliament's power to amend the Constitution in any way they think fit cannot be an argument against the existence of such power, for abuse of power can always be struck down". Furthermore, Chua asserted that allowing the courts to impose limitations on the legislature through the basic features doctrine, a judge-made rule, would amount to the judiciary usurping Parliament's legislative function. A similar view was expressed in Phang Chin Hock by the Chief Justice of Malaya, Raja Azlan Shah: "A short answer to the fallacy of this doctrine is that it concedes to the court a more potent power of constitutional amendment through judicial legislation than the organ for and clearly chosen by the Constitution for the exercise of the amending power." This could infringe the separation of powers doctrine and blur the distinction between the functions of the judiciary and the legislature.

The High Court in Teo Soh Lung also referred to Justice Ray's judgment in Kesavananda, stating that radical amendments should not always be disdained as they may bring about positive changes to ensure the smooth functioning of a nation. There are reasons for allowing the Constitution to be amended. New problems may arise in the future, and the Constitution may have to be modified to suit changing circumstances. According to Justice Ray: "The framers of the Constitution did not put any limitation on the amending power because the end of a Constitution is the safety, the greatness and well-being of the people. Changes in the Constitution serve these great ends and carry out the real purposes of the Constitution."

Justice Chua also relied on Lord Diplock's judgment in Hinds v. The Queen (1975), in which his Lordship expressed the view that even fundamental provisions of a constitution on the Westminster model can be amended as long as the proper procedure provided by the constitution has been complied with:

[W]here ... a constitution on the Westminster Model represents the final step in the attainment of full independence by the peoples of a former colony or protectorate, the constitution provides machinery whereby any of its provisions, whether relating to fundamental rights and freedoms or to the structure of the government and the allocation to its various organs of legislative, executive or judicial powers, may be altered by those people through their elected representatives in the Parliament acting by specified majorities ...

Additionally, Justice Chua said that due to the differences in the way the Singapore and Indian Constitutions were made, the Singapore Parliament's power to amend the Constitution is not limited in the manner the Indian Parliament's is when amending the Indian Constitution. The Indian Constitution was framed by a constituent assembly, while Singapore's Constitution was put together by the Parliament out of three different documents, namely, the 1963 State Constitution, the RSIA, and provisions drawn from the Federal Constitution of Malaysia. Parliament had plenary power to enact the RSIA from the political fact of Singapore's independence and status as a sovereign nation on 9 August 1965.

Penna has observed that the basic features doctrine appears to be irrelevant in Singapore as the word amendment is defined to include "addition and repeal" in Article 5(3) of the Constitution. "Amendment" connotes a change to the existing law that does not amount to doing away with such a law entirely. On the other hand, "repeal" implies the abrogation of the entire law by a different statutory provision that subsequently comes into force. If Parliament is entitled to repeal provisions of the Constitution, this means there is no constitutional hindrance to substituting the current Constitution for a completely different and new one. Thus, this suggests there is no place for the basic features doctrine in constitutional amendments. Similarly, Article 368(1) of the Indian Constitution, which was brought in by the Twenty-fourth Amendment, defines amendment as "addition, variation and repeal". In Kesavananda the Supreme Court had acknowledged the validity of the Twenty-fourth Amendment, yet Chief Justice Sikri seemed not to have considered the meaning of repeal when enunciating the basic features doctrine. Instead, he had merely focused on the fact that an "amendment" to the Constitution means any addition or change to it.

The High Court's decision in Teo Soh Lung remains the authority on whether the basic features doctrine applies in Singapore law, because when the decision was appealed the Court of Appeal held it was unnecessary for it to decide whether the power of Parliament to amend the Constitution can ever be limited. It left the issue open for decision in a future case.

=== Significant amendments ===
Since 9 August 1965 when the Constitution came into force, various amendments have been made to it. Some of the significant ones are listed below.

- 1965. The Constitution was made amenable by a simple majority of all the elected MPs in Parliament.
- 1970. The Presidential Council (renamed the Presidential Council for Minority Rights in 1973) was established to safeguard the rights of racial and religious minorities in Singapore. Its main function is to scrutinise most of the bills passed by Parliament to ensure that they do not discriminate against any racial or religious community.
- 1979. The proportion of elected MPs required to amend the Constitution was returned to a two-thirds supermajority during the Second and Third Readings of a constitutional amendment bill.
- 1984. Non-constituency Members of Parliament (NCMPs) were introduced.
- 1988. Group representation constituencies (GRCs) were introduced. These are electoral divisions or constituencies in Singapore, the MPs of which are voted into Parliament as a group. At least one member of each GRC must be a member of a minority community.
- 1990. Nominated Members of Parliament (NMPs) were introduced to bring non-partisan voices into Parliament.
- 1991. The Constitution was amended to provide for a popularly and directly elected president.
- 1994. The Constitution of the Republic of Singapore Tribunal was established to provide a mechanism for the President, acting on the Cabinet's advice, to refer to the Tribunal for its opinion any question as to the effect of any provision of the Constitution which has arisen or appears to likely to arise.
- 2016. The concept of reserved elections for a community that has not held the office of President for 5 or more consecutive terms was added.
- 2022. Parliament defined marriage as a union between a man and a woman, and was granted the right to protect that definition from legal challenges.
- 2023. Creation of a framework allowing the president and the cabinet to hold international appointments in their private capacities, if it is in line with national interests.

== See also ==
- Law of Singapore
