= Article 10 =

In law, Article 10 may refer to:

- Article 10 of the European Convention on Human Rights
- Article 10 of the Constitution of India, concerning Indian nationality law
- Article 10 of the Constitution of Malaysia
- Article 10 of the Constitution of Singapore
- Article X of the Texas Constitution
