= Article 13 =

Article 13 may refer to:

- Article 13 of the Constitution of Alaska, which sets procedures for constitutional amendment.
- Article 13 of the Constitution of Colorado, which states about impeachments.
- Article 13 of the Constitution of Connecticut, which creates the method of calling for a special convention to amend or revise the constitution.
- Article 13 of the Constitution of the Federated States of Micronesia, which consists of general provisions.
- Article 13 of the Constitution of India, laws inconsistent with or in derogation of the fundamental rights to be void
- Article 13 of the Constitution of Italy, which is the Italian equivalent of a bill of rights in common law jurisdictions.
- Article 13 of the Constitution of Japan, which asserts the right of the people "to be respected as individuals" and, subject to "the public welfare", to "life, liberty, and the pursuit of happiness".
- Article 13 of the Constitution of Louisiana, which provides for two methods of amending the Constitution, by either Legislative action or convention.
- Article 13 of the Constitution of Malaysia, which provides that no person may be deprived of property save in accordance with law.
- Article 13 of the Constitution of Mexico, which states that there are no private courts in Mexico.
- Article 13 of the Constitution of Mississippi, which states how the State will be apportioned into State Senatorial and State Representative districts after every Federal census, and that the State Senate shall consist of no more than 52 Senators and the State House shall consist of no more than 122 Representatives.
- Article 13 of the Constitution of Missouri, which states about public employees.
- Article 13 of the Constitution of Nebraska, which states about state, county, and municipal indebtedness.
- Article 13 of the Constitution of North Carolina, which describes the two ways the constitution may be amended: by popular convention or through legislation.
- Article 13 of the Constitution of the Philippines, which divulge the utmost responsibility of the Congress to give the highest priority in enactments of such measures which protects and enhances the rights of all the people to human dignity through affirming that present social, economic and political inequalities as well as cultural inequities among the elites and the poor shall be reduced or removed in order to secure equitable welfare and common good among Filipino people.
- Article 13 of the Constitution of Singapore, which prohibits banishment and guarantees freedom of movement.
- Article 13 of the Constitution of Tajikistan, which guarantees natural resources' efficient use in the interest of the people.
- Article 13 of the Constitution of Texas, which established provisions for Spanish and Mexican land titles from the Mexican War Era to please the Mexican government.
- Article 13 of the European Convention on Human Rights, which provides for the right to an effective judicial remedy for violations of rights under the convention.
- Article 13 of the European Union Directive on Copyright in the Digital Single Market, which would expand legal liability for websites.
- Article 13 of the Fundamental Law of Vatican City State, which gives The Councillor General and the Councillors of the State, named by the Supreme Pontiff for a five-year term, the responsibility to offer their assistance in the drafting of Laws and in other matters of particular importance.
