= Article 12 of the Constitution of Singapore =

Guarantee of Equality before the Law

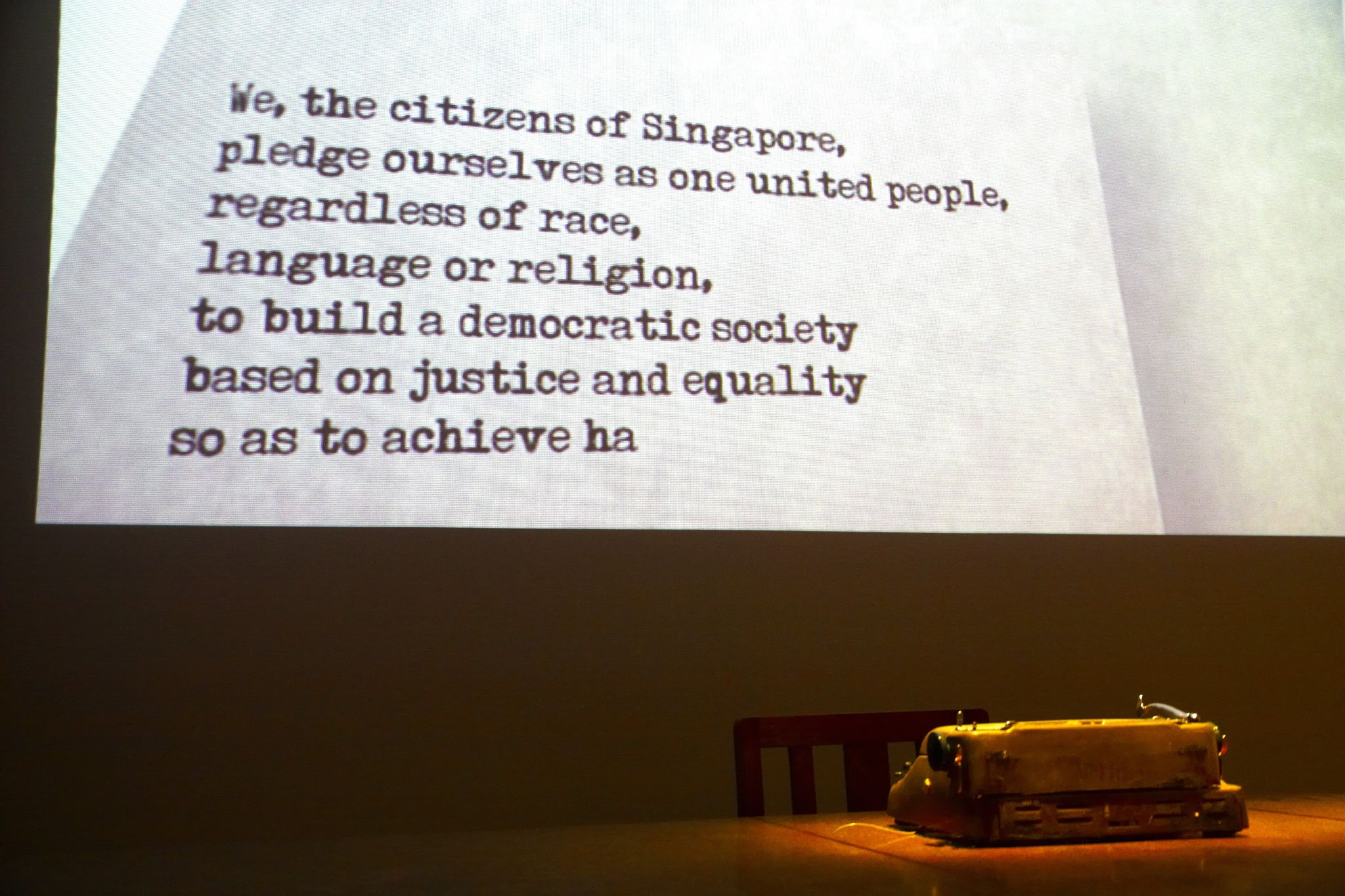
An animated display at the National Museum of Singapore featuring a portion of the Singapore National Pledge. When reciting it, Singapore citizens pledge to "build a democratic society based on justice and equality".

Article 12 of the Constitution of the Republic of Singapore guarantees to all persons equality before the law and equal protection of the law. The Article also identifies four forbidden classifications – religion, race, descent and place of birth – upon which Singapore citizens may not be discriminated for specific reasons. For example, discrimination on those classifications is prohibited in the appointment to any office or employment under a public authority or in the administration of any law relating to the establishing or carrying on of any trade, business, profession, vocation or employment.

Persons unable to show that one of the forbidden classifications applies to them may try to argue that they are members of a group defined by a law in a way that violates the general guarantee of equality and equal protection. To succeed, they must establish that the classification used in the law fails the rational nexus test, which is a three-stage test formulated by the courts. The first stage of the test involves an examination as to whether the law differentiates amongst classes of individuals. At the second stage, the court considers if the differentiation is founded on an intelligible differentia or distinguishing feature. Finally, the basis of the differentiation must bear a reasonable relation to the object of the statute. However, the test is not foolproof as a classification may satisfy the test even if the object of the law is itself illegitimate. The rational nexus test, as it is currently applied in Singapore, also tolerates over- and under-inclusive classifications. It remains to be seen if local courts will consider other approaches to the issue, such as the three-tier system of scrutiny applied in the United States, the proportionality analysis applied in the United Kingdom to other areas of human rights law, or the reasonableness approach taken by some judges in India and Malaysia.

The rational nexus test does not apply where a statute treats all persons equally, but it is alleged that the authorities have applied the statute in a discriminatory manner. Instead, a modified rational nexus test is used, which requires a court to consider whether there is a reasonable nexus between the state action taken and the object of the law. Such a nexus will be absent if the action amounts to intentional and arbitrary discrimination or intentional systematic discrimination. It is insufficient if any inequality is due to inadvertence or inefficiency, unless this occurs on a very substantial scale. In addition, inequalities arising from a reasonable administrative policy or which are mere errors of judgment are insufficient to constitute a violation of Article 12(1).

Article 12(3) of the Constitution provides that Article 12 does not invalidate or prohibit any provision regulating personal law; or any provision or practice restricting office or employment connected with the affairs of any religion, or of an institution managed by a group professing any religion, to persons professing that religion.

== Text of Article 12 ==
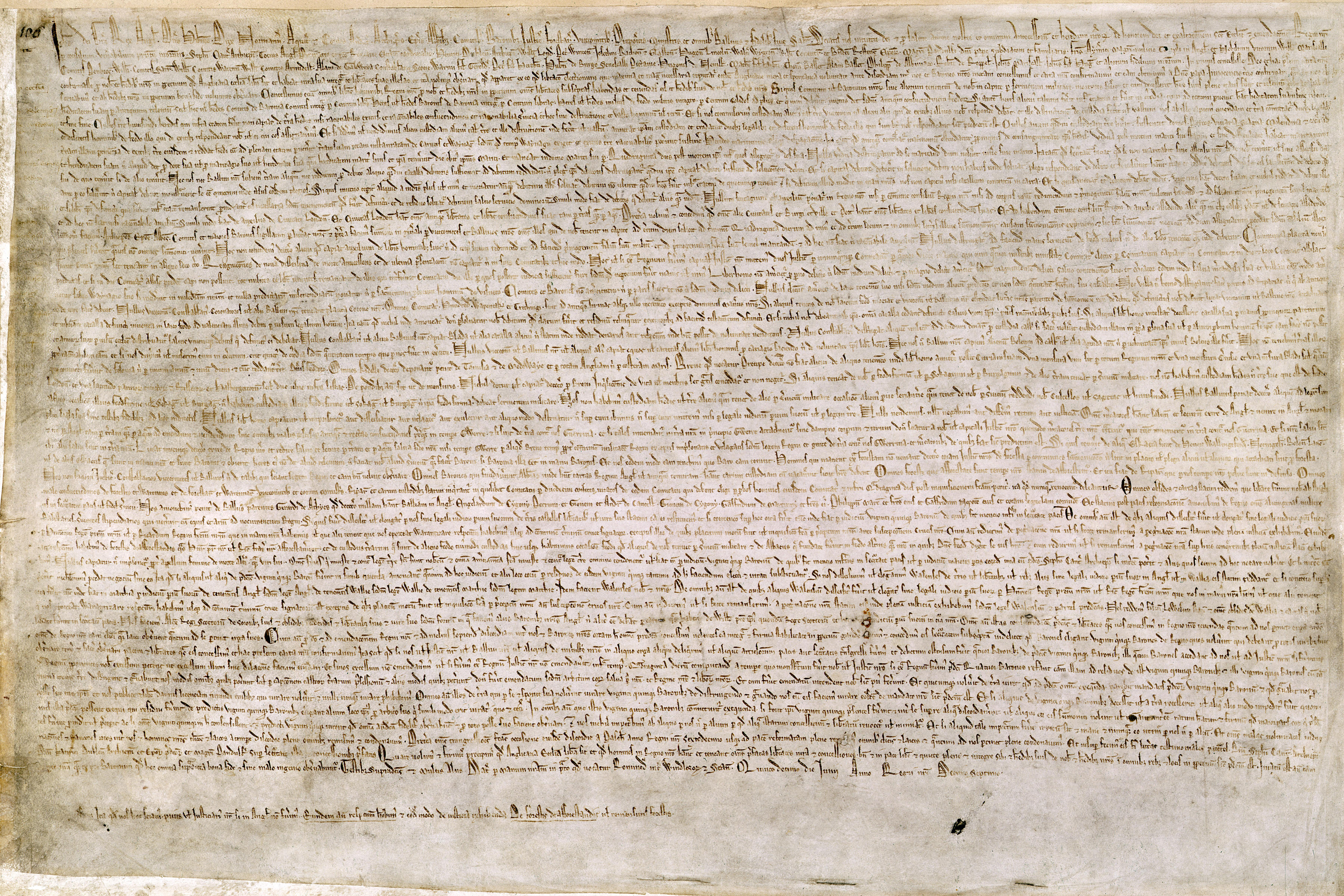
A copy of the Magna Carta of 1215 in the collection of the British Library. In a 1998 decision, the Court of Appeal of Singapore traced the concept of equality embodied in Article 12(1) of the Constitution to the 40th article of this document.

Article 12 of the Constitution of the Republic of Singapore is entitled "Equal protection" and reads as follows:

12.— (1) All persons are equal before the law and entitled to the equal protection of the law.

(2) Except as expressly authorised by this Constitution, there shall be no discrimination against citizens of Singapore on the ground only of religion, race, descent or place of birth in any law or in the appointment to any office or employment under a public authority or in the administration of any law relating to the acquisition, holding or disposition of property or the establishing or carrying on of any trade, business, profession, vocation or employment.

(3) This Article does not invalidate or prohibit —

(a) any provision regulating personal law; or
(b) any provision or practice restricting office or employment connected with the affairs of any religion, or of an institution managed by a group professing any religion, to persons professing that religion.

In the 1998 decision Public Prosecutor v. Taw Cheng Kong, the Court of Appeal regarded the concept of equality as a component of the wider doctrine of the rule of law, and traced its origin to the 40th article of the Magna Carta of 1215 which states: "To none will we sell, to none will we deny, to none will we delay right or justice." Article 12(1) of the Constitution bears a strong resemblance to the Equal Protection Clause of the Fourteenth Amendment to the United States Constitution which prohibits any state from denying "to any person within its jurisdiction the equal protection of the laws", and to Article 14 of the Constitution of India which bars the state from denying "to any person equality before the law or the equal protection of the laws within the territory of India". Article 12(1) is identical to Article 8(1) of the Constitution of Malaysia, from which it was adopted following Singapore's independence from Malaysia in 1965.

In Lim Meng Suang v. Attorney-General (2013), the High Court noted that the concept of equality before the law is derived from English common law which requires all classes of persons to be equally subject to the law, while the concept of equal protection of the law stems from the US Constitution's Fourteenth Amendment and guarantees both procedural and substantive equality. The Court said:

It will be seen that equality before the law and equal protection of the law are but different aspects of the same doctrine – equal justice. The first expresses the immutable principle of equal subjection of all classes of persons to the law, and the second is the positive aspect of that principle which reaches out, when invoked, to strike down unequal laws and discriminatory administrative or executive action as unconstitutional and void.

== Discriminatory classification ==
=== Forbidden classifications ===
Article 12(2) of the Constitution prohibits discrimination against Singapore citizens (unlike Article 12(1) which applies to "all persons") "on the ground only of religion, race, descent or place of birth" in the following situations:

- In any law.
- In the appointment to any office or employment under a public authority.
- In the administration of any law relating to (1) the acquisition, holding or disposition of property; or (2) the establishing or carrying on of any trade, business, profession, vocation or employment.

The word only raises the possibility that discrimination may be permissible on the basis of one of the proscribed grounds in combination with some other factor, such as age or state of health.

Article 12(2) is subject to an express contrary authorization by the Constitution. Article 39A empowers the Legislature to ensure that members of the Malay, Indian and other minority communities are represented in Parliament by enacting a law to create Group Representation Constituencies (GRCs). Each voter in a GRC casts his or her ballot for a team of candidates, at least one of whom must be from a minority community. Article 39A(3) exempts any provision enacted by Parliament pursuant to Article 39A from being void due to inconsistency with Article 12.

Another provision that is rescued from potential invalidity by Article 12(2) is the Government's constitutional mandate to exercise its functions in such a way as to recognize the special position of the Malays, who are the indigenous people of Singapore. The Government has a responsibility to "protect, safeguard, support, foster and promote their political, educational, religious, economic, social and cultural interests and the Malay language". The Constitution also requires the Legislature to enact legislation to regulate Muslim religious affairs and to establish a council to advise the President concerning matters relating to Islam. The legislation in question is the Administration of Muslim Law Act.

=== Other discriminatory classifications: the rational nexus test ===
Aggrieved persons who cannot avail themselves of the protection afforded by Article 12(2) may try to argue that they are a member of a group defined by a law in a way that violates Article 12(1). The rational nexus test, also known as the doctrine of reasonable classification, is a three-stage test formulated by the courts to determine if the manner in which a law classifies a group of persons is discriminatory. The equality guaranteed by the provision is a relative and not an absolute concept; it does not require that all persons are treated alike, but rather that all persons in like situations should be treated alike. Consequently, a law that differentiates between classes of persons is valid and constitutional provided that there is some difference in circumstances, and the factor which the legislature adopts as constituting the dissimilarity in circumstances is not purely arbitrary but bears a reasonable relation to the legislative object of the law. If there is no such relationship, the difference is discriminatory and the impugned legislation is unconstitutional and invalid.

==== History ====
In 1909, the Supreme Court of the United States propounded a test to determine the reasonableness of a classification, stating that the classification "must always rest upon some real and substantial distinction bearing a reasonable and just relation to the things in respect to which the classification is made". Based on this principle, the Supreme Court of India subsequently formulated a two-stage test to determine if a classification made by a law was constitutional. The relevant stages were (1) whether the classification was founded on an intelligible differentia; and (2) whether the differentia had a rational relation to the object sought to be achieved by the law in question.

The Federal Court of Malaysia later adapted the rational nexus test by including an additional preceding stage, namely, whether the law was discriminatory. This three-stage inquiry was accepted in Singapore in the case Kok Hoong Tan Dennis v. Public Prosecutor (1996).

==== Stages of the test ====
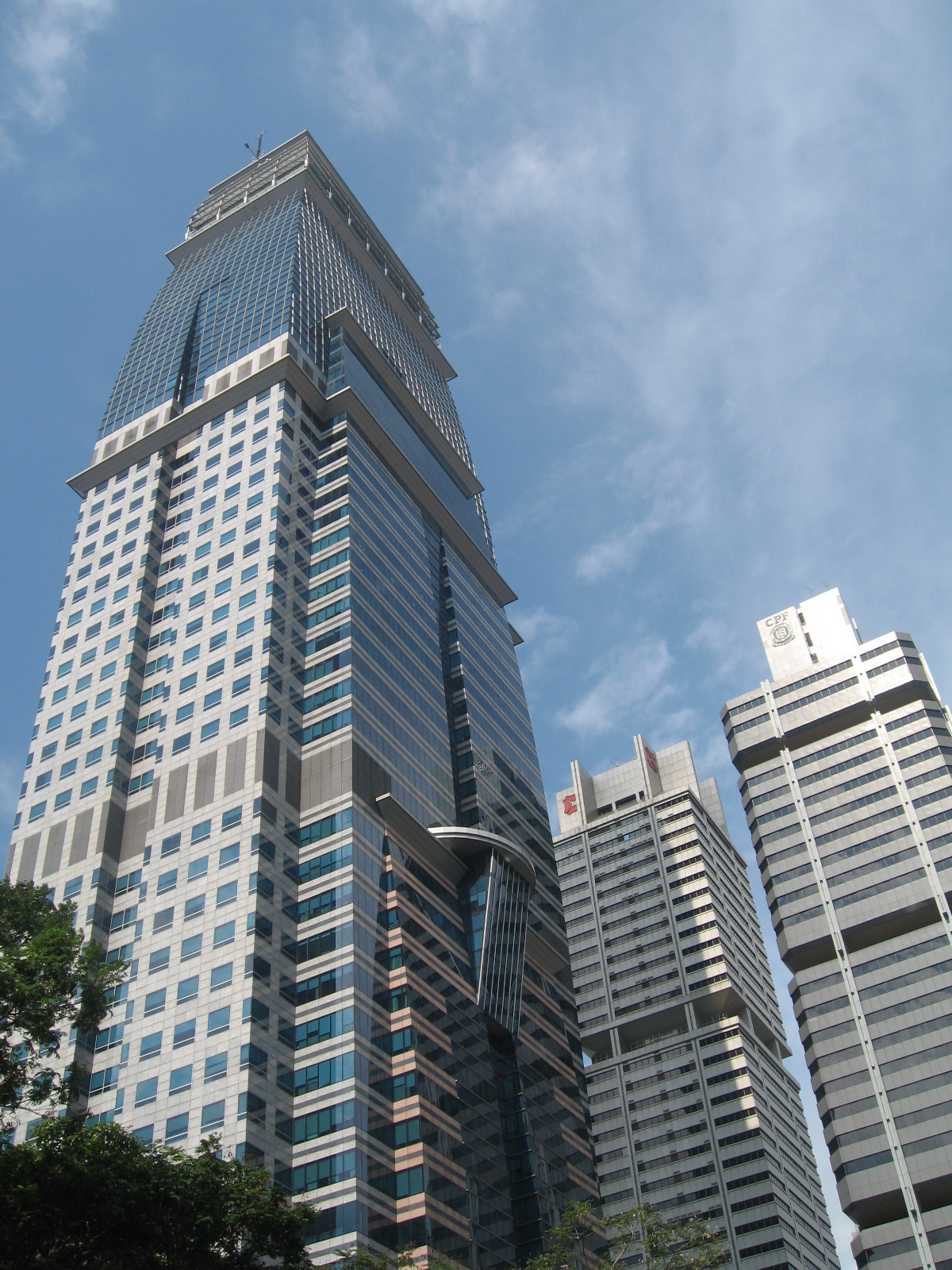
Capital Tower, where the Government of Singapore Investment Corporation (GIC) is headquartered. In 1998, the Court of Appeal restated the rational nexus test applicable to Article 12(1) in a case involving a regional manager of GIC convicted of corruption.

The test that is currently followed in Singapore was re-expressed by the Court of Appeal in Taw Cheng Kong (1998) as comprising three stages:

1. Whether the law differentiates – that is, prescribes different treatment – amongst classes of individuals.
2. Whether the differentiation is founded on an intelligible differentia (distinguishing feature).
3. Whether the basis of differentiation bears a reasonable relation to the object of the statute.

The purpose of the test is to ensure that the right to equal protection is upheld by guarding against three forms of arbitrariness. First, individuals in the same class must share common features and should not be classified arbitrarily. Secondly, the treatment of persons falling within the same class must not be arbitrary. Lastly, the basis of classification must not be arbitrary but should bear a reasonable relationship to the object of the executive action. The stages of the rational nexus test directly address these forms of arbitrariness. As such, a law that satisfies all the stages of the test will be found to be valid and constitutional.

===== Stage 1: Whether the law differentiates =====
The first stage of the test considers whether the law prescribes different treatment for one group of individuals as against other groups. For example, in the 1998 High Court decision Taw Cheng Kong v. Public Prosecutor, Judge of Appeal M. Karthigesu found that the Prevention of Corruption Act differentiated between classes of people as it renders some, but not all, persons open to criminal prosecution in Singapore for offences committed outside Singapore.

While earlier cases expressed this stage of the test as a determination of whether a law is discriminatory, the Court of Appeal has warned against the confusing of the concepts of differentiation and discrimination. A differentiating law is one that draws distinctions between groups of people. A discriminatory law or executive act, on the other hand, is one that contravenes Article 12(1) and hence is unconstitutional. Therefore, the mere finding of a differentiating measure in this first stage does not necessarily make the law discriminatory, as the other two stages will still have to be taken into consideration. If the impugned statute does not contain such a differentiating measure, it is a good law and the objection fails.

Even if a differentiating measure is found, there is a strong presumption that it is constitutional. The legislature must necessarily have a wide power of classification in making laws that operate differently for different groups of people in order to give effect to its policy. Unless the law is plainly arbitrary, suggesting examples of arbitrariness are not ordinarily helpful in rebutting this presumption of constitutionality. It is presumed that Parliament knows best for its people, and is experienced in making laws directed at societal problems, hence its differentiation is based on adequate grounds. Therefore, to rebut this presumption it is necessary for the person challenging the law to adduce some material or factual evidence to show that it was enacted arbitrarily or had operated arbitrarily.

===== Stage 2: Intelligible differentia =====
The second stage of the rational nexus test looks at whether the basis for differentiation is founded on an intelligible differentia which distinguishes those who are grouped together from those left outside the group. To satisfy the second stage, there must be a discernible basis of classification. All persons being discriminated against by a law must share a common identifying mark that is not borne by those not discriminated against. Examples of such features include gender, age, race, religion, seniority of professional qualification and area of residence. Another feature that has been accepted by the courts as constituting an intelligible differentia is Singapore citizenship. Singling out a person or object with characteristics not peculiar to itself, but which may conceivably be found in other persons or objects, does not constitute classification. If there is no consistent means of identifying the persons treated differently, the differentiation is arbitrary and the law is invalid. If there is an intelligible differentia, the differentiation is not arbitrary in this sense and it is necessary to proceed to the third stage.

Equality under Article 12(1) does not require that all persons are treated alike, but rather that all persons in like situations should be treated alike. Similarly, failing to treat differently persons whose situations are significantly different also amounts to inequality. As such, at the second stage the question to be considered is whether persons falling within the same class are treated equally. Article 12(1) prohibits laws which require that some individuals within a single class should be treated more harshly than others. However, the law is not unconstitutional if all persons discriminated against are equally discriminated against, and all persons not discriminated against are equally not discriminated against. The courts have found this stage to be satisfied where under a statute all citizens are equally liable to prosecution, whereas all non-citizens are equally immune from it. The second stage test was also found to have been satisfied where all members of the Singapore Congregation of Jehovah's Witnesses found to have been in violation of the Societies Act were treated equally.

===== Stage 3: Reasonable relation to statutory objective =====
In this stage, it is necessary to inquire into, firstly, the object of the statute, and secondly, whether the basis of differentiation against or for a particular class is a reasonable means of achieving such an object. The essence of the test is whether it is reasonable, taking into consideration the object of the statute, to distinguish between persons on the selected basis of differentiation. As such, it is necessary to ask how the differentiation against or for one particular class furthers the object of the statute. The law is not arbitrary if the basis for discrimination has a rational relation to the object sought to be achieved, and the statute will be declared valid and constitutional.

In Taw Cheng Kong, the respondent challenged his conviction for corruption on the ground that section 37 of the Prevention of Corruption Act, which extends the effect of the Act to corrupt acts by Singapore citizens (but not non-citizens) occurring outside Singapore, discriminated against citizens and thus violated Article 12(1). The Court of Appeal held that the distinction drawn by the section 37 between citizens and non-citizens who are abroad is valid as it is a reasonable means of achieving the Act's object, which is to address acts of corruption taking place outside Singapore but affecting events within it. The exclusion of non-citizens from the ambit of section 37 observes international comity and the sovereignty of other nations.

==== Criticisms of the test ====
===== Unreasonable legislative objectives =====
In equal protection cases, the purpose of the law must be distilled before the reasonableness of a classification can be judged. When the purpose of the law is not explicitly stated, the court may conclude that there is no legitimate public purpose, assume that there is a legitimate public purpose but refuse to look for it, or draw some inferences as to what it is. When the purpose of the law is explicitly stated, the court may either accept it at face value; or challenge the integrity of the legislative declaration, looking behind the explicit purpose to determine the true purpose. In the latter situation, what is concerned is the discriminatory character of the legislation. The need to identify the legislative purpose has been said to involve the court in the "thornier aspects of judicial review", because it must either "uncritically and often unrealistically accept a legislative avowal at face value" or "challenge legislative integrity and push beyond the express statement into unconfined realms of inference". The court must then "make a judgment as to the purity of legislative motive and ... determine the legitimacy of the end".

This step is necessary because the rational nexus test is not foolproof. The test is based on the presumption that the legislative object itself is not in violation of the Constitution. However, if the object of the statute is itself illegitimate, a classification may be invalid even if it satisfies the test. Hence, the test is only applicable if the object of the impugned legislation is a proper one.

In India, a solution was proffered by means of a more holistic approach to the constitutional promise of equality. In Maneka Gandhi v. Union of India (1978), the learned Justice Prafullachandra Natwarlal Bhagwati noted that "an essential element of equality pervades Article 14", the equivalent of Singapore's Article 12. With that as a starting point, he went on to assert that "the procedure ... must be right and just and fair and not arbitrary". The judge in Maneka Gandhi therefore spoke for a dynamic approach to equality, one that should not be "subjected to a narrow, pedantic or lexicographic approach". This more liberal approach, which accords courts the latitude to deal with legislation backed by arbitrary or unreasonable objectives, was cited with approval in Malaysia by the learned Judge of the Court of Appeal Gopal Sri Ram in Tan Tek Seng v. Suruhanjaya Perkhidmatan Pendidikan (1996). It is unclear, though, if this test will be applied in Singapore due to a dearth of case law on the matter.

===== Over- and under-inclusiveness =====
Another problem encountered when applying the rational nexus test is that of over- and under-inclusiveness. Under-inclusiveness occurs when the legislative classification fails to embrace all persons within the ambit of the objective sought to be achieved by the law. On the other hand, over-inclusiveness occurs when the classification not only embraces persons within the ambit of the legislative objective, but also persons outside it. Both over- and under-inclusiveness are currently tolerated in Singapore under the rational nexus test, as a classification can still bear a rational relation to the legislative objective notwithstanding that it embraces more or less persons than its object requires.

It has been argued that this results in the different treatment of persons in like situations, and thus violates Article 12(1). Although a rational connection exists between the classification adopted and the legislative object, the effect of an under-inclusive classification is to accord different treatment to persons similarly placed. However, the courts have often justified under-inclusiveness on the ground that the legislature is free to recognize degrees of harm, to confine its restrictions to cases where the need is felt to be the greatest, and to advance its policies step by step. Despite this, resort to legislative wisdom to justify under-inclusiveness, if used indiscriminately, may result in the watering down of the equal protection guarantee provided by Article 12(1).

Gordon Hirabayashi in 1986. In a 1943 case brought by him, the US Supreme Court upheld the constitutionality of an executive order imposing on American citizens of Japanese ancestry a curfew and an obligation to register for removal from a designated military area, even though it was over-inclusive.

Similarly, where an over-inclusive classification is concerned, a rational relation still exists between the differentia adopted and the legislative object. Thus, it is tolerated under the rational nexus test in Singapore. While the effect of an over-inclusive classification may be to accord similar treatment to persons differently placed, courts have nonetheless justified it on the ground that the exigencies of the situation require such classification. The US Supreme Court case Hirabayashi v. United States (1943) is an example of this principle. Following the Japanese attack on Pearl Harbor on 7 December 1941, President Franklin D. Roosevelt issued an executive order requiring, among other things, all persons of Japanese ancestry within a designated military area to be "within their place of residence between the hours of 8 p.m. and 6 a.m." and to report to the authorities to register for removal from the military area. The defendant, Gordon Hirabayashi, was convicted of violating the curfew and the registration requirement. The order was arguably over-inclusive as it did not distinguish between Japanese Americans who were loyal to the US and those in respect of which there was evidence of disloyalty. Although the Court noted that distinctions between citizens solely on the basis of ancestry "are, by their very nature, odious to a free people whose institutions are founded upon the doctrine of equality", because the US was at war with Japan the race-based classification bore a rational relation to the aim of the order, which was to protect from sabotage war materials and utilities in areas believed to be in danger of Japanese invasion and air attack. The Court said: "We cannot close our eyes to the fact, demonstrated by experience, that, in time of war, residents having ethnic affiliations with an invading enemy may be a greater source of danger than those of a different ancestry."

In Taw Cheng Kong, the High Court was of the view that section 37(1) of the Prevention of Corruption Act was both under- and over-inclusive. It did not apply to non-Singapore citizens such as permanent residents and foreigners working for the Government who received bribes for acts which would be done in Singapore. On the other hand, it would catch a Singapore citizen now a foreign permanent resident employed in a foreign country by a foreign government who received a bribe in relation to a transaction that had nothing to do with Singapore. For this reason, Karthigesu J. found section 37(1) to be unconstitutional since the nexus between the classification and section 37(1)'s objective was not reasonable enough to justify derogating from Article 12(1). The High Court's decision was reversed by the Court of Appeal, which held that the under-inclusiveness was not fatal because of the "overriding need to observe international comity". In any case, "[t]he enactment of a provision need not be seamless and perfect to cover every contingency. Such a demand would be legislatively impractical, if not impossible." The over-inclusiveness of section 37(1) was deemed irrelevant to the constitutional issue because the provision applied equally to all Singapore citizens.

==== Applications of the rational nexus test ====
The rational nexus test was applied in Mohamed Emran bin Mohamed Ali v. Public Prosecutor (2008), in which the High Court was faced with the issue of whether the failure to prosecute drug enforcement authorities in an entrapment case amounted to discrimination against the persons eventually charged with drug trafficking. The Court found that there was a "perfectly rational nexus between entrapment operations and the socially desirable and laudable objective of containing the drug trade" as convicting state agents who carried out covert operations would result in illicit drug suppliers prospering and flourishing while enforcement agencies would "wither and perish". Further, the exercise of the Attorney-General's prosecutorial discretion was an executive act which satisfied the rational nexus test and was therefore not in contravention of Article 12 of the Constitution.

In Yong Vui Kong v. Public Prosecutor (2010), the Court of Appeal had to determine the validity of a differentiating factor prescribed by the legislature for distinguishing between different classes of offenders for sentencing purposes. In that case, the differentiating factor was found in the Misuse of Drugs Act ("MDA"), which stipulated that an accused trafficking in more than 15 grams (0.53 oz) of diamorphine (heroin) would result in him or her facing a mandatory death penalty upon conviction. Following its previous decision in Nguyen Tuong Van v. Public Prosecutor (2005), which had applied Ong Ah Chuan, the Court applied the rational nexus test and found that the 15-gram differentia bore a reasonable relation to the social object of the MDA. The Court also noted that the "quantity of addictive drugs trafficked is not only broadly proportionate to the quantity of addictive drugs brought onto the illicit market, but also broadly proportionate to the scale of operations of the drug dealer and, hence, broadly proportionate to the harm likely to be posed to society by the offender's crime." Although Taw Cheng Kong was not cited in this case, the test applied was substantially similar to that which it enunciated in Taw Cheng Kong.

==== Alternatives to the rational nexus test ====
In other jurisdictions, courts have applied standards of judicial review more exacting than the rational nexus test in Singapore when deciding if a law is unconstitutional. It remains to be seen whether any of these approaches will be adopted locally.

===== Three-tiered scrutiny =====
In footnote 4 of United States v. Carolene Products Co. (1938), Justice Harlan F. Stone opined that where legislation was aimed at "discrete and insular minorities" who lack the normal protections of the political process, a more exacting standard of judicial review with no presumption of constitutionality should be applied.

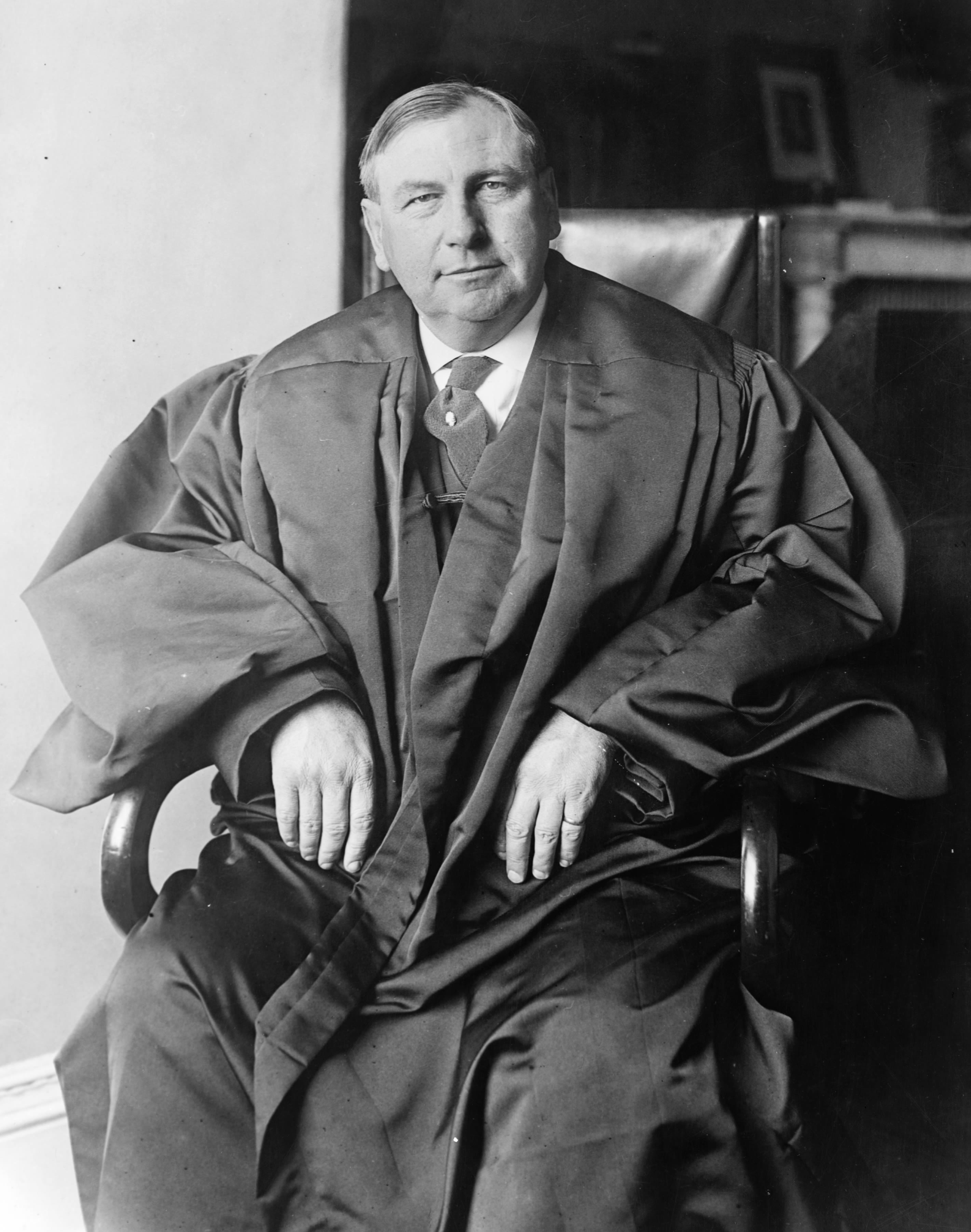
Justice Harlan Fiske Stone (1872–1946) photographed c. 1925–1932. Stone J. authored the well-known footnote 4 of United States v. Carolene Products Co. (1938), which suggested that a stricter standard of judicial review should be applied to legislation impacting upon "discrete and insular minorities".

At present in the United States there are three different levels of scrutiny. Firstly, if a law categorizes on the basis of race or national origin (which are regarded as suspect classifications), or infringes a fundamental right, strict scrutiny is applied. Accordingly, the law is unconstitutional unless it is narrowly tailored to serve a compelling government interest. In addition, there should not be a less restrictive alternative available to achieve that compelling interest. Secondly, if the law categorizes on the basis of gender, legitimacy or similar quasi-suspect classifications, intermediate scrutiny is applied – the law is unconstitutional unless it is substantially related to an important government interest. Finally, the traditional rational basis review is applied if the law categorizes on some other, non-suspect, basis. In this case, the law is constitutional so long as it is reasonably related to a legitimate government interest.

In Malaysian Bar v. Government of Malaysia (1987), the Supreme Court of Malaysia referred to the strict scrutiny approach but asserted that in reality it was not very different from the traditional rational nexus standard, which it then proceeded to apply. The Court's endorsement of strict scrutiny was much less ambiguous in Government of Malaysia v. V.R. Menon (1990). It held that the impugned Act was concerned with economic and social welfare and not fundamental rights, and therefore the trial judge had erred in applying a stricter standard of review. As such, the court implicitly endorsed the application of the strict scrutiny test in cases concerning fundamental rights in Malaysia.

There are several criticisms of the three-tiered scrutiny analysis, the most compelling reason against its adoption arguably being that it does not control judicial discretion: the identification of classifications as suspect, quasi-suspect or non-suspect involves unconstrained balancing of public and private interests, and political and social interests.

===== Test of proportionality =====
The test of proportionality in English law, which is applied to determine whether a fundamental right is appropriately restricted by legislation, has three limbs:

1. The legislative objective must be sufficiently important to justify limiting the fundamental right.
2. The measures designed to meet the legislative objective must be rationally connected to it.
3. The means used to impair the right must be no more than is necessary to accomplish the objective.

It has been suggested that a proportionality analysis better safeguards equality compared to the American three-tiered scrutiny approach. The third limb of the proportionality test may also serve to strike down over-inclusive classifications which are currently tolerated under the rational nexus test.

===== Test of reasonableness =====
In Maneka Gandhi, Bhagwati J. appeared to suggest that the rational nexus test should not be applied to Article 14 of the Indian Constitution, which guarantees equality before the law and equal protection of the law, because it led to a narrow and pedantic interpretation of the provision. He held that Article 14 should not be construed too narrowly as it was the pillar on which the foundation of the Indian Democratic Republic rested. In his view, the principle of reasonableness was an essential element of equality or non-arbitrariness, and it pervaded Article 14 "like a brooding omnipresence".

A test of reasonableness was applied to Article 8(1) of the Malaysian Constitution in some cases, but it was later rejected by the Federal Court in Danaharta Urus Sdn. Bhd. v. Kekatong Sdn. Bhd. (2004). The Court noted that in cases subsequent to Maneka Gandhi the reasonable classification test had been applied, even by Bhagwati J. himself. Furthermore, equality under Article 8(1) does not mean absolute equality, but only assures the right to equal treatment with other individuals in similar circumstances. The rational nexus test is needed to determine if a law applies equally to all persons in the same group, and is therefore an "integral part" of Article 8(1).

== Discriminatory application of laws ==
The traditional Taw Cheng Kong rational nexus test is inappropriate where the issue is not the existence of discriminatory classification in a statute, but discriminatory application of a neutral statute. This is because the statute would inevitably pass the test as the answer to whether the legislation in question differentiates between different classes of persons (stage 1 of the Taw Cheng Kong test) will always be in the negative. In Eng Foong Ho v. Attorney-General (2009), Judge of Appeal Andrew Phang, delivering the judgment of the Court of Appeal, applied a modified form of the Taw Cheng Kong test, holding that "[t]he question is whether there is a reasonable nexus between the state action and the objective to be achieved by the law".

Phang J.A. relied on the principles set out in the Privy Council cases Howe Yoon Chong v. Chief Assessor (1980) and Howe Yoon Chong v. Chief Assessor (1990), drawing the following salient points from them:

- An executive act may be unconstitutional if it amounts to intentional and arbitrary discrimination. Thus, an intentional systematic undervaluation of property would breach Article 12(1) of the Constitution, though "something less might perhaps suffice".
- However, absolute equality is not attainable and inequalities arising from "the application of a reasonable administrative policy" or "mere errors of judgement" are not sufficient to constitute a violation of Article 12(1). Inequalities due to "inadvertence or inefficiency" need to be on "a very substantial scale" to violate the Article.

Thio Li-ann has expressed the view that Phang J.A.'s approach in Eng Foong Ho leaves room for judicial clarification. An important question is whether the "intentional and arbitrary discrimination" test, which implies the lack of any rationality, is the sole test for proving that an executive act violates Article 12, or only one possible test. If it is the only test, then the need to prove the absence of rationality is excessively onerous for the plaintiff to satisfy, compared to the "reasonable classification" test. She posits that it is preferable for both the "intentional and arbitrary discrimination" test and the "reasonable classification" test to apply to executive acts.

== Restrictions on the right to equality and equal protection ==
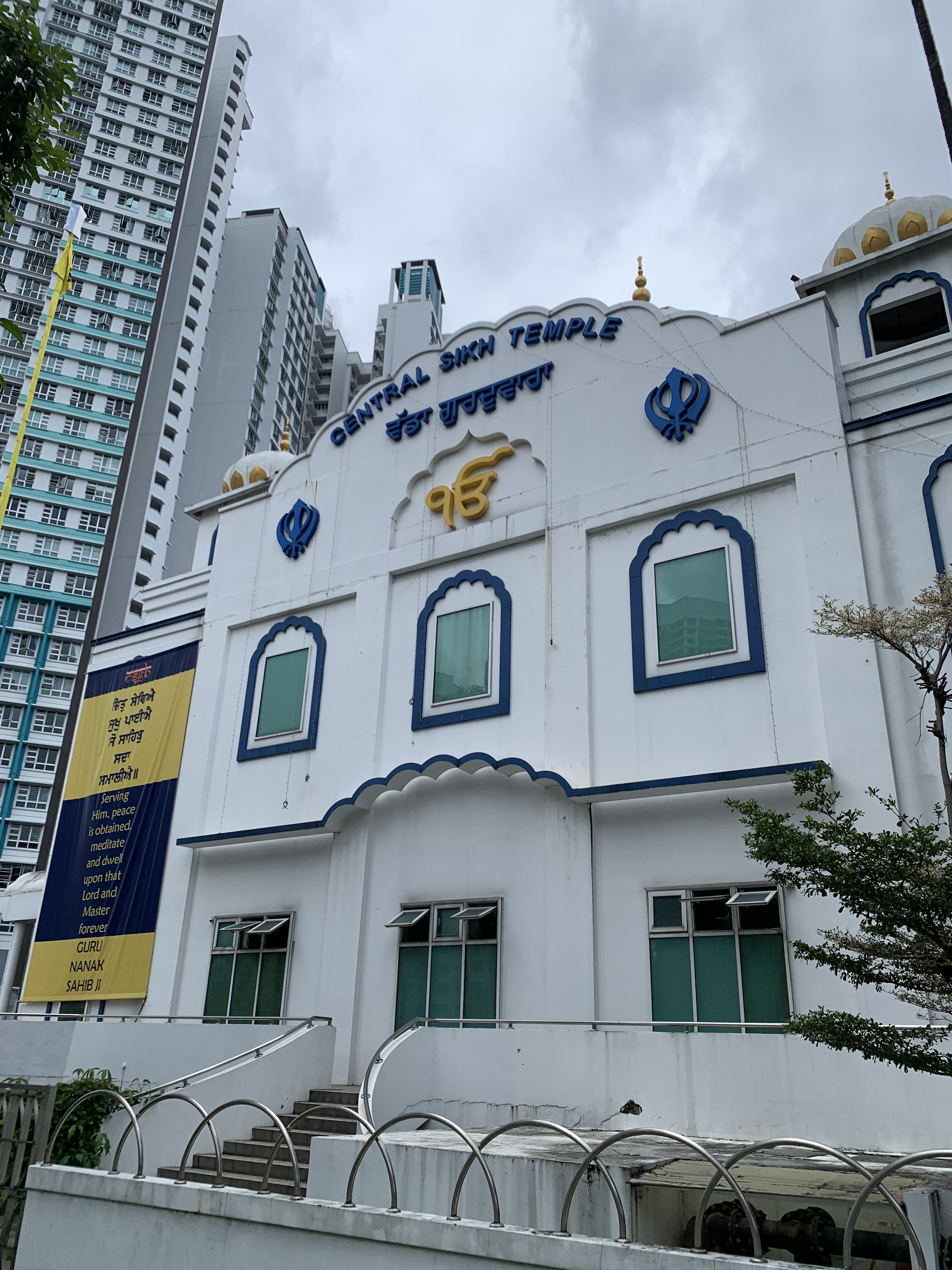
Singapore's oldest gurdwara, the Central Sikh Temple. Laws such as the Central Sikh Gurdwara Board Act are exempt from compliance with Article 12.

Article 12(3) of the Constitution provides that Article 12 does not invalidate or prohibit any provision regulating personal law; or any provision or practice restricting office or employment connected with the affairs of any religion, or of an institution managed by a group professing any religion, to persons professing that religion.

Personal law is the law governing a person's family matters. In Shafeeg bin Salim Talib v. Fatimah binte Abud bin Talib (2009), the High Court identified a number of personal laws, including the Intestate Succession Act which does not apply to Muslims; and regulations 103(2) and (3) of the Prisons Regulations, which respectively state that Jewish prisoners can claim an exemption against working on Saturdays and may observe certain festival days as may be allowed by the Government, and that Muslim prisoners may fast during Ramadan and have their work reduced during this period.

A number of private Acts establishing religious organizations expressly confine membership of their governing boards to persons professing the respective religions. For instance, a person may only be appointed to the Hindu Endowments Board, which administers Hindu religious and charitable endowments, if he or she is Hindu. Similarly, one may only be a member of the Central Sikh Gurdwara Board, which manages gurdwaras (Sikh temples) in Singapore, if one professes the Sikh faith.

Article 149(1) immunizes the Internal Security Act from invalidity due to inconsistency with five of the fundamental liberty provisions in the Constitution, including Article 12. The reference to Article 12 in Article 149(1) was enacted by Parliament in 1989 to reverse the effect of Chng Suan Tze v. Minister for Home Affairs (1988), in which the Court of Appeal expressed the view that sections 8 and 10 of the Act violated Article 12(1).

== Other constitutional provisions ==
Article 16(1) of the Constitution prohibits discrimination against citizens of Singapore on the ground only of religion, race, descent or place of birth in the administration of public educational institutions (and, in particular, as regards the admission of students or the payment of fees), and in providing financial aid from public funds for the maintenance or education of students in any educational institution. This provision is stated to be "[w]ithout prejudice to the generality of Article 12". Article 16(2) declares that religious groups have the right to establish and maintain institutions for the education of children and to provide them religious instruction in those institutions, but there must not be any discrimination on the ground only of religion in laws relating to such institutions or the administration of such laws.

Article 154 states that all persons who are in the same Government service grade must be treated impartially regardless of their race, subject to the terms and conditions of their employment and to other provisions of the Constitution.

The Constitution also establishes a procedure for ensuring that statutes do not contain "differentiating measures", that is, measures which discriminate against any racial or religious community. Most bills that have been passed by Parliament must be scrutinized by a non-elected advisory body called the Presidential Council for Minority Rights (PCMR), which must report to the Speaker of Parliament if it is of the view that any clause in a bill contains a differentiating measure. If the PCMR submits an adverse report, Parliament can either make amendments to the bill and resubmit it to the council for approval, or decide to present the bill for the President's assent nonetheless provided that a Parliamentary motion for such action has been passed by at least two-thirds of all Members of Parliament. The PCMR has not rendered any adverse reports since it was set up in 1970.
