= Article 16 =

Article 16 can refer to:

- Article 16 of the Northern Ireland Protocol
- Article 16 of the European Convention on Human Rights
- Article 16 of the Constitution of the Hellenic Republic
- Article 16 of the Constitution of Singapore
- Article 16 of the Constitution of India, regarding equality of opportunity in public employment
