= Article 13 of the Constitution of Singapore =

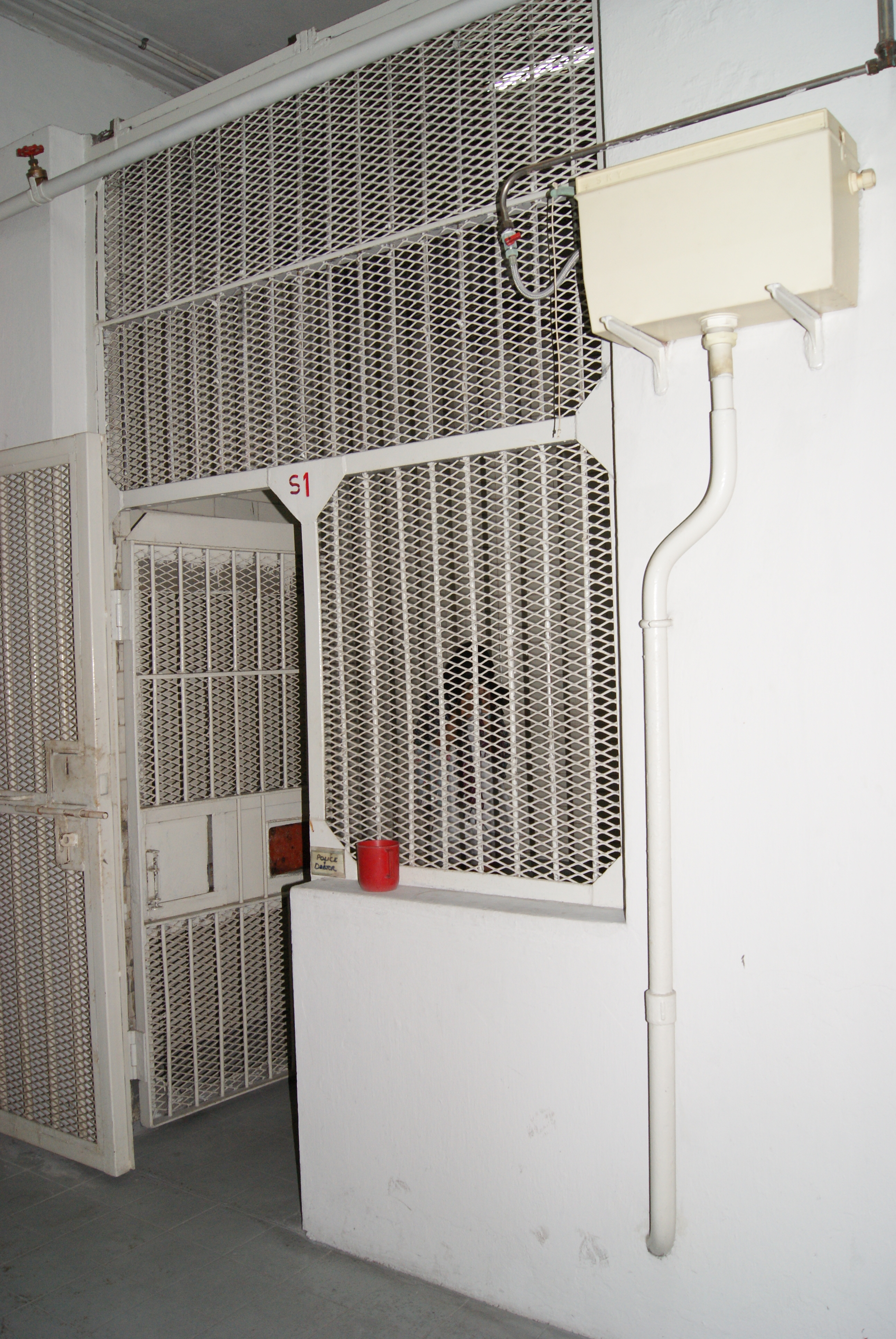
A cell of the Old Supreme Court Building lock-up. Article 9 of the Constitution guarantees the rights to life and personal liberty and other rights of arrested persons, but these rights are not absolute.

Article 13 of the Constitution of the Republic of Singapore, guarantees a prohibition against banishment and the right to freedom of movement.

== Text of Article 13 ==
Article 13 of the Constitution of the Republic of Singapore guarantees to all persons a prohibition against banishment and the right to freedom of movement. It states:

Article 13. Prohibition of banishment and freedom of movement

(1) No citizen of Singapore shall be banished or excluded from Singapore.

(2) Subject to any law relating to the security of Singapore or any part thereof, public order, public health or the punishment of offenders, every citizen of Singapore has the right to move freely throughout Singapore and to reside in any part thereof.

Article 13(1) embodies the concept of the rule of law, an early expression of which was the 39th article of the Magna Carta of 1215: "No freeman shall be ... exiled ... except by the lawful judgment of his peers or by the law of the land."

== Prohibition Against Banishment and Freedom of Movement ==
=== Meaning of Banishment ===
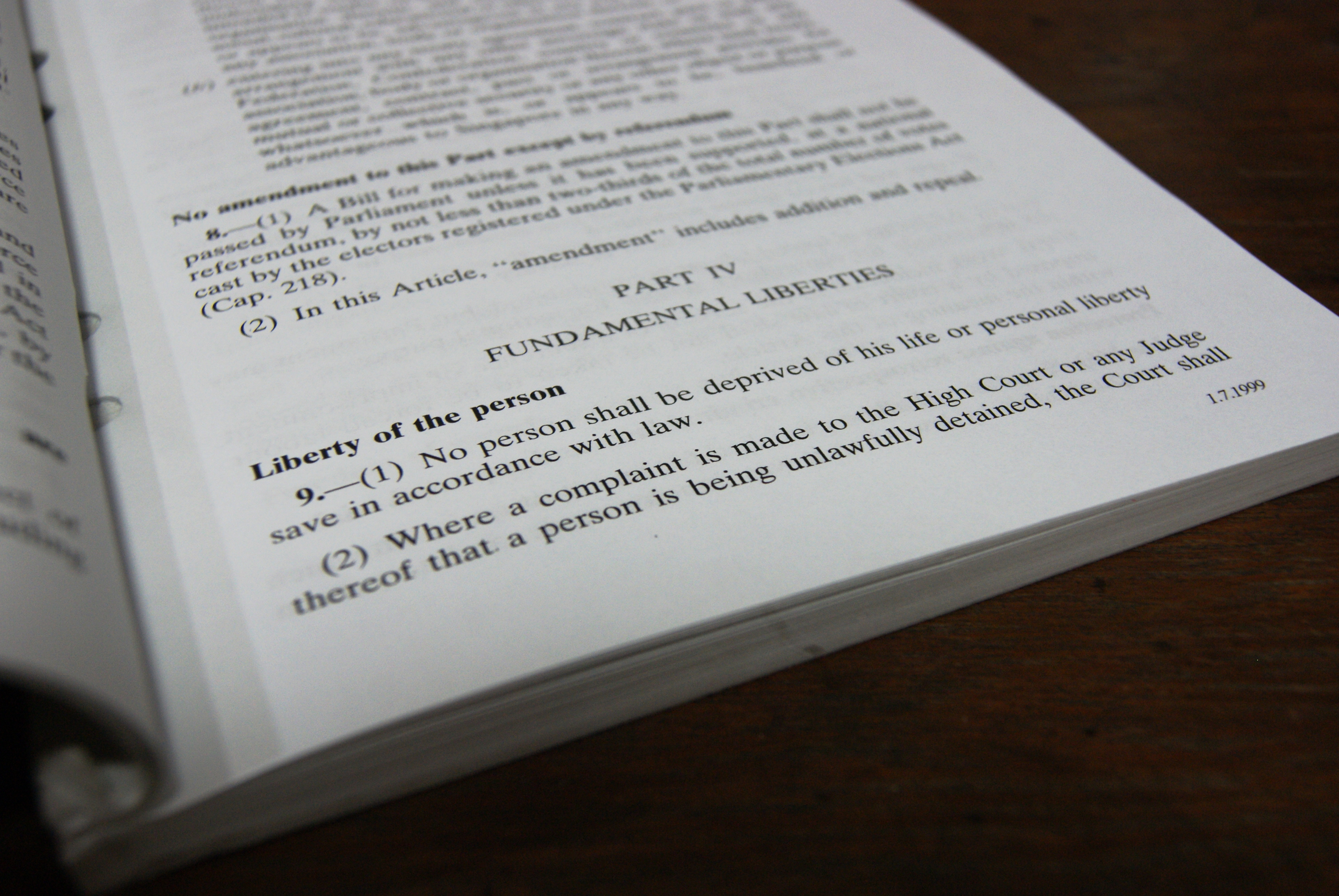
Article 9(1) in the 1999 Reprint of the Constitution of Singapore, which prohibits the deprivation of life or personal liberty save in accordance with law

The courts have not yet had the opportunity to define the term banishment in Article 13(1).

=== Meaning of Freedom of Movement ===
Lo Pui Sang v. Mamata Kapildev Dave (2008) took a narrow approach to the reading of personal liberty in Article 9(1). The High Court of Singapore held that personal liberty only refers to freedom from unlawful incarceration or detention, and does not include a liberty to contract. Although it was suggested this had always been the understanding of the term, no authority was cited.

=== Meaning of Subject to any law ===
Subject to any law relating to the security of Singapore or any part thereof, public order, public health or the punishment of offenders

==== Fundamental rules of natural justice ====
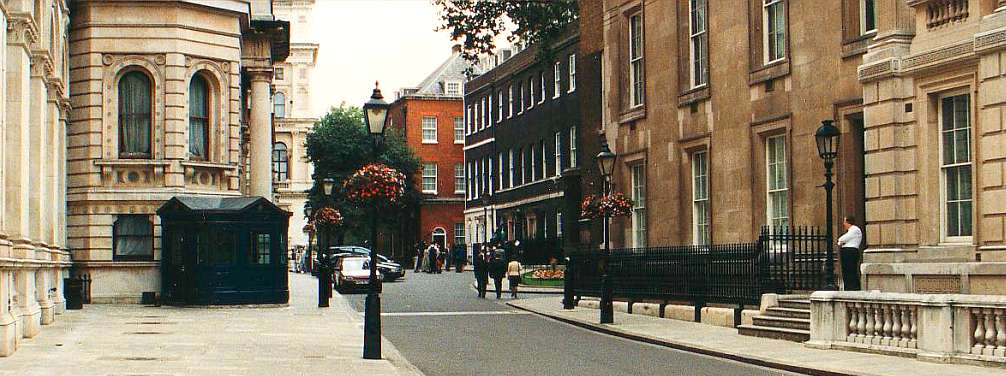
Up to October 2009, the Judicial Committee of the Privy Council met at Downing Street (pictured) in the Council Chamber. In a 1980 case on appeal from Singapore, the Privy Council held that the term law in provisions of the Singapore Constitution such as Article 9 included fundamental rules of natural justice.

In the Malaysian case Arumugam Pillai v. Government of Malaysia (1976), the Federal Court construed the phrase save in

===== Extent of natural justice =====
In Ong Ah Chuan and the subsequent decision Haw Tua Tau v. Public Prosecutor (19

===== A procedural or substantive concept? =====
Traditionally, at common law, natural justice is taken to be a procedural concept that embodies the twin pillars of audi alteram partem (hear the other party) and nemo iudex in causa sua (no one should be a judge in his or her own case.

==== Customary international law ====
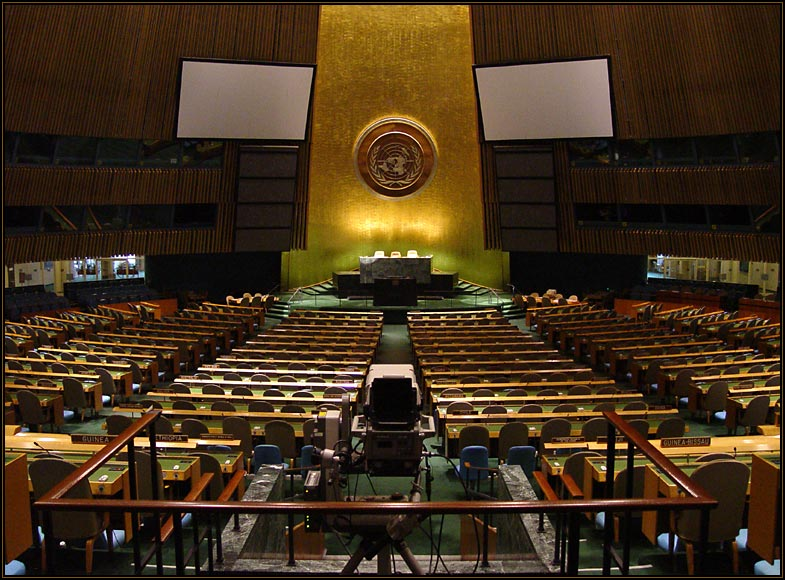
The United Nations General Assembly Hall in New York. The Singapore Court of Appeal acknowledged in a 2004 case that Article 5 of the Universal Declaration of Human Rights, adopted by the General Assembly in 1948, prohibits torture and cruel and inhumane treatment, and that this is considered customary international law. However, what constitutes "cruel and inhumane treatment" remains unclear.

== Application ==
=== Prohibition Against Banishment ===
==== Prohibition Against Banishment ====
This issue has yet to come before the Singapore courts.

=== Right to personal liberty ===
==== Rights of arrested persons ====
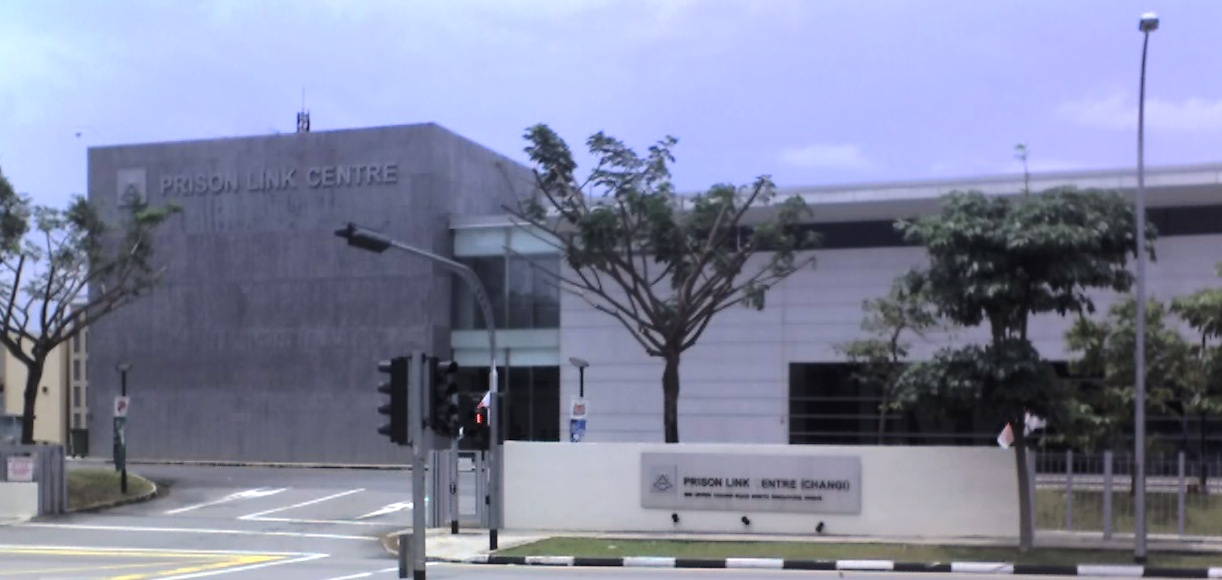
The Prison Link Centre, the gateway to the Changi Prison Complex. Article 9 provides that arrested persons have a right to challenge the legality of their detention, to be informed of the grounds of their arrest, to consult counsel, and to be produced before a magistrate within 48 hours of arrest.

Article 9(2) of the Constitution enshrines the right of persons who have been detained to apply to the High Court challenging the legality of their detention. The application is for an order for review of detention, which was formerly called a writ of habeas corpus. The Court is required to inquire into the complaint, and order the detainee to be produced before the Court and released unless it is satisfied that the detention is lawful.

Article 9(3) requires that an arrested person be informed "as soon as may be" of the grounds of his arrest. Article 9(4) goes on to provide that if the arrested person is not released he must, without unreasonable delay, and in any case within 48 hours (excluding the time of any necessary journey) be produced before a magistrate and cannot be further detained in custody without the authority of the magistrate. The person's attendance before the magistrate may be in person or by way of video-conferencing or other similar technology in accordance with law.

===== Right to counsel =====
Article 9(3) also states that an arrested person must be allowed to consult and be defended by a legal practitioner of his choice.

== Restrictions on the rights to life and personal liberty ==
As mentioned above, Parliament is entitled to restrict the rights to life and personal liberty as long as it acts "in accordance with law". More specific restrictions on Article 9 include Article 9(5), which provides that Articles 9(3) and (4) of the Constitution do not apply to enemy aliens or to persons arrested for contempt of Parliament pursuant to a warrant issued by the Speaker.

=== Detention under the Criminal Law (Temporary Provisions) Act and the Misuse of Drugs Act ===
Article 9(6) saves any law

(a) in force before the commencement of the Constitution authorizing the arrest and detention of any person in the interests of public safety, peace and good order; or
(b) relating to the misuse of drugs or intoxicating substances which authorizes the arrest and detention of any person for treatment and rehabilitation,

from being invalid because of inconsistency with Articles 9(3) and (4). This provision took effect on 10 March 1978 but was expressed to apply to laws in force prior to that date. Introduced by the Constitution (Amendment) Act 1978, the provision immunizes the Criminal Law (Temporary Provisions) Act and Part IV of the Misuse of Drugs Act from unconstitutionality.

Preventive detention is the use of executive power to detain individuals on the basis that they are predicted to commit future crimes that will threaten national interest. Among other things, the Criminal Law (Temporary Provisions) Act empowers the Minister for Home Affairs, if satisfied that a person has been associated with activities of a criminal nature, to order that he or she be detained for a period not exceeding 12 months if the Minister is of the view that the detention is necessary in the interests of public safety, peace and good order.

Under the Misuse of Drugs Act, the Director of the Central Narcotics Bureau may order drug addicts to undergo drug treatment or rehabilitation at an approved institution for renewable six-month periods up to a maximum of three years.

=== Detention under the Internal Security Act ===
Section 8(1) of Singapore's Internal Security Act ("ISA") gives the Minister for Home Affairs the power to detain a person without trial for any period not exceeding two years on the precondition that the President is: "satisfied ... that ... it is necessary to do so ... with a view to preventing that person from acting in any manner prejudicial to the security of Singapore ... or to the maintenance of public order or essential services therein". The period of detention may be renewed by the President indefinitely for periods not exceeding two years at a time as long as the grounds for detention continue to exist.

The ISA has its constitutional basis in Article 149 of the Constitution, which sanctions preventive detention and allows for laws passed by the legislature against subversion to override the Articles protecting the personal liberties of the individual. Specifically, Article 149(1) declares such legislation to be valid notwithstanding any inconsistency with five of the fundamental liberty provisions in the Constitution, including Article 9. Thus, detentions under the ISA cannot be challenged on the basis of deprivation of these rights.

== Notes ==
=== Cases ===
- Ong Ah Chuan v. Public Prosecutor (1980) UKPC 32, [1981] A.C. 648, [1979–1980] S.L.R.(R.) [Singapore Law Reports (Reissue)] 710, Privy Council (on appeal from Singapore).
- Haw Tua Tau v. Public Prosecutor (1981) UKPC 23, [1982] A.C. 136, [1981–1982] S.L.R.(R.) 133, P.C. (on appeal from Singapore).
- Tan Tek Seng v. Suruhanjaya Perkhidmatan Pendidikan [1996] 1 M.L.J. [Malaya Law Journal] 261, Court of Appeal (Malaysia).
- Washington v. Glucksberg 521 U.S. 702 (1997), Supreme Court (United States).
- Sugumar Balakrishnan v. Pengarah Imigresen Negeri Sabah [1998] 3 M.L.J. 289, C.A. (Malaysia).
- Nguyen Tuong Van v. Public Prosecutor (2004) SGCA 47, [2005] 1 S.L.R.(R.) 103, Court of Appeal (Singapore), archived from the original on 15 November 2010.
- Lee Kwan Woh v. Public Prosecutor [2009] 5 M.L.J. 301, Federal Court (Malaysia).
- Yong Vui Kong v. Public Prosecutor [2010] 3 S.L.R. [Singapore Law Reports] 489, C.A. (Singapore).

=== Legislation ===
- Criminal Law (Temporary Provisions) Act (Cap. 67, 2000 Rev. Ed.) ("CLTPA").
- Internal Security Act (Cap. 143, 1985 Rev. Ed.) ("ISA").
- Misuse of Drugs Act (Cap. 185, 2008 Rev. Ed.) ("MDA").
- Penal Code (Cap. 224, 2008 Rev. Ed.).

=== Other works ===
- Lim, C.L. (2005), "The Constitution and the Reception of Customary International Law: Nguyen Tuong Van v Public Prosecutor", Singapore Journal of Legal Studies, 1: 218–233, SSRN 952611.
- Thio, Li-ann (2010), "'It is a Little Known Legal Fact': Originalism, Customary Human Rights Law and Constitutional Interpretation: Yong Vui Kong v. Public Prosecutor", Singapore Journal of Legal Studies: 558–570, SSRN 1802666.
