= Land Acquisition Act 1966 =

Law on government acquisition of land

Parliament of Singapore
- Long title: An Act to provide for the acquisition of land for public and certain other specified purposes, the assessment of compensation to be made on account of such acquisition and for purposes connected therewith.
- Passed by: Parliament of Singapore
- Passed: October 26, 1966
- Commenced: June 17, 1967

Legislative history
- First reading: April 21, 1966
- Second reading: June 22, 1966
- Third reading: October 26, 1966

Summary
- Government acquisition of land for public purposes and assessment of compensation to those affected by said acquisition
- Status: Current legislation

The Land Acquisition Act 1966 is a Singaporean law on government acquisition of land for public housing projects.

== Background ==
Prior to the Land Acquisition Act 1966, the law for the government acquiring private land was the Land Acquisition Ordinance 1955, which empowered the government to compulsorily acquire private land for public projects. However, it did not prevent landowners from increasing the price of their land, which increased the land acquisition cost and therefore made low-cost public projects to be difficult.

In the 1950-60's, the population of Singapore was increasing, which caused informal settlements and shophouses to be overcrowded. This made the government to establish the country's public housing agency, the HDB, and to build HDB residential estates to relocate its population. However, in order to do so, land must be acquired cheaply. Land was also important as the government planned to use it for industrial development as well as to build roads, schools, and community and recreational facilities. To effectuate it, the Land Acquisition Act 1966 was introduced in parliament and was passed on October 26, 1966. It went into effect a year later on June 17.

== Impacts ==
After the commencement of the Land Acquisition Act, it expedited the government's land acquisition programme. In fact, between 1959 and 1984, the government acquired roughly a third of Singapore's land mass (43,713 acres).
