= Eng Foong Ho v Attorney-General =

Singapore legal judgement

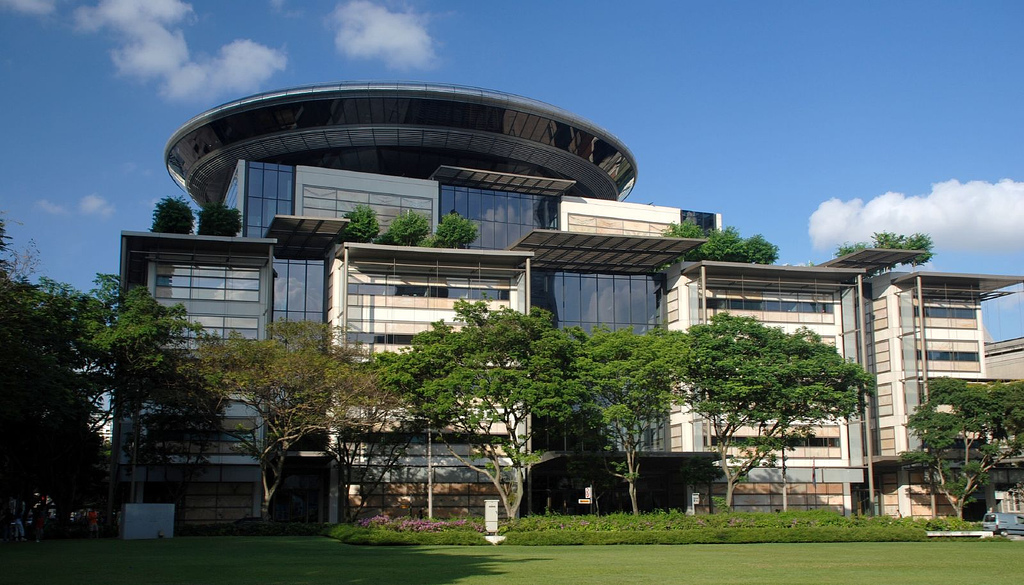
- The Supreme Court of Singapore, photographed in February 2007
- Court: High Court and Court of Appeal
- Full case name: Eng Foong Ho and others v Attorney-General
- Decided: 9 May 2008 (H.C.); 5 January 2009 (C.A.)
- Citations: [2008] SGHC 69, [2008] 3 S.L.R.(R.) 437, H.C.; [2009] SGCA 1, [2009] 2 S.L.R.(R.) 542, C.A.

Court membership
- Judges sitting: Tan Lee Meng J. (H.C.); Chan Sek Keong C.J., Andrew Phang Boon Leong and V.K. Rajah JJ. (C.A.)

Case opinions
- By compulsorily acquiring the property of a Chinese temple but not acquiring nearby lands owned by an Indian mission and a Christian church, the Collector of Land Revenue did not violate Article 12(1) of the Constitution, which guarantees equality before the law and equal protection of the law.

Eng Foong Ho v Attorney-General was a 2009 judgement of the Court of Appeal of Singapore, on appeal from a 2008 decision of the High Court. The main issue raised by the case was whether the Collector of Land Revenue had treated the plaintiffs (later appellants), who were devotees of the Jin Long Si Temple, unequally by compulsorily acquiring for public purposes the land on which the temple stood but not the lands of a Hindu mission and a Christian church nearby. It was alleged that the authorities had acted in violation of Article 12(1) of the Constitution of the Republic of Singapore, which guarantees the rights to equality before the law and equal protection of the law.

The High Court held that the plaintiffs lacked locus standi to bring the action as they were not the temple's legal owners. In any case, as there was evidence that the authorities had rational reasons for treating the temple property differently from the property of the Mission and the Church, the High Court found that there had been no breach of Article 12(1). Furthermore, the Court determined that the plaintiffs were guilty of inordinate delay in bringing the action.

On appeal, this decision was upheld in part by the Court of Appeal. The Court of Appeal found that the plaintiffs (appellants) had locus standi to bring the action as they were members of a Buddhist association, for whose benefit the temple property was held by its trustees. In addition, the Court found that the plaintiffs had not been guilty of inordinate delay in commencing the suit. However, the Court agreed with the trial judge that the Collector had not acted in violation of Article 12(1). In determining this issue, the Court held that the test to be applied is "whether there is a reasonable nexus between the state action taken and the object of the law". Such a nexus will be absent if the action amounts to "intentional and arbitrary discrimination" or intentional systematic discrimination. It is insufficient if any inequality is due to "inadvertence or inefficiency", unless this occurs on a very substantial scale. In addition, inequalities arising from a reasonable administrative policy or which are mere errors of judgement are insufficient to constitute a violation of Article 12(1).

== Background ==
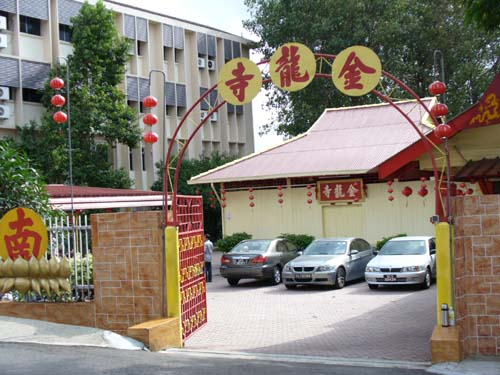
The Jin Long Si Temple, formerly at 61 Lorong A-Leng near Lorong How Sun in Singapore

The plaintiffs in this case were devotees of the Jin Long Si Temple, which was a temple in the Serangoon area of Singapore espousing Buddhist, Confucian and Taoist teachings. The temple property, which was located near the site of the Bartley Mass Rapid Transit (MRT) station, was compulsorily acquired pursuant to the Land Acquisition Act. The Government Gazette notification relating to the acquisition published on 20 January 2003 specified that the temple property (together with another piece of land nearby) had been acquired for the construction and comprehensive redevelopment of the Mass Rapid Transit's Circle Line.

The trustees of the temple property noted that the nearby Ramakrishna Mission ("the Mission") and the Bartley Christian Church ("the Church") were not similarly acquired, and proceeded to appeal against the acquisition through various avenues, including an appeal to the Prime Minister. Their attempts were unsuccessful.

== Lawsuit ==
Following the failure of the last appeal by the trustees of the temple, in January 2008 the plaintiffs filed an application in the High Court for a declaratory order against the compulsory acquisition. Their filing was based on Article 12(1) of the Constitution of Singapore, which reads: "All persons are equal before the law and entitled to the equal protection of the law." The filing alleged that the executive action of acquiring the temple land was discriminatory and in violation of Article 12(1).

== High Court judgement ==
=== Plaintiffs lack locus standi ===
The preliminary issue arising during the trial in the High Court was whether the plaintiffs had locus standi to commence the action. The plaintiffs claimed to have a strong emotional connection to the temple which gave them a "legitimate interest" in this issue. However, Justice Tan Lee Meng held that the plaintiffs, who were merely temple devotees, did not have the required locus standi to institute the proceedings, as opposed to the trustees of the temple who were its legal owners. He relied on the Court of Appeal's judgement in Karaha Bodas Co. LLC v. Pertamina Energy Trading Ltd. (2005), which stated that "to have the necessary standing, the plaintiff must be asserting the recognition of a 'right' that is personal to him". The Court also referred to Lord Diplock's judgement in Gouriet v. Union of Post Office Workers (1977) where he held that the courts should only be concerned with rights in so much as they are legal rights which are enforceable by one party against another.

The High Court rejected the plaintiffs' argument that, by compulsorily acquiring a temple, the Government was limiting a person's right under Article 15(1) of the Constitution to profess, practice and propagate his or her religion, and that this in turn gave him or her the legal right to commence an action on the ground that where an individual's constitutional rights are affected, he or she has a sufficient interest to ensure that his or her rights are protected. The court ruling held that this land acquisition matter was not in any way related to religious freedom. Because the acquisition was not related to religious freedom, the High Court found that only the trustees who were the legal owners of the temple property had the requisite locus standi to institute proceedings if they deemed their rights to have been infringed.

=== Article 12(1) of the Constitution not violated ===
In his ruling, Justice Tan cited Ong Ah Chuan v. Public Prosecutor (1980) for the proposition that "[e]quality before the law and equal protection of the law require that like should be compared with like. What Article 12(1) of the Constitution assures to the individual is the right to equal treatment with other individuals in similar circumstances." He noted that the plaintiffs had made it clear that they were not alleging bad faith on the part of the authorities in acquiring the temple land; rather, that they asserted there were no rational reasons for treating the temple property differently from that of the Mission and the Church.

However, the judge regarded this as an "unsubstantiated allegation". According to a notification published in the Government Gazette, the temple property had been acquired for comprehensive redevelopment of the site. Under section 5(3) of the Land Acquisition Act, the notification was conclusive evidence that the property was required for that purpose. The judge accepted evidence tendered by the Attorney-General that the property of the Church and the Mission had not been compulsorily acquired because they were unsuitable for redevelopment. As no state land adjoined the Church property or the surrounding lands, there was no reasonable opportunity for amalgamating the Church property with existing state land. As for the Mission property, the three main buildings on it had been under study for conservation since 2002, and were gazetted for conservation in 2006. There was "ample evidence" that, where necessary, the Government had acquired for public purposes properties zoned as places of worship.

Although one of the plaintiffs' witnesses, a chartered land surveyor, had suggested that the authorities could redevelop the land in a different manner, he did not state that the authorities' redevelopment plan was wrong or indefensible. The court was not in a position to decide which plans for redeveloping areas in Singapore were better. Thus, the acquisition of the temple property had not infringed Article 12(1) of the Constitution.

=== Inordinate delay ===
The Court found that, in any case, the plaintiffs had inordinately delayed commencing an action. The Court noted that the notice to acquire the land had been gazetted on 20 January 2003, more than five years before the High Court decision. Tan rejected the plaintiffs' argument that they were not guilty of delay since it was only in November 2007 that they learned that the authorities would not be reversing their decision. In his view, the fact that the decision would not be reversed was "made plain long ago".

== Court of Appeal judgement ==
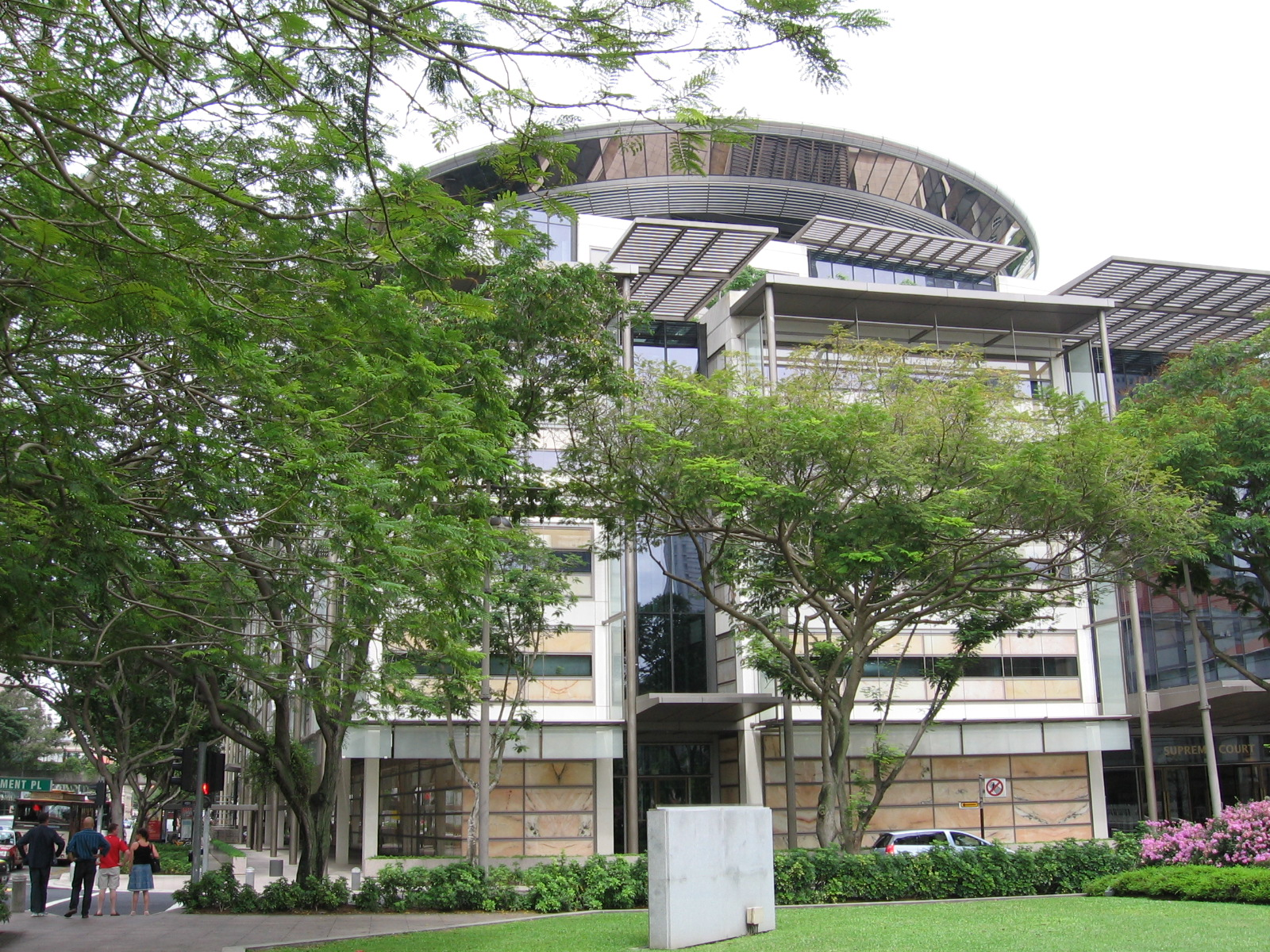
The Supreme Court of Singapore, photographed in December 2005, where the appeal in Eng Foong Ho v. Attorney-General was heard by the Court of Appeal

On appeal to the Court of Appeal, three issues were raised. The first issue was whether the plaintiffs (appellants) had the requisite locus standi. The second was whether there had been an inordinate delay on the appellants' part in pursuing the matter in court. The third issue is the most significant, namely, whether the acquisition of the temple property violated Article 12(1) of the Constitution.

=== Plaintiffs have locus standi ===
The Court of Appeal disagreed with the trial judge's finding with regard to locus standi. Judge of Appeal Andrew Phang, delivering the Court's judgement, opined that since according to the land register the temple was held in trust for San Jiao Sheng Tang Buddhist Association, of which the devotees were members, they had the requisite locus standi to bring the issue before the court.

Eng Foong Ho was subsequently cited in Tan Eng Hong v. Attorney-General (2011) in support of the proposition that in order for a person to have locus standi to launch a constitutional claim, he or she must allege a violation of his or her own constitutional rights – that is, a "substantial interest" – rather than satisfy a lower "sufficient interest" test.

=== No inordinate delay ===
The Court of Appeal also held that although there had prima facie been a delay, the appellants at the time had believed that the trustees and the authorities were engaged in settlement discussions that might lead to resolution of the dispute. In those circumstances, the Court opined that there had not been an inordinate delay by the appellants in starting their lawsuit. Furthermore, the Court opined on an obiter basis that, in any case, a "delay in asserting one's constitutional rights may not always be a relevant factor unless the State has been irreparably prejudiced by the assertion of such rights".

=== No violation of Article 12(1) ===
==== Modified rational nexus test ====
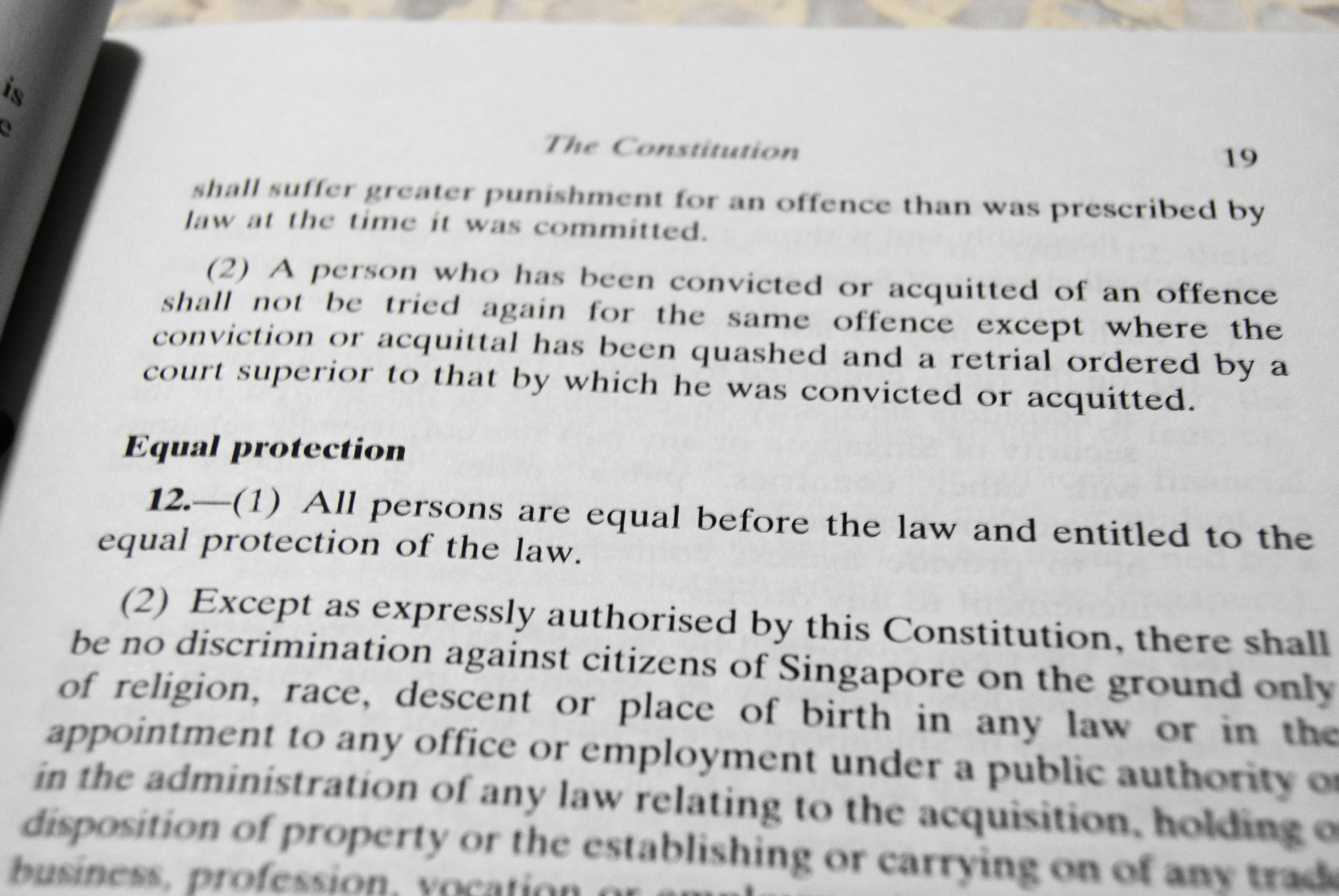
Article 12 in the 1999 Reprint of the Constitution of Singapore

In its ruling, the Court of Appeal cited Ong Ah Chuan, wherein Lord Diplock held that Article 12(1), which sets out the principle of equality before the law and equal protection of the law, "prohibits laws which require that some individuals within a single class should be treated by way of punishment more harshly than others". In essence, persons belonging to the same class should be treated in the same manner. Bearing in mind the separation of powers, Lord Diplock was of the opinion that it was up to the legislature to decide the differentia distinguishing different classes of individuals. If the factor which the legislature adopts as constituting the dissimilarity in circumstances is not purely arbitrary but bears a reasonable relation to the social object of the law, there is no inconsistency with Article 12(1) of the Constitution.

This concept was more fully expounded in Public Prosecutor v. Taw Cheng Kong (1998), in which the Court of Appeal reasoned that since the object of Article 12(1) is to guard against various forms of arbitrariness, the test to be applied is to ask if the law treats different classes of persons differently. If it does, then the court must ask whether the differential treatment is based on intelligible differentia. The court must then go on to consider whether the basis of differential treatment bears a reasonable relation or nexus to the object of the law.

In Eng Foong Ho, the Court of Appeal noted that it was not necessary to discuss the principle of reasonable classification of laws which was the subject of Taw Cheng Kong, since the appellants had not challenged the constitutionality of the Land Acquisition Act. In the present case, the appellants were challenging the application rather than the validity of the Act. The Court therefore applied a modified form of the Taw Cheng Kong rational nexus test, holding that "[t]he question is whether there is a reasonable nexus between the state action and the objective to be achieved by the law". The Court opinion relied on the principles set out in the Privy Council cases Howe Yoon Chong v. Chief Assessor (1980) and Howe Yoon Chong v. Chief Assessor (1990). These cases involved alleged inequality in property valuation for the purpose of determining property tax. The significance of the two Howe Yoon Chong cases is that they prescribed limits as to what constitutes inequality. Several salient points were drawn from the cases in Eng Foong Ho:

- An executive act may be unconstitutional if it amounts to "intentional and arbitrary discrimination". Thus, an intentional systematic undervaluation of property would breach Article 12(1) of the Constitution, though "something less might perhaps suffice".
- However, absolute equality is not attainable and inequalities arising from "the application of a reasonable administrative policy" or "mere errors of judgment" are not sufficient to constitute a violation of Article 12(1). Inequalities due to "inadvertence or inefficiency" need to be on "a very substantial scale" to violate the Article.

Thio Li-ann has noted that it is not clear whether the Court of Appeal was laying down "intentional and arbitrary discrimination" as the sole test for whether executive acts comply with Article 12(1) of the Constitution, or whether it is only one possible test and that executive acts can also be challenged if they fail a reasonable classification test. This is because "[a]rbitrariness implies the lack of any rationality", and it is much harder for a plaintiff to prove that executive action is irrational than to show that there is no reasonable classification in the action.

==== Application of law to the facts ====
On the facts, Justice Phang remarked in his opinion that the appellants had not alleged any arbitrary action by the Government in compulsorily acquiring the temple property, and had in fact conceded that the acquisition had been proceeded with in good faith. Thus, the judge noted that "it is not clear where the discrimination lies other than in the consequential fact that the properties of the Mission and the Church were not acquired but that of the Temple was". The Attorney-General (respondent) presented the following evidence:

- The Government had a long-standing policy of optimizing land use around MRT stations, and the amalgamation of the state land adjoining the temple property provided an opportunity to realize significant development potential of the land.
- In contrast, there was no state land adjoining the Church. It was surrounded by a low density housing area and thus did not provide the same developmental potential as the temple property.
- The Mission site had been under study for conservation since 2002. The three main buildings on the site were eventually gazetted for conservation in 2006, and hence the site was inappropriate for acquisition. Although the appellant had argued that a football field on the Mission site should have been acquired instead of the temple property, the three main buildings were functionally integrated and acquisition of part of the Mission site would have resulted in a plot of state land that was highly irregular in shape. In any case, the appellant's argument did not relate to proper land use planning.

In essence, the Court found that the decision of the Collector of Land Revenue was "based solely on planning considerations". This finding satisfied the rational nexus test, and thus it was clear that Article 12(1) of the Constitution had not been violated.

Justice Phang also held that section 5(3) of the Land Acquisition Act was not necessarily determinative of the matter in the Collector's favour, as acquisitions can be challenged for having been made in bad faith. However, the provision applied in this case as no bad faith on the Collector's part had been alleged by the appellants.
