= Ong Ah Chuan v Public Prosecutor =

Landmark decision in 1980 from Singapore

- Court: Judicial Committee of the Privy Council
- Full case name: Ong Ah Chuan and another v. Public Prosecutor
- Decided: 15 October 1980
- Citations: [1980] UKPC 32, [1981] A.C. 648, [1981] 1 M.L.J. 64, [1979–1980] S.L.R.(R.) 710

Case history
- Prior actions: [1977–1978] S.L.R.(R.) 417, H.C. (Singapore) [1979–1980] S.L.R.(R.) 53, C.C.A. (Singapore)

Court membership
- Judges sitting: Lord Diplock, Lord Keith of Kinkel, Lord Scarman and Lord Roskill.

Case opinions
- Provisions in the Misuse of Drugs Act 1973 (No. 5 of 1973) creating a rebuttable presumption of drug trafficking and imposing a mandatory death penalty for certain trafficking offences do not violate Article 9(1) or Article 12(1) of the Constitution of Singapore.

Ong Ah Chuan v Public Prosecutor is a landmark decision delivered in 1980 by the Judicial Committee of the Privy Council on appeal from Singapore which deals with the constitutionality of section 15 of the Misuse of Drugs Act 1973 (No. 5 of 1973) (now section 17 of the Misuse of Drugs Act (Cap. 185, 2008 Rev. Ed.)) ("MDA"), and the mandatory death penalty by the Act for certain offences. The appellants contended that the presumption of trafficking under section 15 of the MDA violated Article 9(1) of the Constitution of the Republic of Singapore (1980 Reprint) (now the Singapore Constitution (1985 Rev. Ed., 1999 Reprint)) and that the mandatory death penalty was arbitrary and violated Article 12(1) of the Constitution.

Dismissing the appeal, the Privy Council clarified several issues of Singapore law. It explained that the word law in Article 9(1) includes fundamental rules of natural justice. The court also held that Article 12(1) does not prohibit differentiation between classes of people, but requires that like should be compared with like. It also laid out the "reasonable relation" test to determine if legislation is in breach of Article 12(1).

Ong Ah Chuan has been referred to in subsequent cases. In some of them, attempts have been made to argue that certain legal principles are fundamental rules of natural justice, and thus constitutionally protected by Article 9(1). There has also been academic discussion concerning whether fundamental rules of natural justice enable the courts to examine the substantive fairness or reasonableness of laws. The ruling in Ong Ah Chuan that the mandatory death penalty is constitutional has not been followed in later Privy Council decisions. These cases were distinguished by the Singapore Court of Appeal in Yong Vui Kong v. Public Prosecutor (2010) on the basis that the constitutions involved in those cases contained express prohibitions against inhuman or degrading punishment or treatment, which the Singapore Constitution lacks.

The reasonable relation test applied to Article 12(1) by the Privy Council has been applied in a number of local and foreign cases. It was reformulated into a three-stage test by the Court of Appeal in Public Prosecutor v. Taw Cheng Kong (1998). The Court applied a modified version of the test to situations involving the discriminatory application of neutral laws in Eng Foong Ho v. Attorney-General (2009), and expressed the view that Article 12(1) would only be infringed in such cases where there was intentional and arbitrary discrimination, or inequalities due to inadvertence or inefficiency on a very substantial scale. The element of arbitrariness was also mentioned by the Court in Chng Suan Tze v. Minister for Home Affairs (1988) – it said a law that allows a public authority to exercise arbitrary discretionary power is in violation of Article 12(1).

== Facts ==
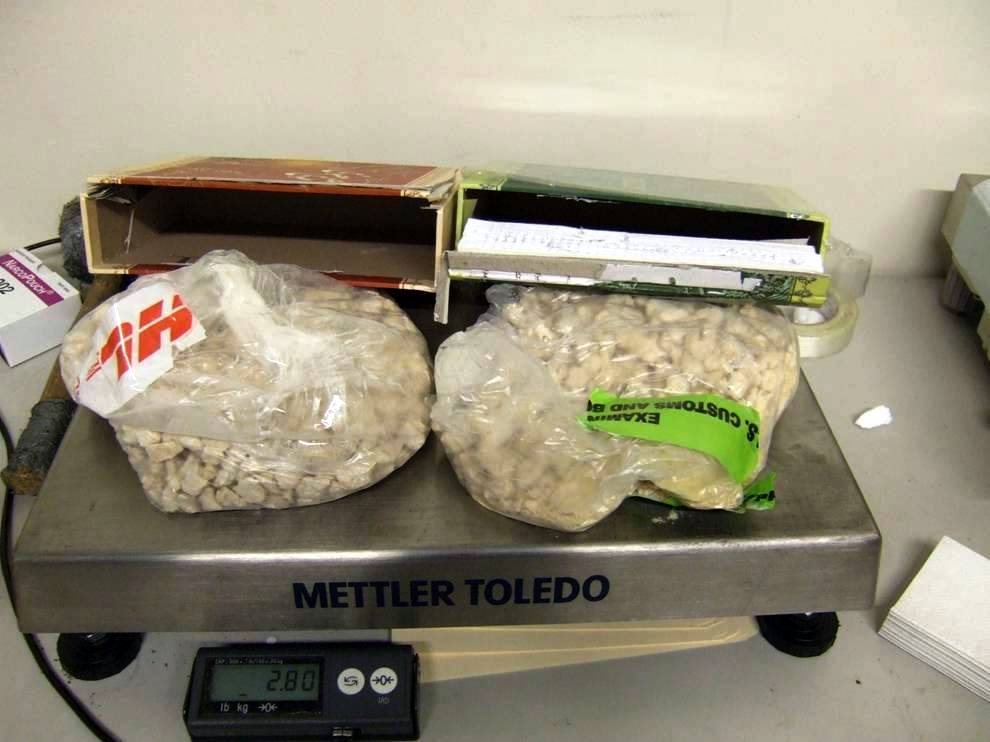
Heroin found hidden inside hollow books for trafficking purposes

The case involved an appeal by two appellants, Ong Ah Chuan (王亚泉 Wáng Yàquán) and Koh Chai Cheng, to the Judicial Committee of the Privy Council – then Singapore's final appellate court – against their separate convictions under section 3 of the Misuse of Drugs Act 1973 ("MDA"). by the High Court of Singapore, which were upheld by the Court of Criminal Appeal.

Ong Ah Chuan was charged for trafficking 209.84 grams (7.402 oz) of heroin. Two narcotics officers witnessed the appellant putting a plastic bag into his car and followed him. The appellant drove to Bukit Timah Road, where he was arrested by the officers. The officers searched the appellant's car and found the heroin in his car. Koh Chai Cheng was charged for trafficking 1,256 grams (44.3 oz) of heroin. The appellant brought the heroin into Singapore from Malaysia in order to sell it to a buyer, who was actually a police informer. The appellant was arrested when he was about to drive away from the meeting place and the heroin was discovered in the boot of his car.

== Procedural history ==
Before the High Court, counsel for Ong submitted that since the accused had been carrying the drugs for personal purposes and not for the purposes of delivery or sale, the actions did not amount to trafficking within the meaning of the MDA. The accused also claimed that he had purchased the large quantity of heroin because it was cheaper and more convenient to buy it in bulk. The trial judges dismissed the defence and found that the accused had invented the story "to escape the consequences of his criminal act". Having found that the accused had been transporting the drugs, his act fell under the definition of traffic in the Act. He was convicted for trafficking heroin and sentenced to death.

In Koh Chai Cheng's case, he denied knowledge of the drugs and contended that they had been planted in the boot of his car by police informers after he had arrived in Singapore. The trial judges rejected the argument, and the accused was accordingly convicted.

Both Ong Ah Chuan and Koh Chai Cheng appealed to the Court of Criminal Appeal, which upheld the convictions and sentences. They sought and obtained leave to appeal to the Privy Council against the constitutionality of sections 15 and 29 of the MDA. Section 15 created a rebuttable presumption that if a person was in possession of an amount of drugs exceeding the minimum quantities specified in the section, the possession was for trafficking purposes. The effect of section 29 and the Second Schedule of the Act was to impose the mandatory death penalty for trafficking above a certain quantity of drugs.

== Legal issues on appeal ==
Three issues were raised by counsel for the appellants when the case went before the Privy Council:

1. Whether the Court of Criminal Appeal was wrong in construing the presumption of trafficking under section 15 of the MDA.
2. Even if the presumption of trafficking under section 15 of the MDA was validly construed, whether the presumption was not "in accordance with law" as set out in Article 9(1) of the Constitution of Singapore, and was thus unconstitutional.
3. Whether the mandatory nature of capital punishment, for offences as broadly drawn as that of trafficking created by section 3 of the MDA, was unconstitutional. In addressing this issue, two sub-issues were raised. The first was whether mandatory capital punishment was "in accordance with law" as set out in Article 9(1). The second was whether the mandatory nature of capital punishment was unconstitutional because it contravened Article 12(1) of the Singapore Constitution.

== Decision of the court ==
=== Presumption of trafficking ===
The appellants' first submission was that the Court of Criminal Appeal had erred in deciding that the drugs found in the possession of the accused persons had been for trafficking purposes under section 15 of the MDA. This argument was rejected by the Privy Council.

The Privy Council's decision was delivered by Lord Diplock on 15 October 1980. His Lordship held that in Singapore, the offences of drug possession and drug trafficking are distinct from each other. Drug trafficking was an offence under section 3 of the MDA. Drug possession, on the other hand, was an offence under section 6 of the MDA. The cases of Poon Soh Har v. Public Prosecutor (1977) and Seow Koon Guan v. Public Prosecutor (1978) were cited as evidence of Singapore courts upholding this distinction. Where the accused was found to be transporting controlled drugs, it was held that the transporter's purpose would determine whether the offence was one of drug possession or drug trafficking. Trafficking entailed the moving of drugs for the purpose of transferring possession from the mover to some other person, whether this purpose was achieved or not.

It was observed by the Privy Council that section 15 of the MDA assigned various quantity levels to certain controlled drugs, such as 2 grams (0.071 oz) for heroin. On securing proof that an accused possessed more than 2 grams of heroin, the courts could adopt a rebuttable presumption that such possession was for trafficking purposes, pursuant to section 3 of the MDA. It would be for the accused to rebut the presumption by proving that the possession of drugs above the limits set out under section 15 was not for trafficking purposes. Acquittal from the offence of drug trafficking could be secured if the accused could prove that the conveying of the drugs from one place to another was for the purpose of personal consumption.

Lord Diplock explained that the rationale for the section 15 presumption was the difficulty in proving the purpose of trafficking. In drug trafficking cases, the strongest attainable evidence was likely to be the act of transporting the drugs. Regardless of this, his Lordship held that even in the absence of section 15, it could be inferred that the transportation of a large quantity of drugs was for trafficking purposes. As a matter of common sense, the larger the quantity, the more likely it is for trafficking. Therefore, the appellants' argument that the Court of Criminal Appeal had erred in construing the presumption created by section 15(2) of the MDA was rejected.

=== Article 9(1) of the Constitution ===
The second argument of the counsel for the appellants was that even if the Court of Criminal Appeal had not erred in construing the presumption in section 15 of the MDA, the presumption was inconsistent with Article 9(1) of the Constitution.

==== Interpreting the Constitution ====
In addressing this argument, Lord Diplock first clarified how the Constitution should be interpreted. Referring to the judgment by Lord Wilberforce in Minister of Home Affairs v. Fisher (1979), he affirmed that a constitution on the Westminster model should be interpreted not as an Act of Parliament, but as "sui generis, calling for principles of interpretation of its own, suitable to its character". He also held that fundamental liberties in Part IV of the Constitution should be given a "generous interpretation" so as to give individuals the full measure of the liberties referred to.

Article 9(1) of the Constitution states: "No person shall be deprived of his life or personal liberty save in accordance with law." Counsel for the Public Prosecutor argued that the word law in Article 9(1) included written law. Since Article 2(1) defined written law included all Acts in force in Singapore, all Acts which were validly passed by Parliament would be consistent with Article 9(1) even if they deprived a person of life or personal liberty. Being Acts in force in Singapore, they were "in accordance with the law".

The Privy Council rejected such an approach to interpreting the term "in accordance with law". Citing Article 4, which declares the Constitution to be the supreme law of Singapore and states that laws enacted by the Legislature which are inconsistent with the Constitution are void, the court maintained it had the duty to determine whether any Act of Parliament was inconsistent with the Constitution and thus void. A law that is void will not be in force in Singapore, and consequently, will not be grounds for depriving a person of his life or personal liberty under Article 9(1).

==== Fundamental rules of natural justice ====
In line with the generous approach that should be taken when engaging in constitutional interpretation, the Privy Council interpreted the meaning of law in contexts such as the term "in accordance with law" as in Article 9(1) to refer to a system of law incorporating fundamental rules of natural justice. This interpretation was, in the court's view, justified, as "[i]t would have been taken for granted by the makers of the Constitution that the 'law' to which citizens could have recourse for the protection of fundamental liberties assured to them by the Constitution would be a system of law that did not flout those fundamental rules".

Elaborating, Lord Diplock stated that one of the fundamental rules of natural justice in the field of criminal law is that a person should not be punished for an offence unless it has been established to the satisfaction of an independent and unbiased tribunal that he committed it. This requires that there be material before the court logically probative of facts sufficient to constitute the offence.

The Privy Council then considered whether the presumption of trafficking under section 15 of the MDA was inconsistent with the Constitution. The appellants had argued that the presumption was inconsistent with the presumption of innocence, which was part of Singapore law by virtue of Article 9(1) of the Constitution.

Lord Diplock rejected this argument, and instead upheld the validity of a presumption of trafficking where possession of a quantity of prohibited drugs higher than the minimum specified in section 15 of the MDA has been proved. Where the difference between an offence and some lesser offence was the particular purpose with which that unlawful act was committed, there was nothing unfair about requiring the accused to prove his actual purpose. This was because the accused alone is armed with the knowledge of the purpose of the illegal act.

The section 15 presumption of trafficking was also held to be in accordance with law for the following reasons:

- This sort of presumption was a common feature in modern legislation.
- The presumption of trafficking itself arose from an already illegal act of possession, and thus no wholly innocent explanation of the purpose for which the drug was transported was possible.
- The quantity specified in section 15 was many times greater than the daily dose consumed by drug addicts, fortifying the likelihood of trafficking.

Since the presumption in section 15 was rebuttable, it did not conflict with any fundamental rule of natural justice, and was logically probative of facts sufficient to constitute the offence. The presumption of trafficking was thus held to be consistent with Article 9(1) of the Constitution.

==== Mandatory death penalty ====
The appellants' contention concerning the mandatory death penalty, as understood by the Privy Council, was that the punishment was not in accordance with law within the meaning of Article 9(1) because the offence was so broadly drawn that it prevented the court from punishing offenders according to their individual blameworthiness.

The Privy Council clarified that it was for the Legislature of Singapore to decide whether there should be capital punishment in Singapore, and what offences should warrant capital punishment. It added that there was nothing unusual in a capital sentence being mandatory as its efficacy as a deterrent may diminish to some extent if it is not mandatory. At common law all capital sentences were mandatory, and this is still so for murder and offences against the President's person under the Penal Code.

The court also mentioned in passing that contending the constitutionality of capital punishment was foreclosed by the recognition in Article 9(1) that a person may be deprived of life in accordance with law.

=== Article 12(1) of the Constitution ===
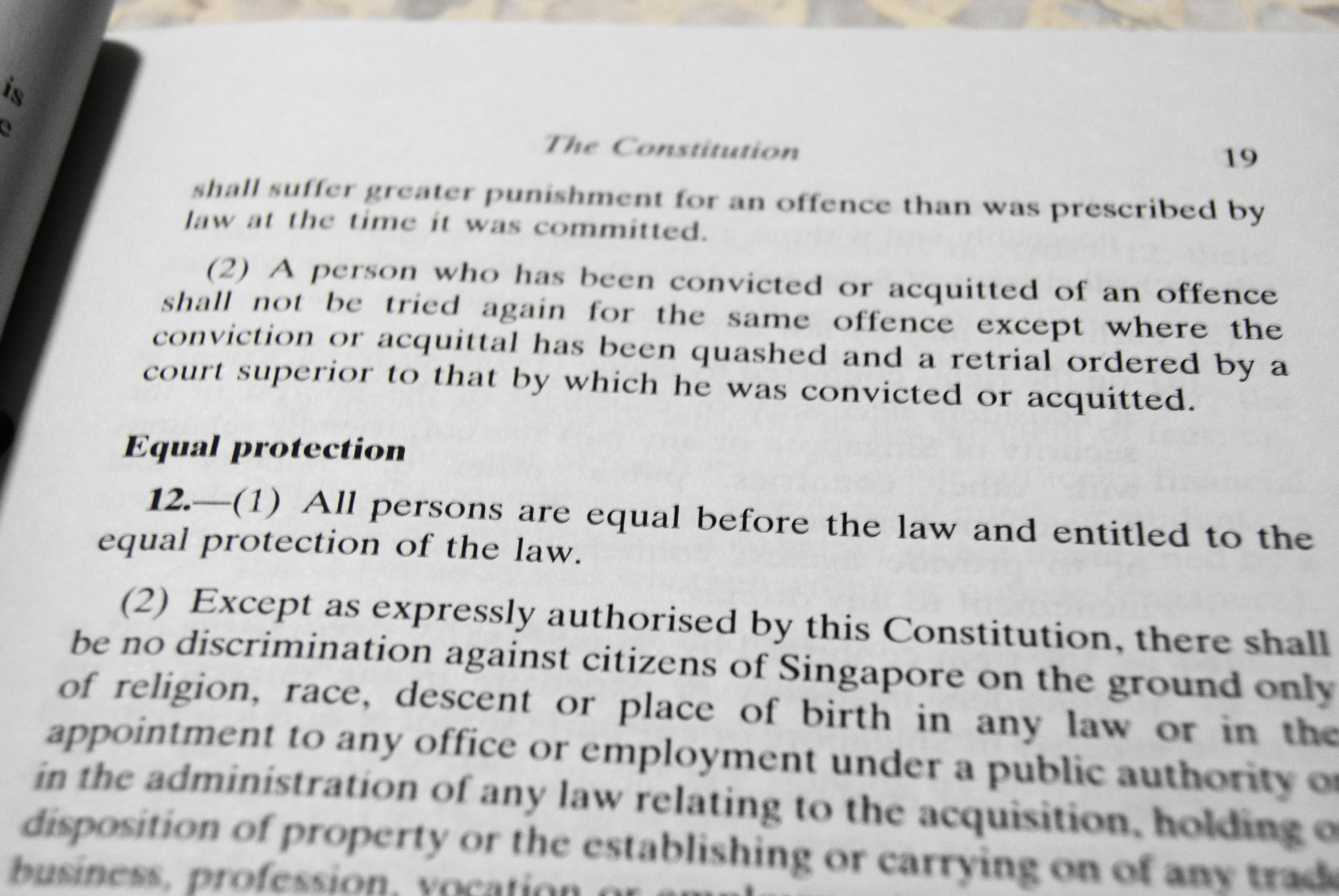
Article 12 of the Constitution of Singapore (1985 Revised Edition, 1999 Reprint)

Counsel for the appellants contended that the mandatory nature of capital punishment imposed by the MDA forbids the court from imposing punishment on offenders according to their "individual blameworthiness". This contravened the principle of equality before the law stated in Article 12(1) of the Constitution because it forced the court to prescribe the highest penalty of death to an addict who supplies to a friend 15 grams (0.53 oz) of heroin, and to mete out a less severe punishment for a drug dealer who sells to others a total of 14.99 grams (0.529 oz) of heroin.

Article 12(1) states: "All persons are equal before the law and entitled to the equal protection of the law." The Privy Council explained that the Article provides for all like persons to be treated alike, and prohibits laws that impose different punishments for individuals within the same class. However, the equality provision does not forbid discrimination in prescribing different punishments for different classes of individuals. These classes are differentiated by the circumstances of the offence committed. Such differentiation is consistent with Article 12(1) as long as the element that the Legislature adopts as the differentiating factor is not entirely arbitrary but bears a "reasonable relation to the social object of the law".

Applying this reasonable relation test to the case, the Privy Council held that the mandatory death penalty was consistent with Article 12(1). This was because a reasonable relation exists between the social objective of the MDA and the differentiating factor – the quantity of drug involved in the offence. The objective of the MDA is to control the illicit drug trade, especially with regard to drugs that are highly addictive. This creates a social evil – one that the MDA seeks to prevent – which is said to be "broadly proportional to the quantity of addictive drugs" brought into the market. This accordingly justifies the severe punishment of the mandatory death penalty as it serves as a form of deterrence. In addition, Lord Diplock expressed the opinion that the appropriate boundary to be drawn between varying classes of persons is a question best left to the Legislature. He declined to comment on whether differences in circumstances justified the imposition of different punishments. Rather, the doctrine of separation of powers indicated that such "questions of social policy" are not within the purview of the judiciary. Since the appellants could not show that the differentiation amongst offenders on the basis of the quantity of the drug was arbitrary, the appeal on this ground was dismissed.

== Execution of Ong Ah Chuan ==
After the Privy Council dismissed his appeal, Ong Ah Chuan was eventually hanged on 20 February 1981 at Singapore's Changi Prison for his crime after his appeal to President of Singapore Benjamin Sheares for clemency was declined. Ong was 27 years old at the time of his execution, and he became the seventh drug offender to be hanged in Singapore since the 1975 legal introduction of the mandatory death sentence for drug trafficking.

Koh Chai Cheng, the other appellant in Ong's appeal, was also hanged on 27 March 1981.

== Subsequent legal developments and academic opinions ==
=== Article 9(1) ===
==== Regarding fundamental rules of natural justice ====
In the Privy Council case Haw Tua Tau v. Public Prosecutor (1981), the appellants criticised amendments to the Criminal Procedure Code ("CPC") that removed an accused person's right to make an unsworn statement not subject to cross-examination, and replaced it with a power exercisable by the court to draw an adverse inference if the accused person opts to remain silent after being warned about the possible consequences of doing so. They submitted that the changes violated the privilege against self-incrimination which was a fundamental rule of natural justice. Lord Diplock, speaking for the court, questioned if the right to silence is a fundamental rule of natural justice but found it unnecessary to decide this point as he held that the new CPC provisions provided an accused person with an inducement to testify but did not compel him or her to do so. In reaching this conclusion, the judge noted that "[i]n considering whether a particular practice adopted by a court of law offends against a fundamental rule of natural justice, that practice must not be looked at in isolation but in light of the part which it plays in the complete judicial process", and that "what may properly be regarded by lawyers as rules of natural justice change with the times".

In Public Prosecutor v. Mazlan bin Maidun (1992), the Court of Appeal held that the right to silence is related largely to the giving of evidence, and that there is no constitutional or statutory provision in Singapore protecting it. As such, to say it is a constitutional right in the form of a fundamental rule of natural justice would be to "elevate an evidential rule to constitutional status" despite the lack of "explicit provision" in the Constitution. This, in the opinion of the Court, required "a degree of adventurous extrapolation" in the interpretation of Article 9(1) which the Court did not consider justified.

Victor V. Ramraj has suggested that there are four models of due process: the formal model, procedural model, procedural-privacy model, and full substantive model. Substantive due process, represented by the full substantive model, is concerned with the content or subject matter of a law. Procedural due process, its extreme form represented by the formal model, deals with the manner which a law, administrative justice or judicial task is carried out.

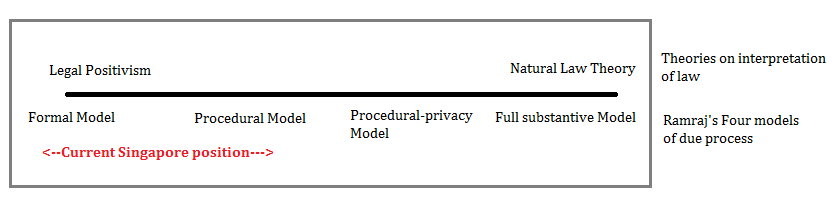
The models of due process evidenced by the Singapore courts' interpretation of the word law in Article 9(1) of the Constitution, based on work by Victor Ramraj

Natural justice principles originated from the procedural elements of due process, but it is uncertain if substantive elements of due process are accepted in local law yet. Ong Ah Chuan is said to adopt the idea of procedural fairness. In the procedural model, courts go beyond a mere assessment of formal validity and inquire into the procedural fairness of legal processes. In Singapore, the current legal position is somewhere between the formal model as evidenced by the case of Jabar bin Kadermastan v. Public Prosecutor (1995), and the procedural model evidenced by Ong Ah Chuan. In Jabar, the Court of Appeal held that a law is valid and binding as long as it has been validly passed by Parliament. Consequently, whether the law is fair, just and reasonable does not matter.

Lim Chin Leng has opined that to accord principles of natural justice an elevated constitutional status may cause it to override statutes, which might contradict the Constitution which vests the law making power in the legislature. Similarly, Andrew J. Harding disagrees with the idea of "substantive natural justice" because, in his view, it cannot be shown that it was the Privy Council's intent to apply natural justice in a substantive sense, since this would mean that the court can strike down a provision for inconsistency with natural justice even if it satisfies the rational nexus test under Article 12(1) of the Constitution. It will also be hard to ascertain the limits of judicial power. However, the view has been expressed that such judicial activism would merely be the judiciary exercising its proper role. Furthermore, a judicial inquiry arguably involves both substantive and procedural aspects, so both concepts require no differentiation.

Despite these academic opinions, at present the Singapore courts are still deferential to the exercise of Parliament's legislative powers and adopt a respectful attitude towards its pronouncements. In Lo Pui Sang v. Mamata Kapildev Dave (2008), it was held that the words save in accordance with law in Article 9(1) of the Constitution "incline liberally in favour of legislative power, but the clear words cannot be altered by the court". On the facts, assuming that the appellants had been deprived of personal liberty pursuant to certain statutory provisions, this had been carried out in accordance with law and thus was not unconstitutional.

==== Regarding the mandatory death penalty ====
In Ong Ah Chuan, the Privy Council held that the argument that capital punishment is unconstitutional is foreclosed by Article 9(1) of the Constitution itself because it clearly states that a person can be deprived of his life "in accordance with law". The court further noted that "[t]here is nothing unusual in a capital sentence being mandatory" since at common law all capital sentences were mandatory, and that if a capital sentence was discretionary this might reduce its deterrent effect. Also, the prerogative of mercy is available to Good Samaritans who find themselves involved in drug trafficking cases. The court's ruling that the mandatory death penalty is constitutional was applied by the Federal Court of Malaysia in Public Prosecutor v. Lau Kee Hoo (1982).

Countries in the world that impose the death penalty (click on the image for a larger version)

However, in the subsequent case Reyes v. The Queen (2002), the Privy Council found Ong Ah Chuan of limited assistance as it felt that at the time it was decided the jurisprudence on international human rights was "rudimentary". The appellant in Reyes, who had been convicted of a double murder, appealed as to the constitutionality of the mandatory death sentence imposed on him. The Privy Council held that this penalty contravened the prohibition against inhuman or degrading punishment or treatment in section 7 of the Constitution of Belize. While recognising that the Constitution provides for the prerogative of mercy by vesting power to alter punishments in the Governor-General acting on the advice of an Advisory Council. However, this power was executive and not judicial in nature, and its existence could not remedy the constitutional defect in the sentencing process. The Privy Council reached a similar conclusion in R. v. Hughes (2002) and Fox v. The Queen (2002). In Watson v. The Queen (2004), the court stated that "[i]t is no longer acceptable, nor is it any longer possible to say, as Lord Diplock did on behalf of the Board in Ong Ah Chuan v Public Prosecutor [1981] AC 648, 674, that there is nothing unusual in a death sentence being mandatory. ... [T]he mandatory penalty of death on conviction of murder long predated any international arrangements for the protection of human rights."

K.S. Rajah has noted that Singapore, having been a United Nations member state since 21 September 1965, is deemed to have accepted the obligations in the United Nations Charter, which entails acceptance of the Universal Declaration of Human Rights. Article 5 of the Universal Declaration states: "No one shall be subjected to torture or to cruel, inhuman or degrading treatment or punishment." Furthermore, the European Convention on Human Rights applied to Singapore from October 1953 when it entered into force until 1963 when Singapore ceased to be part of the British Empire by becoming a state of Malaysia. Article 3 of the Convention prohibits torture and inhuman or degrading treatment or punishment. He said:

The provisions of the Articles [of the European Convention] must in some measure be regarded as incorporated into Part IV of the Constitution. It could not have been the intention of the framers of our Constitution to diminish the rights which Singaporeans as colonial subjects were entitled to enjoy, and to lose it on becoming independent citizens of a Republic with censorial power in their hands after freedom has taken effect.

Rajah proposed that, in the light of the Reyes, Hughes and Fox cases, the holding in Ong Ah Chuan that the mandatory death penalty is constitutional should no longer be relied on by the Singapore courts. Thus, provisions such as section 302 of the Penal Code, which imposes the penalty for the offence of murder, should be construed such that the death penalty is not mandatory in order to bring it into conformity with the Constitution pursuant to Article 162.

However, in Yong Vui Kong v. Public Prosecutor (2010), the Court of Appeal distinguished Privy Council cases such as Reyes, Hughes, Fox and Watson on the ground that were decided in different textual contexts, as inhuman punishment was expressly prohibited by the constitutions of the respective jurisdictions from which the cases originated. Hence, those cases were strictly based on the issue of what kind of punishment would be considered inhuman and not directly related to the issue on appeal in Yong Vui Kong, which was the meaning of the word law in Article 9(1) of the Constitution.

=== Article 12(1) ===
==== Regarding the reasonable relation test ====
===== Application =====
Several local and foreign cases have adopted the Privy Council's approach in Ong Ah Chuan to interpreting Article 12(1) of the Constitution. In Nguyen Tuong Van v. Public Prosecutor (2005), the Court of Appeal reiterated Lord Diplock's statements and applied the reasonable relation test. Similarly, in Kok Hoong Tan Dennis v. Public Prosecutor (1996) Johari bin Kanadi v. Public Prosecutor (2008), Yong Vui Kong, and Mohammad Faizal bin Sabtu v. Public Prosecutor (2012), the courts reaffirmed the position in Ong Ah Chuan that the differentia used to define a class of persons in a statute has to bear a reasonable relation to the social object of the statute.

Ong Ah Chuan was found not to be applicable by the Court of Appeal in Ramalingam Ravinthran v. Attorney-General (2012). The case involved a constitutional challenge by the appellant against the Public Prosecutor for charging him with a capital offence when another accused person involved in the same drug trafficking incident was not. While the Court said that the Public Prosecutor was required to compare like with like when deciding what charge to levy on accused persons, the present case differed from the factual situation in Ong Ah Chuan. In that case, the Privy Council was examining the constitutionality of a criminal offence, and held that an offence does not violate Article 12(1) so long as provides "equal punitive treatment for similar legal guilt". It is not necessary for an offence to distinguish between degrees of moral blameworthiness. On the other hand, the present case concerned the constitutionality of prosecutorial discretion. When making a charging decision, the Public Prosecutor:

... is obliged to consider, in addition to the legal guilt of the offender, his moral blameworthiness, the gravity of the harm caused to the public welfare by his criminal activity, and a myriad of other factors, including whether there is sufficient evidence against a particular offender, whether the offender is willing to co-operate with the law enforcement authorities in providing intelligence, whether one offender is willing to testify against his cooffenders, and so on – up to and including the possibility of showing some degree of compassion in certain cases.

In the Malaysian case Datuk Yong Teck Lee v. Public Prosecutor (1992), the plaintiff claimed that section 27(8) of the Police Act 1967 violated Article 8(1) of the Constitution of Malaysia, which provides that all persons are equal before the law and are entitled to the equal protection of the law. It was argued that this provision was violated because parliamentarians who participated in illegal demonstrations were subject to a higher mandatory fine as compared to non-parliamentarians who had committed similar offences. The High Court of Malaya applied the doctrine of reasonable classification and identified a rational relation between the differentia and the object of the statute.

Similarly, in the Indian case D.C. Bhatia v. Union of India (1995), the appellant challenged the constitutional validity of an amendment to the Delhi Rent Control Act, 1958, that sought to limit the protection of rent-control legislation to areas where the monthly rent was less than 3,500 rupees. In evaluating the challenge, the Supreme Court of India applied Ong Ah Chuan and identified "a rational connection between the legislative classifications and the object of the law".

===== Refinement =====
The current test applied to Article 12(1) of the Constitution is a three-stage test that was reformulated by the Court of Appeal in Public Prosecutor v. Taw Cheng Kong (1998). In determining whether section 37 of the Prevention of Corruption Act is discriminatory against Singaporean citizens, the Court cited Ong Ah Chuan for the proposition that equality simply ensures like treatment for individuals in like situations, and not that all persons should be treated equally. On this basis, and drawing on cases from foreign jurisdictions, the court set out the three-stage test as follows:

- Stage 1 – whether the law differentiates by prescribing a different treatment for different classes of individuals.
- Stage 2 – whether the classification is founded on an intelligible differentia that distinguishes people that are grouped together from others which are left out from the group.
- Stage 3 – whether the classification bears a rational relation to the object sought to be achieved by the law in question.

The Court of Appeal held that a law that is over- or under-inclusive can still bear a rational relation to the object of the legislation. The Court was of the view that it is impractical to expect the enactment of a piece of legislation to be "seamless and perfect to cover every contingency".

The reasonable relation test has since been applied in cases decided following Taw Cheng Kong such as Nguyen Tuong Van. However, it has attracted academic criticism. Tan Yock Lin has commented that the Privy Council's approach in Ong Ah Chuan was a mere tautology as it provides a "glib answer" to any allegations of inequality. He argues that in determining a reasonable differentia, an ideal approach should extend beyond "mere demonstration of rationality".

Yap Po-Jen has argued that the test does not allow the court to take into consideration the "wisdom or propriety of the legislative policy". As long as the court can identify a rational nexus between a classification and the object of a statute, it will uphold the legislative policy even if it is "invidiously discriminatory, unreasonable, irrational or unjust".

===== Arbitrariness in relation to Article 12(1) =====
A legislative provision that does not employ a form of classification inconsistent with the Constitution may nevertheless be applied in a way that violates Article 12(1). The reasonable relation test has been developed and broadened to serve as a legal test for the constitutionality of such administrative decisions. This modified reasonable relation test considers the arbitrariness of the administrative decision. The notion of arbitrariness with regard to an equality clause was elucidated in the Indian case Maneka Gandhi v. Union of India (1978). Here, in reference to Article 14 of the Constitution of India (the equivalent of Article 12 of the Singapore Constitution), the Indian Supreme Court stated that along with the notion of reasonable classification, there must also be a consideration of arbitrariness in an equality clause. It highlighted:

Equality is a dynamic concept with many aspects and dimensions and it cannot be imprisoned within traditional and doctrinaire limits ... Article 14 strikes at arbitrariness in State action and ensures fairness and equality of treatment.

Tan Tek Seng v. Suruhanjaya Perkhidmatan Pendidikan (1996) applied the principle in Maneka Gandhi. In discussing Article 8(1) of the Constitution of Malaysia, the court held that failure to adopt such a principle would result in an "archaic and arcane approach" to the interpretation of Article 8(1).

Singapore courts have integrated the notion of arbitrariness into the reasonable relation test. In Chng Suan Tze v. Minister for Home Affairs (1988), the appellants contested the validity of sections 8 and 10 of the Internal Security Act ("ISA"), The judgment dealt with whether the exercise of discretionary powers by the Minister for Home Affairs under the ISA is objective or subjective, and thus whether it is subject to judicial review. The Court of Appeal held that sections 8 and 10 were not arbitrary as "they provide for the exercise of the power to detain only for specific purposes" and therefore "bore a reasonable relation to the object of the law". Further, the Court held that if the discretion is not subject to review by a court of law, the decision is also rendered arbitrary and contrary to Article 12(1).

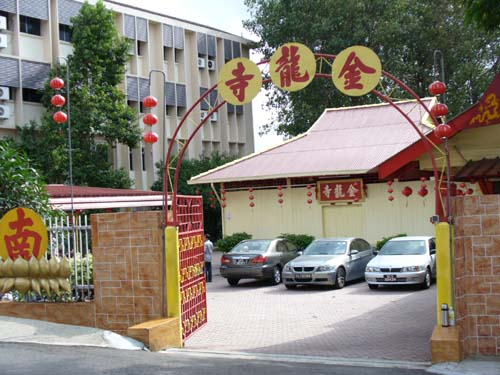
Jin Long Si Temple, the subject of the case Eng Foong Ho v. Attorney-General (2009)

In Eng Foong Ho v. Attorney-General (2009), the Court of Appeal was concerned with whether the decision by the Collector of Land Revenue to compulsorily acquire the piece of land on which the Jin Long Si Temple stood was contrary to Article 12(1) of the Constitution. Next to the temple was the Ramakrishna Mission and the Bartley Christian Church, but land belonging to these properties was not acquired. The appellants, who were the trustees of the temple land, argued, among other things, that the acquisition of that piece of land was against the equal protection clause as the State had discriminated against them in acquiring only their property and not the other two properties. The Court applied a modified reasonable relation test in determining the constitutionality of the land acquisition decision. It stated that to determine if it violated Article 12(1), "[t]he question is whether there is a reasonable nexus between the state action and the objective to be achieved by the law". The administration of a law "may be unconstitutional if it amounts to intentional and arbitrary discrimination". The mere existence of inequalities "due to inadvertence or inefficiency" is insufficient, unless it is on a "very substantial scale".

===== Alternatives to the Ong Ah Chuan approach =====
Approaches differing from the Ong Ah Chuan reasonable relation test have been applied to guarantees of equal protection in other jurisdictions. The Supreme Court of the United States has adopted a framework that serves as an alternative to the reasonable relation test adopted in Ong Ah Chuan. American jurisprudence on the Equal Protection Clause is based on a "suspect classification" model. Unlike the Ong Ah Chuan approach, this model encompasses three tiers of scrutiny. The level of scrutiny to be applied in each case is dependent upon the particular facts involved.

Level of scrutiny	Test	Application
Strict scrutiny	The measure must be narrowly tailored to a compelling state interest to withstand strict scrutiny.	Applied when the challenged law impinges on fundamental rights or involves a "suspect classification". Race, national origin and alienage are recognised as suspect.
Intermediate scrutiny	The challenged law must substantially advance an important state interest.	Applied when "quasi-suspect" classifications are involved, which are classifications based on gender or illegitimacy.
Rational basis review	The law must bear a rational relationship to a legitimate governmental purpose. The test requires only the existence of "any reasonably conceivable state of facts that could provide a rational basis for the classification" and the legislature is not required to supply reasons for enacting the law.	Applied when the law in question neither impinges a fundamental right nor involves a suspect or quasi-suspect classification.

It has been suggested that a proportionality analysis safeguards equality better than the American three-tiered scrutiny approach. The test of proportionality in English law, which is applied to determine whether a fundamental right is appropriately restricted by legislation, has three limbs:

1. The legislative objective must be sufficiently important to justify limiting the fundamental right.
2. The measures designed to meet the legislative objective must be rationally connected to it.
3. The means used to impair the right must be no more than is necessary to accomplish the objective.

== See also ==
- Article 9 of the Constitution of Singapore
- Article 12 of the Constitution of Singapore
- Capital punishment in Singapore
- Misuse of Drugs Act (Singapore)
