= Madhavan Nair v Public Prosecutor =

Madhavan Nair & Anor. v Public Prosecutor [1975] 2 MLJ 264 is a case in Malaysian law concerning the freedom of speech, sedition, and Article 10 of the Constitution.

== Background ==
The applicants had applied for and been granted a permit to speak in a public place under the terms of the Police Act, which grants the Royal Malaysian Police the power to issue such licences. The permit prohibited the applicants from speaking about particular issues, including the status of the Malay language as the national language, and policies related to education. These issues were considered "sensitive" — they had been entrenched in the Constitution after the May 13 Incident of racial rioting in the federal capital of Kuala Lumpur in 1969.

The applicants argued that these restrictions issued by the police were unconstitutional, contravening Article 10, which provides for freedom of speech (subject to any legislation that Parliament may pass restricting this freedom). In their view, a person ought to be able to speak on any issue he likes — if in doing so, he runs the risk of violating the law (questioning the "sensitive" provisions of the Constitution constitutes a crime under the Sedition Act), so be it. They argued that the police did not have the right to impose prior restraint in the issuing of permits, and this was thus ultra vires (beyond the power granted by) Article 10.

== Judgement ==
Justice Chang Min Tat rejected the arguments of the applicants. In his judgement, Chang stated that clauses (2), (3) and (4) of Article 10 allowed Parliament to restrict the freedoms of Article 10, and thus there was no unconstitutional infringement of the applicants' rights. Chang also cited the judgement in the British case of R. v. Comptroller of Patents-ex parte Bayer Products Ltd. (1941), stating:

...if a regulation is expressed to have been made because it appeared to the authorities to be necessary to secure, among other things, the public safety, the defence of the realm and the maintenance of public order then the court had no jurisdiction to investigate the reasons which impelled the authorities in question to the conclusion that it was necessary or expedient to effect any of the specified purposes.

== Criticism ==
The judgement has been criticised by legal scholars as "simplistic" in its reasoning, and for the judge's refusal to follow the "spirit of the constitution in assessing a reasonable balance between the right of a citizen to speak and the dictates of security or public order". It has been suggested that the court could have chosen to assess the "intent on the part of the applicant to create a seditious tendency in order to establish his state of mind". However, the Sedition Act expressly states that the intent of the person charged with sedition is irrelevant, so this may have been a route not open to the court.
