= Chen Jieyi =

Chen Jieyi may refer to:

- Kit Chan (Chinese: 陈洁仪; pinyin: Chén Jiéyí)
- Alvin Tan (blogger) (Chinese: 陈杰毅; pinyin: Chén Jiéyì)
