= Printing Presses and Publications Act 1984 =

Malaysian statute

- 9ء1

Parliament of Malaysia
- Long title: An Act to regulate the use of printing presses and the printing, importation, production, reproduction, publishing and distribution of publications and for matters connected therewith.
- Citation: Act 301
- Territorial extent: Malaysia
- Passed by: Dewan Rakyat
- Passed: 28 March 1984
- Passed by: Dewan Negara
- Passed: 16 April 1984
- Royal assent: 27 June 1984
- Commenced: 28 June 1984
- Effective: 1 September 1984, P.U. (B) 364/1984

Legislative history

Initiating chamber: Dewan Rakyat
- Bill title: Printing Presses and Publications Bill 1984
- Bill citation: D.R. 15/1984
- Introduced by: Mohd. Kassim Ahmed, Deputy Minister of Home Affairs
- First reading: 16 March 1984
- Second reading: 28 March 1984
- Third reading: 28 March 1984

Revising chamber: Dewan Negara
- Bill title: Printing Presses and Publications Bill 1984
- Bill citation: D.R. 15/1984
- Member(s) in charge: Mohd. Kassim Ahmed, Deputy Minister of Home Affairs
- First reading: 9 April 1984
- Second reading: 13 April 1984
- Third reading: 16 April 1984

Amended by
- Printing Presses and Publications (Amendment) Act 1987 [Act A684] Printing Presses and Publications (Amendment) Act 2012 [Act A1436]

Related legislation
- Printing Presses Act 1948 [Act 58] Control of Imported Publications Act 1958 [Act 63]

Keywords
- Printing press, publications
- Status: In force

The Printing Presses and Publications Act 1984 (Malay: Akta Mesin Cetak dan Penerbitan 1984) is a Malaysian statute governing the usage of printing presses and the printing, importation, production, reproduction, publishing and distribution of publications in Malaysia. It replaced the Printing Presses Act 1948 and the Control of Imported Publications Act 1958 (Revised 1972). A controversial amendment was made after Operation Lalang, where all printing presses were required to renew their licence annually through the Ministry of Home Affairs, seen as a move to curtail press freedom.The Act was subsequently amended in 2012 to remove the requirement for annual licence application and the government's 'absolute discretion' over permits, and reinstated judicial overview.

== Structure ==
The Printing Presses and Publications Act 1984, in its current form (1 September 2012), consists of 5 Parts containing 27 sections and 2 schedules (including 2 amendments).

- Part I: Preliminary
- Part II: Licensing of Printing Presses
- Part III: Permit to Publish Newspaper
- Part IV: Control of Undesirable Publications
- Part V: Miscellaneous
- Schedules

== Printing presses ==
The Act provides that it is a criminal offense to possess or use a printing press without a licence granted by the Home Affairs Minister. The Minister is given "absolute discretion" in the granting and revocation of licences, and can also restrict or ban outright publications that is likely to endanger national security interest or create social unrest. Should one possess or use an unlicensed printing press, he may be imprisoned for up to three years and/or fined up to RM20,000. A deposit made under Section 10 of the Act will also be forfeited in such a case.

== Publishing ==
The Home Affairs Minister is given "absolute discretion" to grant, revoke or suspend permits "to any person to print and publish a newspaper in Malaysia" or "to any proprietor of any newspaper in Singapore allowing such newspaper to be imported, sold, circulated or distributed in Malaysia." Permits are normally granted for the period of one year, and cannot be transferred without the permission of the Minister. Should one print, import, publish, sell, circulate or distribute — or even offer to do any of those things — a newspaper without a permit from the Minister, it will be deemed an offense punishable by up to three years in jail and/or a fine of up to RM20,000.

== Criticism ==
There has been quite a debate on the Printing Presses and Publications Act 1984 in Malaysia. Although the law was meant to maintain genuine news stories, create a regulated press sector, and provide legal guidelines to reporters, some say that the legislation is restricting political discourse, silencing political opponents and manipulating the news delivered to consumers.

The Act has been criticised for curtailing the freedom of speech in Malaysia, which is subject to any restriction Parliament may impose under Article 10 of the Constitution. In particular, it has been alleged that the Act "empowers the Minister to exercise virtually total control over the print media." This criticism was intensified after a 1987 amendment to the Act established an ouster clause preventing actions of the Home Affairs Minister from being called into question by the courts.

Despite this, High Court Justice Harun Hashim has asserted that the Home Affairs Minister's actions may be subjected to judicial review. In the case of Persatuan Aliran Kesedaran Negara v. Minister of Home Affairs, Harun quashed the decision of the Minister to refuse Aliran, a reform group, permission to publish a Malay publication. His decision was reversed on appeal in the Supreme Court, where Supreme Court Justice Ajaib Singh ruled that the amended section 12 of the Act did exclude actions of the Home Affairs Minister from judicial review.

The constitutionality of the Act has been called into question. In Public Prosecutor v. Pung Chen Choon, it was argued that the restrictions placed by section 8(A)(1) of the Act on freedom of speech violated Article 10 of the Constitution. The Supreme Court held that although the Act did restrict freedom of speech, such restrictions were permitted by Articles 4(2) and 10(2) of the Constitution, and that the right to freedom of speech was not an absolute right. While the Constitution of Malaysia does allow freedom of speech and for the press, there is a very crucial limitation - The Constitution provides that freedom of speech may be restricted by legislation "in the interest of security (or) public order.

Hence this means the government can enact legislation to determine the way information is disseminated by the mass media industry if the government feels that the national interest has been threatened. Supreme Court Justice Edgar Joseph stated:

The Government of this country has always recognised the important influence which the press exerts on the public mind, especially in the area of politics, and understandably, therefore, it has enacted laws which have imposed wide control over publications generally.

Although Pung's counsel presented various authorities from other jurisdictions, the Supreme Court dismissed them, holding that "the Malaysian press is not as free as the press in India, England or the United States of America and cases from these jurisdictions are of little relevance."

== Electronic media ==
As blogs and other online resources became more popular among Malaysians, the government is looking at expanding the act to include electronic media and Internet media. However, the statement was retracted several days later, as electronic media are considered to be under the Multimedia Commission. However, the act itself might be updated as studies on its relevance would be carried out.

== Notes and references ==
- [http://www.hrw.org/campaigns/malaysia/2000/laws-pppa.htm]
- https://web.archive.org/web/20080106105553/http://www.cijmalaysia.org/Bluffer_PPPA.htm
- https://web.archive.org/web/20110724150414/http://pcmlp.socleg.ox.ac.uk/archive/transition/issue07/malaysia.htm
- https://web.archive.org/web/20101229231014/http://www.thestar.com.my/news/story.asp?file=%2F2006%2F7%2F27%2Fnation%2F14961817&sec=nation
- https://web.archive.org/web/20070929091421/http://www.bernama.com.my/bernama/v3/news.php?id=211180
- http://www.sun2surf.com/article.cfm?id=14952
