= Freedom of assembly =

Right to form social or political groups and hold meetings

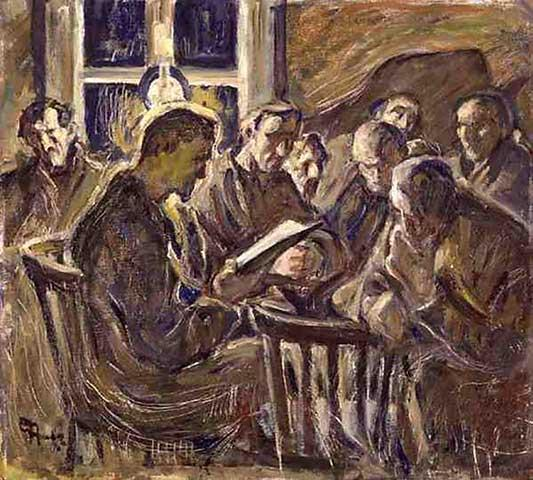
"Sammankomsten" ("The Meeting"), oil painting by Ester Almqvist, original at the Swedish National Museum. The painting was chosen by the UN as a motif for a stamp commemorating the establishment of the Universal Declaration of Human Rights, paragraph 20: the Right of Assembly.

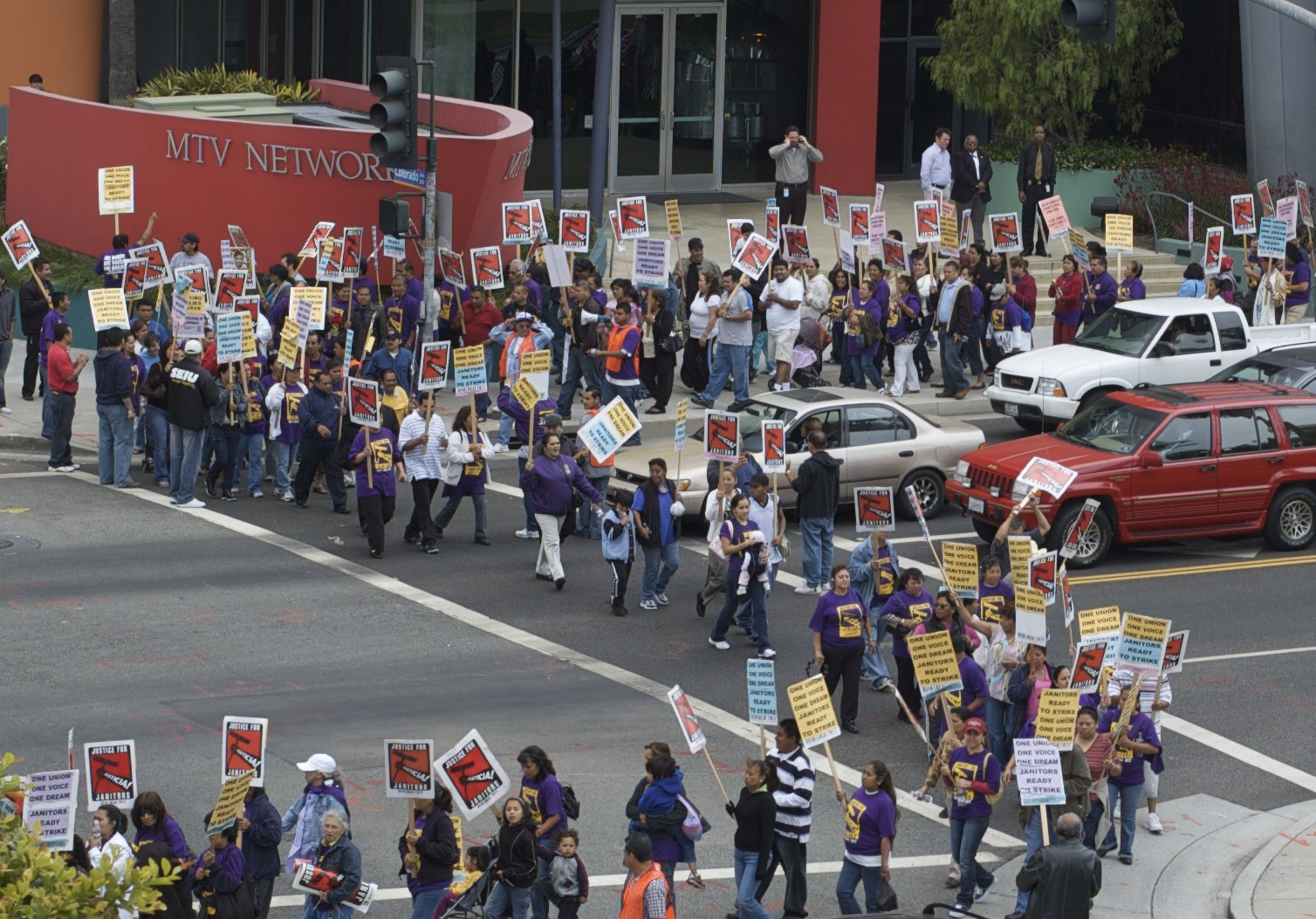
Janitorial workers striking in front of the MTV building in Santa Monica, California. Although striking in a trade union is a way of exercising freedom of assembly and freedom of association, other aspects of the conduct of the workers depicted here, such as pedestrian blocking of vehicle traffic in whichever direction has the right of way at this signal-controlled intersection, may violate local or state laws such as California Vehicle Code § 21950(b).

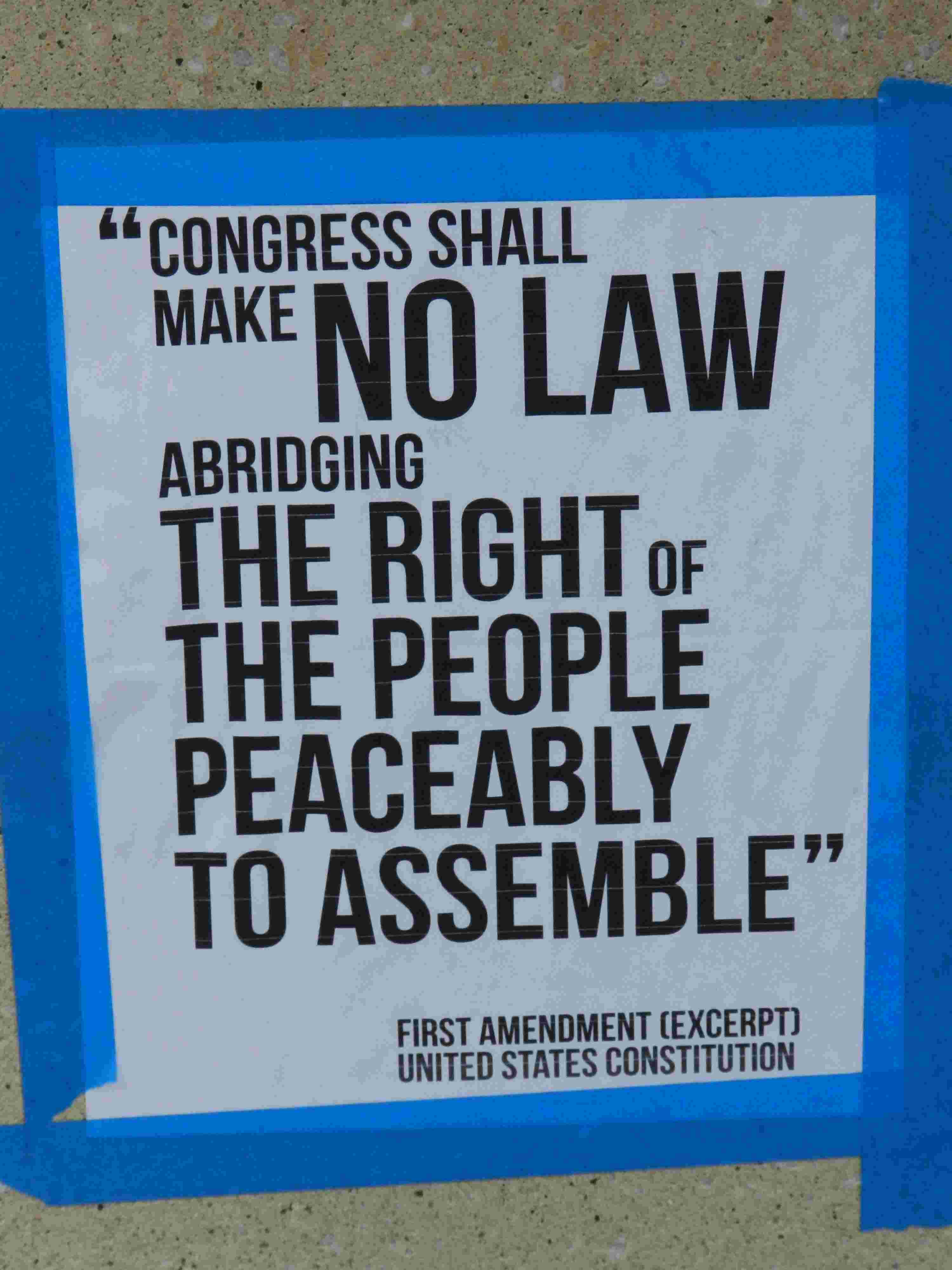
Posted excerpt from the US Constitution, at an Occupy Oakland event, 2011

Freedom of assembly, sometimes used interchangeably with the freedom of association, is the individual right or ability of individuals to peaceably assemble and collectively express, promote, pursue, and defend their ideas. The right to freedom of assembly is recognized as a human right, a political right and a civil liberty.

The terms freedom of assembly and freedom of association may be used to distinguish between the freedom to assemble in public places and the freedom to join an association. Freedom of assembly is often used in the context of the right to protest, while freedom of association is used in the context of labor rights. The Constitution of the United States is interpreted to mean both the freedom to assemble and the freedom to join an association.

== Human rights instruments ==
Freedom of assembly is included in, among others, the following human rights instruments:

- Universal Declaration of Human Rights – Article 20
- International Covenant on Civil and Political Rights – Article 21
- European Convention on Human Rights – Article 11
- American Convention on Human Rights – Article 15

National and regional constitutions that recognize freedom of assembly include:

- Bangladesh – Articles 37 and 38 of the Constitution of Bangladesh guarantee the freedom of association and assembly.
- Brazil – Article 5 of the Constitution of Brazil
- Canada – S. 2 of the Canadian Charter of Rights and Freedoms which forms part of the Constitution Act, 1982
- France – Article 431-1 of the Nouveau Code Pénal
- Germany – Article 8 GG (Grundgesetz, Basic Law)
- Hungary – Article VIII (1) of the Fundamental Law
- India – Article 19 of the Constitution of India
- Indonesia – Article 28E(3) of the Constitution of Indonesia
- Ireland – Article 40.6.1° of the Constitution, as enumerated under the heading "Fundamental Rights"
- Italy – Article 17 of the Constitution
- Japan – Article 21 of the Constitution of Japan
- Macau Basic Law - Article 27
- Malaysia – Article 10 of the Constitution of Malaysia
- Mexico – Article 9 of the Constitution of Mexico
- Netherlands - Articles 8 and 9 of the Constitution of the Kingdom of the Netherlands
- New Zealand – Section 16 New Zealand Bill of Rights Act 1990
- Norway – Section 101 of the Constitution of Norway
- Pakistan - Article 16 of the Constitution of Pakistan, 1973
- Philippines – Article III, Section 4 of the Constitution of the Philippines
- Poland – Article 57 of the Constitution of Poland
- Russia – Articles 30 and 31 of the Constitution of Russia guarantee the freedom of association and peaceful assembly.
- South Africa Bill of Rights – Article 17
- Spain – Article 21 of the Spanish Constitution of 1978
- Sweden – Chapter 2 of The Instrument of Government
- Taiwan (Republic of China) – Article 14 guarantees freedom of assembly and association.
- Turkey – Articles 33 and 34 of the Constitution of Turkey guarantee the freedom of association and assembly.
- UAE – Article 33 of the Constitution of the UAE
- United States – First Amendment to the Constitution of the United States
- Venezuela – Article 68 of the Constitution of Venezuela

== See also ==
- Free speech zone
- Right to protest
- Strategy-31
- Unlawful assembly
- United Nations Special Rapporteur on the Rights to Freedom of Peaceful Assembly and of Association
