= Alvin Tan (blogger) =

Malaysian blogger

- Born: 陈杰毅; 20 December 1988 (age 37); Kuala Lumpur, Malaysia
- Citizenship: Malaysia (until 2025); United States (since 2025)
- Occupations: Blogger, pornographic film actor

Alvin Tan Jye Yee (Chinese: 陳杰毅; Pe̍h-ōe-jī: Tân Kia̍t-gē; born 20 December 1988) is an American pornographic film performer. Born in Malaysia, he first gained prominence for a blog publicising his sexual activities with his girlfriend, and later became controversial for his criticism of Islam, leading him to flee Malaysia and seek political asylum in the United States. He calls himself a "free speech activist".

== Early life and education ==
Tan was born in Kuala Lumpur, Malaysia. Of Malaysian Chinese descent, was studying law overseas at the National University of Singapore (NUS) in Singapore. He uploaded videos to his public blog of himself having sex with his ex-girlfriend Vivian Lee, while inviting others to join in. The opposition to these videos led to Tan being stripped of his ASEAN scholarship for the university, and he returned to Malaysia. Pressured by their families, the couple shut down their blog.

He is a critic of Islam, comparing it to Nazism, and has called for a "separation of mosque and state". Tan and his girlfriend posed for a photograph while eating pork and uploaded it to Facebook as a Ramadan greeting, which led to them being put on trial for sedition. They pleaded not guilty, but were jailed without bail until the conclusion of the trial.

While Lee remained in Malaysia to face trial, Tan left Malaysia for California, U.S., and continues to post content critical of Islam, including a video of him reciting the Muslim call to prayer bare-chested. In November 2015, Tan again caused controversy when he uploaded onto Facebook a comic strip of photographs of himself defecating, and then wiping his anus with a page from the Quran, the Islamic holy book. He took a picture of his faeces in that comic strip. He stated in his comments on the post that any abuse he received for the act would only bolster his opinion that Islam is violent.

== Criticism ==
During Tan and Lee's trial, Malaysian prime minister Najib Razak said that "The insolent and impudent act by the young couple who insulted Islam showed that freedom of expression and irresponsible opinion can jeopardise the community".

Tan has a following of 85,000 on Facebook as of November 2015, including some Muslims. However, he has also been criticised for bringing bad publicity to other members of the nation's ethnic Chinese community. During his trial, Malaysia's Attorney General Abdul Gani Patail said that Tan's Ramadan photograph was likely to be the motive to a religiously aggravated assault on a Chinese man.

== Personal life ==
In 2025, Tan obtained American citizenship and renounced his Malaysian citizenship, as Malaysia does not recognize dual nationality.

== See also ==
- Sedition Act (Malaysia)
