= Sedition Act 1948 =

Law of Malaysia

Federal Legislative Council
- Long title: An Act to provide for the punishment of sedition.
- Citation: Act 15
- Territorial extent: Malaysia
- Passed: 6 July 1948
- Royal assent: 15 July 1948
- Effective: Peninsular Malaysia–19 July 1948, Ord. No. 14 of 1948; Sabah–28 May 1964, L.N. 149/1964; Sarawak–20 November 1969, P.U. (A) 476/1969; Revised as Act 15 in 1969 (w.e.f 14 April 1970)

Repeals
- The Sedition Enactment 1939 [F.M.S. En. 13/1939]; The Sedition Ordinance 1938 [S.S. Ord. 18/1938]; The Sedition Enactment 1939 [Johore En. 2/1939]; The Sedition Enactment [Kedah En. 25/1357]; The Sedition Enactment 1358 [Perlis En. 1/1358]; The Sedition Enactment 1940 [Kelantan En. 7/1940]; The Sedition Enactment [Trengganu En. 9/1358]

Amended by
- Federal Constitution (Modification of Laws) (Ordinances and Proclamations) Order 1958 [L.N. 332/1958]; Modification of Laws (Sedition) (Extension and Modification) Order 1964 [L.N. 149/1964]; Modification of Laws (Sedition) (Extension and Modification) Order 1969 [P.U. (A) 476/1969]; Emergency (Essential Powers) Ordinance No. 45, 1970 [P.U. (A) 282/1970]; Malaysian Currency (Ringgit) Act 1975 [Act 160]; Sedition (Amendment) Act 2015 [Act A1485]

Related legislation
- Sedition Act (Singapore)

Keywords
- freedom of speech, Lèse-majesté, sedition
- Status: In force

The Sedition Act 1948 (Malay: Akta Hasutan 1948) in Malaysia is a law prohibiting discourse deemed as seditious. The act was originally enacted by the colonial authorities of British Malaya in 1948 to contain the local communist insurgence. The act criminalises speech with "seditious tendency", including that which would "bring into hatred or contempt or to excite disaffection against" the government or engender "feelings of ill-will and hostility between different races". The meaning of "seditious tendency" is defined in section 3 of the Sedition Act 1948 and in substance it is similar to the English common law definition of sedition, with modifications to suit local circumstances. The Malaysian definition includes the questioning of certain portions of the Constitution of Malaysia, namely those pertaining to the Malaysian social contract, such as Article 153, which deals with special rights for the bumiputra (Malays and other indigenous peoples, who comprise over half the Malaysian population).

== Structure ==
The Sedition Act 1948, in its current form (4 June 2015), consists of 11 sections and no schedule (including 6 amendments), without separate Part.

- Section 1: Short title
- Section 2: Interpretation
- Section 3: Seditious tendency
- Section 4: Offences
- Section 5: Legal proceedings
- Section 5A: Power of court to prevent person from leaving Malaysia
- Section 6: Evidence
- Section 6A: Non-application of sections 173A, 293 and 294 of the Criminal Procedure Code
- Section 7: Innocent receiver of seditious publication
- Section 8: Issue of search warrant
- Section 9: Suspension of newspaper containing seditious matter
- Section 10: Power of court to prohibit circulation of seditious publications
- Section 10A: Special power to issue order regarding seditious publications by electronic means
- Section 11: Arrest without warrant

== History ==
The law was introduced by the British in 1948, the same year that the autonomous Federation of Malaya came into being, with the intent of curbing opposition to colonial rule. The law remained on the statute books through independence in 1957, and the merger with Sabah, Sarawak and Singapore that formed Malaysia.

The Federal Constitution of Malaya and later Malaysia permitted Parliament to impose restrictions on the freedom of speech granted by the Constitution. After the May 13 Incident, when racial riots in the capital of Kuala Lumpur led to at least 200 deaths, the government amended the Constitution to expand the scope of limitations on freedom of speech. The Constitution (Amendment) Act 1971 named Articles 152, 153, and 181, and also Part III of the Constitution as specially protected, permitting Parliament to pass legislation that would limit dissent with regard to these provisions pertaining to the social contract. (The social contract is essentially a quid pro quo agreement between the Malay and non-Malay citizens of Peninsular Malaysia; in return for granting the non-Malays citizenship at independence, symbols of Malay authority such as the Malay monarchy became national symbols, and the Malays were granted special economic privileges.) With this new power, Parliament then amended the Sedition Act accordingly. The new restrictions also applied to Members of Parliament, overruling Parliamentary immunity; at the same time, Article 159, which governs Constitutional amendments, was amended to entrench the "sensitive" Constitutional provisions; in addition to the consent of Parliament, any changes to the "sensitive" portions of the Constitution would now have to pass the Conference of Rulers, a body comprising the monarchs of the Malay states.

These later amendments were harshly criticised by the opposition parties in Parliament, who had campaigned for greater political equality for non-Malays in the 1969 general election. Despite their opposition, the ruling Alliance (later Barisan Nasional) coalition government passed the amendments, having maintained the necessary two-thirds Parliamentary majority. In Britain, the laws were condemned, with The Times of London stating they would "preserve as immutable the feudal system dominating Malay society" by "giving this archaic body of petty constitutional monarchs incredible blocking power"; the move was cast as hypocritical, given that Deputy Prime Minister Tun Abdul Razak had spoken of "the full realization that important matters must no longer be swept under the carpet..."

There have been several challenges to the constitutionality of the Sedition Act. In 2016, Malaysia's Court of Appeal ruled that the section of the Act which states that the intention of a person charged under the Act is "irrelevant" was unconstitutional.

== Provisions ==
The Sedition Act would be unconstitutional, as the Constitution guarantees freedom of speech, without Article 10(2) of the Constitution, which permits Parliament to enact "such restrictions as it deems necessary or expedient in the interest of the security of the Federation or any part thereof, friendly relations with other countries, public order or morality and restrictions designed to protect the privileges of Parliament or of any Legislative Assembly or to provide against contempt of court, defamation, or incitement to any offence". Article 10(4) also states that "Parliament may pass law prohibiting the questioning of any matter, right, status, position, privilege, sovereignty or prerogative established or protected by the provisions of Part III, article 152, 153 or 181 otherwise than in relation to the implementation thereof as may be specified in such law".

These portions of the Constitution have been criticised by human rights advocates, who charge that "under the Malaysian Constitution, the test is not whether or not the restriction is necessarily but the much lower standard of whether or not Parliament deems the restrictions necessary or even expedient. There is no objective requirement that the restriction actually is necessary or expedient and the latter standard is much lower than that of necessity."

Section 4 of the Sedition Act specifies that anyone who "does or attempts to do, or makes any preparation to do, or conspires with any person to do" an act with seditious tendency, such as uttering seditious words, or printing, publishing or importing seditious literature, is guilty of sedition. It is also a crime to possess a seditious publication without a "lawful excuse". The act defines sedition itself as anything which "when applied or used in respect of any act, speech, words, publication or other thing qualifies the act, speech, words, publication or other thing as having a seditious tendency".

Under section 3(1), those acts defined as having a seditious tendency are acts with a tendency:

(a) to bring into hatred or contempt or to excite disaffection against any Ruler or against any Government;

(b) to excite the subjects of the Ruler or the inhabitants of any territory governed by any government to attempt to procure in the territory of the Ruler or governed by the Government, the alteration, otherwise than by lawful means, of any matter as by law established;

(c) to bring into hatred or contempt or to excite disaffection against the administration of justice in Malaysia or in any State;

(d) to raise discontent or disaffection amongst the subjects of the Yang di-Pertuan Agong or of the Ruler of any State or amongst the inhabitants of Malaysia or of any State;

(e) to promote feelings of ill-will and hostility between different races or classes of the population of Malaysia; or

(f) to question any matter, right, status, position, privilege, sovereignty or prerogative established or protected by the provisions of part III of the Federal constitution or Article 152, 153 or 181 of the Federal Constitution.

Section 3(2) provides certain exceptions, providing examples of speech which cannot be deemed seditious. It is not seditious to "show that any Ruler has been misled or mistaken in any of his measures", nor is it seditious "to point out errors or defects in the Government or Constitution as by law established". It is also not seditious "to attempt to procure by lawful means the alteration of any matter in the territory of such Government as by law established" or "to point out, with a view to their removal, any matters producing or having a tendency to produce feelings of ill-will and enmity between different races or classes of the population of the Federation". However, the act explicitly states that any matter covered by subsection (1)(f), namely those matters pertaining to the Malaysian social contract, cannot have these exceptions applied to it.

Section 3(3) goes on to state that "the intention of the person charged at the time he did or attempted (a seditious act) ... shall be deemed to be irrelevant if in fact the act had, or would, if done, have had, or the words, publication or thing had a seditious tendency". This latter provision has been criticised for overruling mens rea, a legal principle stating that a person cannot be guilty of a crime if he did not have the intent to commit a crime.

A person found guilty of sedition may be sentenced to three years in jail, a RM5,000 fine, or both.

== Arrests and prosecutions under the Sedition Act ==
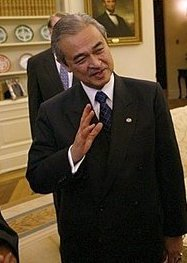
In 2003, then Deputy Prime Minister Abdullah Ahmad Badawi threatened to charge opponents of a change in educational policy with sedition.

In recent times, the law has been invoked to quell the political opposition. Famously in 2000, Marina Yusoff, a former vice president of the National Justice Party (Parti Keadilan Nasional) was charged with sedition for alleging that the United Malays National Organisation (UMNO), had provoked the massacres of the Chinese during the May 13 Incident. The editor for the opposition was also charged with sedition for alleging a government conspiracy against Anwar Ibrahim, a former Deputy Prime Minister, had led to his political downfall. Anwar's lead counsel, Karpal Singh, who was also deputy chairman of the opposition Democratic Action Party (DAP), had also been charged with sedition after claiming Anwar had been poisoned by "people in high places". Lim Guan Eng, a former Member of Parliament from the opposing party DAP, had also been found guilty of sedition in 1998 for accusing the Attorney General of failing to properly handle a case where the Chief Minister of Malacca had been charged with statutory rape of a schoolgirl.

In 2003, the act was also invoked by then Deputy Prime Minister Abdullah Ahmad Badawi (who succeeded Mahathir Mohamad as Prime Minister of Malaysia later that year); Abdullah stated that the government would charge people with sedition if they opposed the change in educational policy that puts more emphasis on the teaching of science and mathematics in English. That same year, the online publication Malaysiakini was temporarily shut down under the Sedition Act after it published a letter criticising Malay special rights and compared the Youth wing of a government party to the Ku Klux Klan. Previously in 1978, the Sedition Act had been invoked in another case of educational policy, when Mark Koding argued in Parliament that the government ought to close down Chinese and Tamil vernacular schools.

In 2006, the DAP, which had been a vocal opponent of the Sedition Act and the Internal Security Act (ISA), filed a police report against UMNO, whose annual general assembly had been noted for its heated rhetoric, with delegates making statements such as "Umno is willing to risk lives and bathe in blood to defend the race and religion. Don't play with fire. If they (non-Malays) messed with our rights, we will mess with theirs." In response, Information Minister Zainuddin Maidin said that this indicated that the Sedition Act continued to remain relevant to Malaysian society. He also denied that the government intentionally used the act to silence dissent or to advance particular political interests.

In August 2014, a Penang teenager who allegedly liked an "I love Israel" Facebook page was investigated under the Sedition Act by the South Seberang Perai police. He had sought police support after being threatened with immolation for liking the page, which he said happened by accident.

In November 2020, a student group at the University of Malaya called the Association of New Youth (UMANY) was investigated under the Sedition Act after posting an article on Facebook titled “Yang di-Pertuan Agong should not intervene in national affairs". Amnesty International Malaysia described the investigation as "appalling" and said it violated the students' freedom of expression.

In December 2023, during the Gaza war, Malaysian police announced they had arrested a man who made statements suggesting that Malaysia should establish diplomatic ties with Israel, and were investigating him under the Sedition Act.

== Sedition (Amendment) Act 2015 ==
Since 2011, former Primer Minister Najib Razak has made several promises to abolish the Sedition Act. However in 2015, he went back on his word and made amendments to the 1948 Act that strengthened it instead. For example, it included an online media ban and mandatory jail following the arrest of a Malaysian cartoonist over a series of tweets. Sharp criticism followed the passing of the law from the top United Nations human rights official Zeid Ra'ad Al Hussein.

The government has said that these amendments were made to prevent malicious individuals from using the Internet to cause racial disharmony and divisions in Malaysian society. Former Minister of Home Affairs, Zahid Hamidi, stated that the "unity of the country remains our topmost priority," and that the Act is not meant to suppress the freedom of speech, but to prevent people from making statements that would "destabilise the country".

Some key amendments to the Act include:

=== The definition of "seditious tendency" ===
It is still an offence to bring hatred, contempt or to excite disaffection against any Ruler or Government in Malaysia. The amendment has not been fully passed in the Parliament as of 5 October 2023.

=== Section 4 ===
After the word "publishes", the words "or caused to be publish" has now been added under Section 4. It also substituted the word "import" to "propagate" seditious publication under Section 4. The Act does not clearly define what "propagate" means. Some people, including an article published by The Star, have claimed that these amendments were made with current forms of dissent in mind, such as critical postings on social media. This is because individuals can now be charged with sedition for retweeting or reposting content, without being the original publisher of that content.

=== New section 5A ===
The new section 5A gives the court discretion "to prevent a person who is charged under section 4 who is released on bail from leaving Malaysia."

=== Section 10 ===
The amended section 10 empowers the court to make a prohibition order to prohibit the making or circulation of any seditious publication if the continued circulation of the publication would likely lead to "bodily injury or damage to property" or "feelings of ill will, hostility or hatred" between the "different races or classes" of Malaysia or between persons on "the grounds of religion".

The new Section 10(1A)(b) allows the court to make a prohibition order to "remove any Seditious publications which is made by electronic means such as online publication" and prohibits the person circulating the prohibited publication from using any electronic devices.

The new section 10A also gives the courts special powers to issue orders involving prohibited publication through electronic means. If the publication is considered to be seditious, "the Sessions Court Judge shall make an order directing an officer authorized under the Communications and Multimedia Act 1998 [Act 588] to prevent access to such publication.” Zahid Hamidi stated that these amendments were made because the changing political landscape where people can easily spread seditious remarks through the Internet - "Last time, there was no Internet and non-verbal communication over social media. Those days, we didn't have groups of people inciting people (in Sabah and Sarawak) to get out of Malaysia.

== Criticisms of the Act ==
Human rights advocates such from organizations such as Amnesty International and Article 19 have made consistent claims that the Sedition Act is an attack on the freedom of speech in Malaysia. Critics argue that the definition of sedition in the Act is vague or overly "broad and inflexible", which could "potentially lead to an "overreach" or an "abusive application of the law". In November 2020, Amnesty International Malaysia launched a virtual campaign called "Unsilenced" to urge the Malaysian government to repeal and amend the laws that suppress the freedom of speech in Malaysia. The Sedition Act is one of these laws, other laws include the Communications and Multimedia Act and the Film Censorship Act.

== See also ==
- Internal Security Act (Malaysia)
- May 13 Incident
- Sedition Act (Singapore)
- 2014 Malaysian sedition dragnet
- Alvin Tan (blogger), Malaysian Chinese blogger and critic of Islam prosecuted under the act
