= Article 10 of the Constitution of Malaysia =

Parliament of Malaysia
- Long title: Article guaranteeing freedom of speech, assembly, and association with restrictions.
- Citation: Constitution of Malaysia, Article 10
- Territorial extent: Malaysia
- Enacted by: Reid Commission (drafting body)
- Enacted: 27 August 1957
- Commenced: 31 August 1957

Related legislation
- Article 4, Article 149, Article 150
- Status: In force

Article 10 of the Constitution of Malaysia guarantees Malaysian citizens the right to freedom of speech, freedom of assembly and freedom of association. Unlike comparable provisions in constitutional law such as the First Amendment to the United States Constitution, Article 10 entitles citizens to such freedoms as are not restricted by the government, instead of absolutely guaranteeing those freedoms.

== Article 10 ==
1. Subject to Clauses (2), (3) and (4) —
  - (a) every citizen has the right to freedom of speech and expression;
  - (b) all citizens have the right to assemble peaceably and without arms;
  - (c) all citizens have the right to form associations.
2. Parliament may by law impose —
  - (a) on the rights conferred by paragraph (a) of Clause (1), such restrictions as it deems necessary or expedient in the interest of the security of the Federation or any part thereof, friendly relations with other countries, public order or morality and restrictions designed to protect the privileges of Parliament or of any Legislative Assembly or to provide against contempt of court, defamation, or incitement to any offence;
  - (b) on the right conferred by paragraph (b) of Clause (1), such restrictions as it deems necessary or expedient in the interest of the security of the Federation or any part thereof, or public order;
  - (c) on the right conferred by paragraph (c) of Clause (1), such restrictions as it deems necessary or expedient in the interest of the security of the Federation or any part thereof, public order or morality.
3. Restrictions on the right to form associations conferred by paragraph (c) of Clause (1) may also be imposed by any law relating to labour or education.
4. In imposing restrictions in the interest of the security of the Federation or any part thereof or public order under Clause (2) (a), Parliament may pass law prohibiting the questioning of any matter, right, status, position, privilege, sovereignty or prerogative established or protected by the provisions of Part III, Article 152, Article 153 or Article 181 otherwise than in relation to the implementation thereof as may be specified in such law.

== History ==
=== Drafting ===
The Constitution of the independent Federation of Malaya — which later merged with Singapore, Sabah and Sarawak to form Malaysia — was drafted by the Reid Commission, a body of eminent jurists from the Commonwealth of Nations. In its report, the Commission recommended that the Constitution protect "certain fundamental individual rights which are as essential conditions for a free and democratic way of life". Although the commissioners avoided recommending that these rights be entrenched — finding that they were "...all firmly established in Malaya" — they nevertheless felt that in light of "vague apprehensions about the future", it would be well to provide some constitutional safeguards for these rights. The "vague apprehensions" were mainly those of the non-Malays, who feared that an independent Malaya would be dominated politically by the Malays (see ketuanan Melayu). The Reid Commission thus recommended that the rights "...should be guaranteed in the Constitution and the courts should have the power of enforcing these rights".

The draft Constitution prepared by the Commission included an Article 10 largely similar to the one eventually included in the final Constitution. However, the draft first clause differed in one important respect:

Every citizen shall have the right to freedom of speech and expression, subject to any reasonable (emphasis added) restriction imposed by federal law in the interest of the security of the Federation, friendly relations with other countries, public order, or morality or in relation to contempt of court, defamation or incitement to any offence.

The other clauses covering freedom of assembly and association also similarly referred to a "reasonable restriction". Justice Abdul Hamid of Pakistan, a member of the Commission, wrote a strong dissenting view that was included in the final report of the Commission. His dissent criticised, among others, the draft versions of Article 4 and Article 10. Hamid objected to the inclusion of the word "reasonable", stating:

If the word reasonable is allowed to stand, every legislation on this subject will be challenged in court on the ground that the restrictions imposed by the legislature are not reasonable. This will in many cases give rise to conflict between the views of the legislature and the views of the court on the reasonableness of the restrictions. To avoid this situation it is better to make the legislature be the judge of the reasonableness of the restrictions... There will always be a fear that the court may hold the restrictions imposed by it to be unreasonable. The laws would be lacking in certainty.

=== Final version ===
The Working Committee established by the autonomous Federation's government adopted nearly all of Hamid's recommendations in his dissent, thereby eliminating the possibility of judicial review concerning the reasonableness of laws which infringed on the rights granted by Article 10. One legal commentator has stated:

It hardly needs to be said that without Justice Hamid's dissent on this point, the three freedoms under Article 10 would have been more satisfactorily guarded by the courts.

Lord William Reid, who chaired the Commission, said that:

...a greater part of the changes have been in the direction of giving more freedom to the executive and Parliament of Malaya and correspondingly less extensive guarantees of individual rights that we had recommended. I cannot speak for my colleagues but speaking for myself I am not dismayed at the changes which have been made.

During the debate over the draft Constitution in the Federal Legislative Council, K.L. Devaser, an Alliance government backbencher, criticised the changes, arguing:

...the draft Constitutional proposals take away the right of the court of law because the government can decide what is necessary and expedient, whereas the Reid Commission Report gives power to the court of law and the court of law can say that it is not in the interest of security of the Federation. As a lawyer I do feel that the right of the subject is much better safeguarded if the last say is in the court of law rather than in the hands of the executive authority...

Over his objections, the Legislative Council approved the modified draft. This version of the Constitution, which contained an Article 10 much more similar to the present day version, also included a new Article 4(2) which provides that "The validity of any law shall not be questioned on the ground that...it imposes such restrictions as are mentioned in Article 10(2)". In light of these changes, a Malaysian lawyer has argued that "It is clear ... that freedoms of ... speech, assembly and association (Article 10) were intended to be restricted Ab initio."

== Implementation ==
Several acts of law regulate the freedoms granted by Article 10, such as the Official Secrets Act, which makes it a crime to disseminate information classified as an official secret. The Sedition Act 1948 makes it an offence to engage in acts with a "seditious tendency", including but not limited to the spoken word and publications; conviction may result in a sentence of a fine up to RM5,000, three years in jail, or both. The Public Order (Preservation) Ordinance 1958 allows the Police to declare certain areas "restricted", and to regulate processions or meetings of five persons or more. The maximum sentence for the violation of a restricted area order is imprisonment of 10 years and whipping.

Other laws curtailing the freedoms of Article 10 are the Police Act 1967, which criminalises the gathering of three or more people in a public place without a licence, and the Printing Presses and Publications Act 1984, which grants the Home Affairs Minister "absolute discretion" in the granting and revoking of publishing permits, and also makes it a criminal offense to possess a printing press without a licence.

The Sedition Act in particular has been widely commented upon by jurists for the bounds it places on freedom of speech. Justice Raja Azlan Shah (later the Yang di-Pertuan Agong) once said:

The right to free speech ceases at the point where it comes within the mischief of the Sedition Act.

In 2009, the government announced it was considering amendment of several laws which impinge upon freedom of speech, including the controversial Internal Security Act (ISA), which has been used to detain numerous politicians and activists without trial. Home Minister Hishammuddin Hussein, accompanied by Inspector-General of Police Musa Hassan, Attorney General Abdul Gani Patail, Information, Communication, and Culture Minister Rais Yatim, and Minister in the Prime Minister's Department Nazri Aziz, told the press that the ISA, Police Act, Multimedia and Communications Act, the Restrictive Residence Ordinance, and the Emergency Ordinance would be reviewed with an eye to relaxing restrictions on freedom of speech. Rais also said that the Police Act would include provisions allowing peaceful assembly in certain designated places such as stadiums, without the need to obtain a permit from the police. The government plans to table amendments to these laws during the October sitting of Parliament, and pass them by December.

== Legal criticism ==
Legal scholars have suggested that compared to other fundamental liberties set out in Part II of the Constitution, the freedoms of speech, association and assembly are easily abridged by both the executive and legislative branches of the government. Most of these freedoms, such as freedom from slavery, double jeopardy, etc., are not subjected to the same exclusions as set out in Article 10(2), (3) and (4). Instead, they are rights which are guaranteed without any qualification. The rights of Article 10 are subject to the exclusions of the aforementioned clauses. Under Articles 149 and 150, during a state of emergency, the executive is granted the power to legislate, even if the resulting laws contravene the Constitution; however, this power does not extend to any matter pertaining to Islamic law, Malay customs, the customs of the indigenous peoples of Sabah and Sarawak, religion in general, citizenship, and language. In light of this, one scholar (Shad Saleem Faruqi) has gone as far as to argue that:

...the only genuinely safeguarded provisions of the Constitution are not those contained in Part II but those given under Article 150(6A). They enjoy greater sanctity and are more entrenched in the Constitution than any other rights.

It has been remarked that although the "fundamental" rights of Article 10 were not entrenched, other portions of the Constitution — namely those related to the Malaysian social contract such as those provisions concerning the national language of Malay, the national religion of Islam, the position of the Malay rulers, the special position of the Malay majority, and citizenship — were entrenched. These provisions may only be amended with the consent of the Conference of Rulers — a body comprising the Malay rulers and the Governors of those states without a monarch. In criticising the Reid Commission's finding that the freedoms of Article 10 were "all firmly established in Malaya" prior to independence, it has been suggested that:

...these basic rights had not been clearly formulated or seen as being concrete and traditional. In contrast, what were really regarded as 'traditional elements' of the Constitution were matters of citizenship (Part III), the special position of the Malays (Article 153), the national (Malay) language (Article 152), and the sovereign rights of the Rulers (Article 181).

== See also ==
- Madhavan Nair v Public Prosecutor
- Sedition Act (Malaysia)
